= List of barrios and sectors of Patillas, Puerto Rico =

Like all municipalities of Puerto Rico, Patillas is subdivided into administrative units called barrios, which are, in contemporary times, roughly comparable to minor civil divisions. The barrios and subbarrios, in turn, are further subdivided into smaller local populated place areas/units called sectores (sectors in English). The types of sectores may vary, from normally sector to urbanización to reparto to barriada to residencial, among others. Some sectors appear in two barrios.

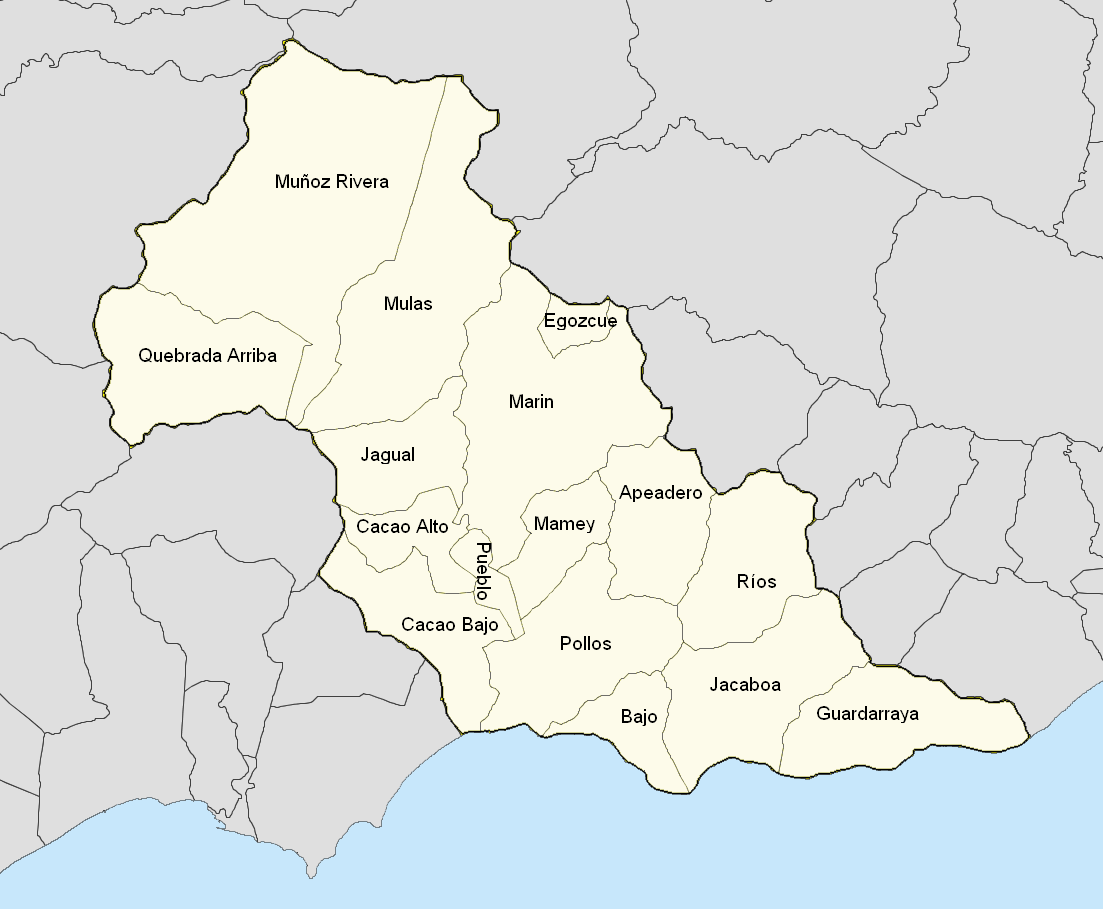
Patillas map

== List of sectors by barrio ==
=== Apeadero ===
- Carretera 757
- Sector Acueducto
- Sector Amill
- Sector Campos
- Sector Carrión
- Sector Estrada
- Sector Justo Rosa
- Sector La Loma Final
- Sector Los Morales
- Sector Machuchal
- Sector Russi

=== Bajo ===
- Calle El Fuego
- Carretera 3
- Sector Barro Blanco
- Sector Villa Marina
- Sector Villa Pesquera
- Urbanización Solimar

=== Cacao Alto ===
There are no sectors in Cacao Alto barrio.

=== Cacao Bajo ===
- Carretera 3
- Carretera 184
- Carretera 755
- Sector Ancones Sifón
- Sector La Herradura
- Sector Los Pompos
- Sector Margote
- Sector Obén
- Sector Raja Larga
- Sector Sabana
- Sector Seboruco
- Sector Túnel Sabana
- Sector Yaurel Chiquito
- Urbanización Estancias de Aurora
- Urbanización Las Violetas

=== Egozcue ===
- Carretera 181
- Carretera 7759
- Sector Betancourt
- Sector Calanse
- Sector Campusu
- Sector Cuatro Calles
- Sector El Coquí
- Sector Guaraguao
- Sector Huertas
- Sector Pedragón

=== Guardarraya ===
- Calle Buena Vista
- Calle Ceiba
- Calle Monte Mar
- Calle Monte
- Calle Vista Alegre
- Calle Vista Horizonte
- Calle Vista Mar
- Calle Vista Monte
- Carretera 3
- Carretera 7758
- Centro Cooperativo
- Comunidad Guardarraya
- Sector Cofresí
- Sector La Mina
- Sector Mala Pascua
- Sector Recio
- Sector San Bartolo
- Sector Tamarindo

=== Jacaboa ===
- Calle El Fuego
- Carretera 3
- Carretera 758
- Sector Barro Blanco
- Sector Higuero (Carretera 7755)
- Sector Lamboglia
- Sector Malagueta
- Sector Mercado
- Sector Merle
- Sector Palenque
- Sector Villa Marina
- Sector Villa Pesquera
- Solares Dr. Dávila
- Urbanización Portales de Jacaboa
- Urbanización Solimar

=== Jagual ===
- Carretera 184
- Sector Caimito
- Sector Charco La Huerta
- Sector El Conejo Blanco
- Sector La Cuesta del Cuco
- Sector La Luna
- Sector La Playita
- Sector La Prá
- Sector Lebrón
- Sector Puerca Prieta
- Sector Represa
- Sector Suro
- Sector Vietnam

=== Mamey ===
- Carretera 757
- Condominios Buenos Aires
- Égida Del Bosque
- Sector La Cuchilla
- Sector Limones
- Sector Loma del Viento
- Sector Río Chico
- Sector Santo Domingo
- Sector Vietnam
- Urbanización Valle Verde
- Urbanización Villa Esperanza
- Urbanización Villas de Jerusalén

=== Marín ===
- Calle Jesús T. Piñero
- Carretera 181
- Carretera 799
- Condominios Patillas
- Condominios Santana
- Residencial Esmeralda del Sur
- Residencial Villa Real
- Salida hacia Marín
- Sector Campito Los Soto
- Sector Isidro Ruíz
- Sector La Felícita
- Sector La Línea
- Sector La Patilla
- Sector Los Barros
- Sector Los Tres Puntos
- Sector Mamey Chiquito
- Sector Marín Alto
- Sector Marín Bajo
- Sector Matadero
- Urbanización Brisas de la Esmeralda
- Urbanización El Paraíso
- Urbanización Remanso
- Urbanización San José
- Urbanización Valle Alto
- Urbanización Valles de Patillas

=== Mulas ===
- Carretera 184
- Carretera 754
- Sector Anón
- Sector Icaco
- Sector Las Delicias
- Sector Neris
- Sector Pueblito
- Sector Sofía

=== Muñoz Rivera ===
- Carretera 179
- Carretera 184
- Sector El Campamento Real
- Sector Los Tres Chorros
- Sector Miraflores
- Sector Palma Sola
- Sector Real
- Sector Riachuelo
- Sector Río Arriba
- Sector Sonadora

=== Patillas barrio-pueblo ===
- Residencial Villa del Caribe
- Urbanización Jardines de Patillas
- Urbanización Jardines del Mamey
- Urbanización Joseira
- Urbanización Mariani
- Urbanización Melissa
- Urbanización Parque del Sol
- Urbanización San Benito
- Urbanización San Martín
- Urbanización Villas de Patillas

=== Pollos ===
- Calle Acueducto
- Calle Alberto Ricci
- Calle Canario
- Calle Cerezos
- Calle Cristo
- Calle Culto
- Calle El Hoyo
- Calle Félix Portugués
- Calle Flamboyán
- Calle Francisco Ortiz Lebrón
- Calle Guillermo Riefkhol
- Calle Helechos
- Calle Iglesia
- Calle Jesús T. Piñero
- Calle Las Flores
- Calle Las Rosas
- Calle Luna
- Calle Margarita
- Calle Muñoz Rivera
- Calle Octavio Rivera
- Calle Recreo
- Calle Reymundo Fernández
- Calle Robles
- Calle Salsipuedes
- Calle Santiago Iglesias
- Calle Tamarindo
- Calle Yarino
- Carretera 3
- Carretera 757
- Carretera 7757
- Parcelas Nuevas
- Parcelas Viejas (Calles 1, 2, 3, 4)
- Sector Caguitas
- Sector La Ceiba
- Sector La Luna
- Sector La Plo
- Sector Mariani
- Sector Providencia
- Sector Pueblito Nuevo
- Sector Tres Puertas
- Urbanización Montecielo
- Urbanización Valle de la Providencia

=== Quebrada Arriba ===
- Carretera 184
- Carretera 762
- Sector Fondo del Saco
- Sector Las Parcelas
- Sector Los Cafeítos

=== Ríos ===
- Carretera 184
- Carretera 758
- Carretera 762
- Sector Avispas
- Sector Fondo del Saco
- Sector Las Parcelas
- Sector Los Cafeítos
- Sector Los Morales
- Sector Los Ríos

== See also ==
- List of communities in Puerto Rico
