= List of communities in Puerto Rico =

List of barrios and subbarrios of Puerto Rico

In the archipelago and island of Puerto Rico, there are 78 municipalities which are second-level administrative divisions, and 902 barrios proper, consisting of 828 barrios and 74 barrios-pueblos, (Note: Those barrios called "barrio-pueblo" were called "pueblo" until they were renamed "barrio-pueblo" by the US 1990 US Census. However, the locals, who don't work with the Census, still call it just "pueblo", or "el pueblo" (the pueblo)) serving as third-level divisions. Barrios are subdivided into numerous subbarrios, districts, communities, and/or sectors. In 2010, ten of the barrios are further subdivided into 145 subbarrios. (There is no United States equivalent to subbarrios.) Furthermore, as a U.S. territory without sovereignty, Puerto Rico does not have first-level administrative divisions akin to regions, states, provinces, or departments.

The following is a list of the 902 barrios, and some subbarrios, including the 40 subbarrios of Santurce, which is a barrio of San Juan, and communities (comunidad, on the U.S. Census) arranged in alphabetical order.

78 municipalities of Puerto Rico

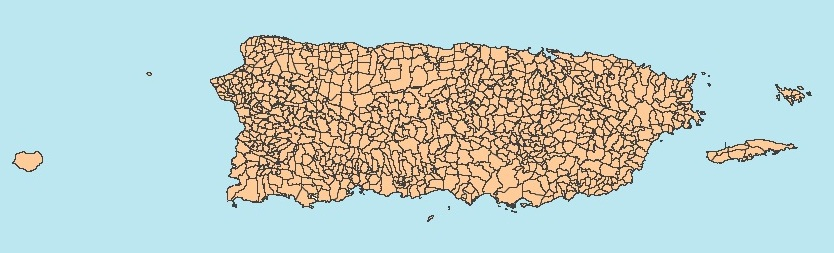
902 barrios of Puerto Rico

== A ==
- Abra Honda, Camuy
- Abras, Corozal
- Aceitunas, Moca
- Achiote, Naranjito
- Adjuntas barrio-pueblo
- Aguacate, Aguadilla
- Aguacate, Yabucoa
- Aguada barrio-pueblo
- Aguadilla barrio-pueblo
- Aguas Blancas, Yauco
- Aguas Buenas barrio-pueblo
- Aguirre, Salinas
- Aibonito, Hatillo
- Aibonito, San Sebastián
- Aibonito barrio-pueblo
- Ala de la Piedra, Orocovis
- Algarrobo, Aibonito
- Algarrobo, Guayama
- Algarrobo, Vega Baja
- Algarrobo, Yauco
- Algarrobos, Mayagüez
- Almácigo Alto, Yauco
- Almácigo Bajo, Yauco
- Almirante Norte, Vega Baja
- Almirante Sur, Vega Baja
- Alto del Cabro subbarrio, Santurce
- Alto Sano, Las Marías
- Alto Sano, San Sebastián
- Amparo subbarrio, Universidad
- Amuelas, Juana Díaz
- Añasco Abajo, Añasco
- Añasco Arriba, Añasco
- Añasco barrio-pueblo
- Ancones, Arroyo
- Ancones, San Germán
- Ángeles, Utuado
- Anón, Ponce
- Anones, Las Marías
- Anones, Naranjito
- Antón Ruíz, Humacao
- Apeadero, Patillas
- Arecibo barrio-pueblo
- Arena, Guánica
- Arenalejos, Arecibo
- Arenales, Aguadilla
- Arenales Altos, Isabela
- Arenales Bajos, Isabela
- Arenas, Cidra
- Arenas, Utuado
- Arroyo barrio-pueblo
- Arrozal, Arecibo
- Asomante, Aguada
- Asomante, Aibonito
- Atalaya, Aguada
- Atalaya, Rincón
- Auxilio Mutuo subbarrio, Universidad

== B ==
- Bahomamey, San Sebastián
- Bairoa, Aguas Buenas
- Bairoa, Caguas
- Bajadero, Arecibo
- Bajo, Patillas
- Bajura, Cabo Rojo
- Bajura, Isabela
- Bajura, Vega Alta
- Bajura Adentro, Manatí
- Bajura Afuera, Manatí
- Ballajá subbarrio, San Juan Antiguo
- Barahona, Morovis
- Barceloneta barrio-pueblo
- Barina, Yauco
- Barrancas, Barranquitas
- Barranquitas barrio-pueblo
- Barrazas, Carolina
- Barreal, Peñuelas
- Barrero, Guayanilla
- Barrero, Rincón
- Barros, Orocovis
- Bartolo, Lares
- Bateyes, Mayagüez
- Bauta Abajo, Orocovis
- Bauta Arriba, Orocovis
- Bayamón, Cidra
- Bayamón barrio-pueblo
- Bayamoncito, Aguas Buenas
- Bayaney, Hatillo
- Bayola subbarrio, Santurce
- Beatriz, Caguas
- Beatriz, Cayey
- Beatriz, Cidra
- Bejucos, Isabela
- Bella Vista subbarrio, Hato Rey Sur
- Benavente, Hormigueros
- Bermejales, Orocovis
- Boca, Guayanilla
- Boca Velázquez, Santa Isabel
- Boquerón, Las Piedras
- Boquerón, Cabo Rojo
- Bolívar subbarrio, Santurce
- Borinquen, Aguadilla
- Borinquen, Caguas
- Borinquen subbarrio, Oriente
- Botijas, Orocovis
- Bucaná, Ponce
- Bucarabones, Las Marías
- Bucarabones, Maricao
- Buen Consejo subbarrio, Pueblo
- Buena Vista, Bayamón
- Buena Vista, Carolina
- Buena Vista, Hatillo
- Buena Vista, Humacao
- Buena Vista, Las Marías
- Buenos Aires, Lares
- Buenos Aires subbarrio, Santurce

== C ==
- Cabezas, Fajardo
- Cabo Caribe, Vega Baja
- Cabo Rojo barrio-pueblo
- Cacao, Carolina
- Cacao, Quebradillas
- Cacao Alto, Patillas
- Cacao Bajo, Patillas
- Cacaos, Orocovis
- Caguabo, Añasco
- Caguana, Utuado
- Caguas barrio-pueblo
- Cagüitas, Aguas Buenas
- Caimital Alto, Aguadilla
- Caimital Bajo, Aguadilla
- Caimital, Guayama
- Caimito, Juncos
- Caimito, San Juan
- Caimito, Yauco
- Caín Alto, San Germán
- Caín Bajo, San Germán
- Calabazas, San Sebastián
- Calabazas, Yabucoa
- Callabo, Juana Díaz
- Callejones, Lares
- Calvache, Rincón
- Calzada, Maunabo
- Camaceyes, Aguadilla
- Camarones, Guaynabo
- Cambalache, Arecibo
- Camino Nuevo, Yabucoa
- Campo Alegre, Hatillo
- Campo Alegre subbarrio, Santurce
- Camuy Arriba, Camuy
- Camuy barrio-pueblo
- Cañabón, Barranquitas
- Cañabon, Caguas
- Cañaboncito, Caguas
- Canas, Ponce
- Canas Urbano, Ponce
- Candelaria, Lajas
- Candelaria, Toa Baja
- Candelaria, Vega Alta
- Candelero Abajo, Humacao
- Candelero Arriba, Humacao
- Cangrejo Arriba, Carolina
- Caníaco, Utuado
- Canóvanas, Canóvanas
- Canóvanas, Loíza
- Canóvanas barrio-pueblo
- Canovanillas, Carolina
- Caño, Guánica
- Caonillas Abajo, Utuado
- Caonillas Abajo, Villalba
- Caonillas Arriba, Utuado
- Caonillas Arriba, Villalba
- Caonillas, Aibonito
- Capá, Moca
- Capáez, Adjuntas
- Capáez, Hatillo
- Capetillo subbarrio, Pueblo
- Capitanejo, Juana Díaz
- Capitanejo, Ponce
- Caracol, Añasco
- Carenero, Guánica
- Carite, Guayama
- Carmen, Guayama
- Carolina barrio-pueblo
- Carraízo, Trujillo Alto
- Carreras, Añasco
- Carreras, Arecibo
- Carrizal, Aguada
- Carrizales, Hatillo
- Carruzos, Carolina
- Casey Abajo, Añasco
- Casey Arriba, Añasco
- Cataño, Humacao
- Cataño barrio-pueblo
- Catedral subbarrio, San Juan Antiguo
- Cayaguas, San Lorenzo
- Cayey barrio-pueblo
- Cedrito, Comerío
- Cedro, Carolina
- Cedro, Cayey
- Cedro, Guayanilla
- Cedro Abajo, Naranjito
- Cedro Arriba, Naranjito
- Ceiba, Cidra
- Ceiba, Las Piedras
- Ceiba, Vega Baja
- Ceiba barrio-pueblo
- Ceiba Alta, Aguadilla
- Ceiba Baja, Aguadilla
- Ceiba Norte, Juncos
- Ceiba Sur, Juncos
- Cejas, Comerío
- Celada, Gurabo
- Central Aguirre, Salinas
- Centro, Moca
- Cercadillo, Cayey
- Cerrillos, Ponce
- Cerro Gordo, Aguada
- Cerro Gordo, Añasco
- Cerro Gordo, Bayamón
- Cerro Gordo, Moca
- Cerro Gordo, San Lorenzo
- Cerrote, Las Marías
- Certenejas, Cidra
- Chamorro, Las Marías
- Charcas, Quebradillas
- Chícharo subbarrio, Santurce
- Chupacallos, Ceiba
- Ciales barrio-pueblo
- Cialitos, Ciales
- Cibao, Camuy
- Cibao, San Sebastián
- Cibuco, Corozal
- Cibuco, Vega Baja
- Cidra, Añasco
- Cidra barrio-pueblo
- Cidral, San Sebastián
- Ciénaga, Guánica
- Ciénaga Alta, Río Grande
- Ciénaga Baja, Río Grande
- Ciénagas, Camuy
- Cienegueta, Vega Alta
- Cintrona, Juana Díaz
- Ciudad Nueva subbarrio, Hato Rey Central
- Coabey, Jayuya
- Coamo Arriba, Coamo
- Coamo barrio-pueblo
- Cocos, Quebradillas
- Collores, Humacao
- Collores, Jayuya
- Collores, Juana Díaz
- Collores, Las Piedras
- Collores, Orocovis
- Collores, Yauco
- Comerío barrio-pueblo
- Condadito subbarrio, Santurce
- Condado subbarrio, Santurce
- Consejo, Guayanilla
- Consejo, Utuado
- Contorno, Toa Alta
- Corcovada, Añasco
- Corcovado, Hatillo
- Cordillera, Ciales
- Corozal barrio-pueblo
- Corrales, Aguadilla
- Costa, Lajas
- Coto, Isabela
- Coto, Peñuelas
- Coto Laurel, Ponce
- Coto Norte, Manatí
- Coto Sur, Manatí
- Cotuí, San Germán
- Cruces, Aguada
- Cruces, Rincón
- Cruz, Moca
- Cuarto, Ponce
- Cubuy, Canóvanas
- Cuchillas, Corozal
- Cuchillas, Moca
- Cuchillas, Morovis
- Cuebas, Peñuelas
- Cuevas, Trujillo Alto
- Culebra barrio-pueblo
- Culebras Alto, Cayey
- Culebras Bajo, Cayey
- Culebrinas, San Sebastián
- Cupey, San Juan
- Cuyón, Aibonito
- Cuyón, Coamo

== D ==
- Daguao, Ceiba
- Daguao, Naguabo
- Dagüey, Añasco
- Dajaos, Bayamón
- Damián Abajo, Orocovis
- Damián Arriba, Orocovis
- Demajagua, Fajardo
- Descalabrado, Santa Isabel
- Diego Hernández, Yauco
- Domingo Ruíz, Arecibo
- Dominguito, Arecibo
- Don Alonso, Utuado
- Doña Elena, Comerío
- Dorado barrio-pueblo
- Dos Bocas, Corozal
- Dos Bocas, Trujillo Alto
- Duey, Yauco
- Duey Alto, San Germán
- Duey Bajo, San Germán
- Duque, Naguabo

== E ==
- Egozcue, Patillas
- El Cerro, Gurabo
- El Cinco, San Juan
- El Maní, Mayagüez
- El Río, Las Piedras
- El Vedado subbarrio, Hato Rey Norte
- Eleanor Roosevelt subbarrio, Hato Rey Norte
- Emajagua, Maunabo
- Emajagual, Juana Díaz
- Encarnación, Peñuelas
- Eneas, San Sebastián
- Ensenada, Guánica
- Ensenada, Rincón
- Esperanza, Arecibo
- Esperanza, Vieques
- Espinar, Aguada
- Espino, Añasco
- Espino, Lares
- Espino, Las Marías
- Espino, San Lorenzo
- Espinosa, Dorado
- Espinosa, Vega Alta

== F ==
- Factor, Arecibo
- Fajardo barrio-pueblo
- Farallón, Cayey
- Felicia 1, Santa Isabel
- Felicia 2, Santa Isabel
- Figueroa subbarrio, Santurce
- Flamenco, Culebra
- Floral Park subbarrio, Hato Rey Central
- Florencio, Fajardo
- Florida, San Lorenzo
- Florida, Vieques
- Florida Adentro, Florida
- Florida Afuera, Barceloneta
- Fraile, Culebra
- Frailes, Guaynabo
- Frailes, Yauco
- Fránquez, Morovis
- Frontón, Ciales
- Furnias, Las Marías

== G ==
- Galateo, Toa Alta
- Galateo Alto, Isabela
- Galateo Bajo, Isabela
- Gandul subbarrio, Santurce
- Garrochales, Arecibo
- Garrochales, Barceloneta
- Garzas, Adjuntas
- Gato, Orocovis
- Gobernador Piñero, San Juan
- Guacio, San Sebastián
- Guadiana, Naranjito
- Guajataca, Quebradillas
- Guajataca, San Sebastián
- Guamá, San Germán
- Guamaní, Guayama
- Guanábano, Aguada
- Guanajibo, Cabo Rojo
- Guanajibo, Hormigueros
- Guanajibo, Mayagüez
- Guánica barrio-pueblo
- Guaniquilla, Aguada
- Guaonico, Utuado
- Guaraguao, Guaynabo
- Guaraguao, Ponce
- Guaraguao Abajo, Bayamón
- Guaraguao Arriba, Bayamón
- Guardarraya, Patillas
- Guásimas, Arroyo
- Guatemala, San Sebastián
- Guavate, Cayey
- Guayabal, Juana Díaz
- Guayabo, Aguada
- Guayabo Dulce, Adjuntas
- Guayabos, Isabela
- Guayabota, Yabucoa
- Guayacán, Ceiba
- Guayama barrio-pueblo
- Guayanilla barrio-pueblo
- Guaynabo barrio-pueblo
- Guayo, Adjuntas
- Guerrero, Aguadilla
- Guerrero, Isabela
- Guilarte, Adjuntas
- Gurabo barrio-pueblo
- Gurabo Abajo, Juncos
- Gurabo Arriba, Juncos
- Guzmán Abajo, Río Grande
- Guzmán Arriba, Río Grande

== H ==
- Hatillo, Añasco
- Hatillo, Hatillo
- Hatillo barrio-pueblo
- Hato, San Lorenzo
- Hato Abajo, Arecibo
- Hato Arriba, Arecibo
- Hato Arriba, San Sebastián
- Hato Nuevo, Guaynabo
- Hato Nuevo, Gurabo
- Hato Puerco Abajo, Villalba
- Hato Puerco Arriba, Villalba
- Hato Puerco, Canóvanas
- Hato Rey, San Juan
- Hato Rey Central, San Juan
- Hato Rey Norte, San Juan
- Hato Rey Sur, San Juan
- Hato Tejas, Bayamón
- Hato Viejo, Arecibo
- Hato Viejo, Ciales
- Hayales, Coamo
- Helechal, Barranquitas
- Herrera subbarrio, Santurce
- Herreras, Río Grande
- Higuillar, Dorado
- Hipódromo subbarrio, Santurce
- Hoare subbarrio, Santurce
- Hoconuco Alto, San Germán
- Hoconuco Bajo, San Germán
- Honduras, Barranquitas
- Honduras, Cidra
- Hormigueros, Hormigueros
- Hormigueros barrio-pueblo
- Hoya Mala, San Sebastián
- Húcares, Naguabo
- Humacao barrio-pueblo
- Humatas, Añasco
- Hyde Park subbarrio, Hato Rey Sur

== I ==
- Indiera Alta, Maricao
- Indiera Baja, Maricao
- Indiera Fría, Maricao
- Indios, Guayanilla
- Institución subbarrio, Universidad
- Isabel II barrio-pueblo, Vieques
- Isabela barrio-pueblo
- Isla de Mona e Islote Monito, Mayagüez
- Isla Grande subbarrio, Santurce
- Isla Verde, Carolina
- Islote, Arecibo

== J ==
- Jacaboa, Patillas
- Jacaguas, Juana Díaz
- Jácana, Yauco
- Jácanas, Yabucoa
- Jagua Pasto, Guayanilla
- Jagual, Patillas
- Jagual, San Lorenzo
- Jaguar, Gurabo
- Jaguas, Ciales
- Jaguas, Guayanilla
- Jaguas, Gurabo
- Jaguas, Peñuelas
- Jagüey, Aguada
- Jagüey, Rincón
- Jagüeyes, Aguas Buenas
- Jagüitas, Hormigueros
- Jájome Alto, Cayey
- Jájome Bajo, Cayey
- Jauca 1, Santa Isabel
- Jauca 2, Santa Isabel
- Jauca, Jayuya
- Jayuya Abajo, Jayuya
- Jayuya barrio-pueblo
- Jiménez, Río Grande
- Jobos, Guayama
- Jobos, Isabela
- Joyuda, Cabo Rojo
- Juan Alonso, Mayagüez
- Juan Asencio, Aguas Buenas
- Juan González, Adjuntas
- Juan Martín, Luquillo
- Juan Martín, Yabucoa
- Juan Sánchez, Bayamón
- Juana Díaz barrio-pueblo
- Juncal, San Sebastián
- Juncos barrio-pueblo

== L ==
- La Gloria, Trujillo Alto
- La Perla, San Juan
- La Torre, Lares
- La Zona subbarrio, Santurce
- La 37 subbarrio, Hato Rey Sur
- Lagunas, Aguada
- Lajas Arriba, Lajas
- Lajas barrio-pueblo
- Lajas, Lajas
- Lapa, Cayey
- Lapa, Salinas
- Lares, Lares
- Lares barrio-pueblo
- Las Casas subbarrio, Santurce
- Las Marías subbarrio, Santurce
- Las Marías barrio-pueblo
- Las Monjas subbarrio, Hato Rey Central
- Las Palmas subbarrio, Santurce
- Las Palmas, Utuado
- Las Piedras barrio-pueblo
- Lavadero, Hormigueros
- Leguísamo, Mayagüez
- Levittown, Toa Baja
- Limaní, Adjuntas
- Limón, Mayagüez
- Limón, Utuado
- Limones, Yabucoa
- Lirios, Juncos
- Lizas, Maunabo
- Llanadas, Isabela
- Llano, Guayanilla
- Llanos, Aibonito
- Llanos, Lajas
- Llanos Costa, Cabo Rojo
- Llanos Tuna, Cabo Rojo
- Llave, Vieques
- Loíza subbarrio, Santurce
- Loíza barrio-pueblo
- Lomas, Canóvanas
- Lomas, Juana Díaz
- Lomas, Naranjito
- López Sicardó subbarrio, Oriente
- Los Llanos, Coamo
- Luquillo barrio-pueblo

== M ==
- Mabú, Humacao
- Macaná, Guayanilla
- Macaná, Peñuelas
- Machete, Guayama
- Machos, Ceiba
- Machuchal, Sabana Grande
- Machuchal subbarrio, Santurce
- Machuelo Abajo, Ponce
- Machuelo Arriba, Ponce
- Magas, Guayanilla
- Magos, San Sebastián
- Maguayo, Dorado
- Magueyes, Corozal
- Magueyes, Ponce
- Magueyes Urbano, Ponce
- Maizales, Naguabo
- Mal Paso, Aguada
- Maleza Alta, Aguadilla
- Maleza Baja, Aguadilla
- Malezas, Mayagüez
- Mambiche, Humacao
- Mamey, Aguada
- Mamey, Guaynabo
- Mamey, Gurabo
- Mamey, Juncos
- Mamey, Patillas
- Mameyal, Dorado
- Mameyes Abajo, Utuado
- Mameyes Arriba, Jayuya
- Mameyes I, Luquillo
- Mameyes II, Río Grande
- Maná, Corozal
- Manatí barrio-pueblo
- Maragüez, Ponce
- Maravilla Este, Las Marías
- Maravilla Norte, Las Marías
- Maravilla Sur, Las Marías
- Maresúa, San Germán
- María Moczó subbarrio, Santurce
- Mariana, Humacao
- Mariana, Naguabo
- Marías, Aguada
- Marías, Añasco
- Marías, Moca
- Maricao, Vega Alta
- Maricao Afuera, Maricao
- Maricao barrio-pueblo
- Marín, Patillas
- Marruecos subbarrio, Santurce
- Martín González, Carolina
- Martín Peña subbarrio, Hato Rey Norte
- Martín Peña subbarrio, Santurce
- Marueño, Ponce
- Masa, Gurabo
- Mata de Cañas, Orocovis
- Mata de Plátano, Luquillo
- Matón Abajo, Cayey
- Matón Arriba, Cayey
- Matuyas Alto, Maunabo
- Matuyas Bajo, Maunabo
- Maunabo barrio-pueblo
- Mavilla, Vega Alta
- Mayagüez Arriba, Mayagüez
- Mayagüez barrio-pueblo
- Media Luna, Toa Baja
- Medianía Alta, Loíza
- Medianía Baja, Loíza
- Melilla subbarrio, Santurce
- Membrillo, Camuy
- Mercado subbarrio, San Juan Antiguo
- Merhoff subbarrio, Santurce
- Milla de Oro, San Juan
- Minillas, Bayamón
- Minillas, San Germán
- Minillas subbarrio, Santurce
- Mirabales, San Sebastián
- Miradero, Cabo Rojo
- Miradero, Mayagüez
- Miraflores, Añasco
- Miraflores, Arecibo
- Mirasol, Lares
- Miramar subbarrio, Santurce
- Moca barrio-pueblo
- Monacillo, San Juan
- Monacillo Urbano, San Juan
- Montalva, Guánica
- Montaña, Aguadilla
- Monte Grande, Cabo Rojo
- Monte Llano, Cayey
- Monte Llano, Cidra
- Monte Llano, Morovis
- Monteflores, Santurce
- Montes Llanos, Ponce
- Monte Rey subbarrio, Pueblo
- Montones, Las Piedras
- Montoso, Maricao
- Montoso, Mayagüez
- Mora, Isabela
- Morovis barrio-pueblo
- Morovis Norte, Morovis
- Morovis Sud, Morovis
- Mosquito, Vieques
- Mucarabones, Toa Alta
- Mula, Aguas Buenas
- Mulas, Patillas
- Mulita, Aguas Buenas
- Muñoz Rivera, Patillas

== N ==
- Naguabo barrio-pueblo
- Naranjales, Las Marías
- Naranjales, Mayagüez
- Naranjito, Hatillo
- Naranjito barrio-pueblo
- Naranjo, Aguada
- Naranjo, Comerío
- Naranjo, Fajardo
- Naranjo, Moca
- Naranjo, Yauco
- Navarro, Gurabo
- Negros, Corozal
- Nuevo, Bayamón
- Nuevo, Naranjito

== O ==
- Obrero subbarrio, Santurce
- Ocean Park subbarrio, Santurce
- Oriente, San Juan
- Orocovis, Orocovis
- Orocovis barrio-pueblo
- Ortíz, Toa Alta
- Ovejas, Añasco

== P ==
- Padilla, Corozal
- Pájaros, Bayamón
- Palma Escrita, Las Marías
- Palma Sola, Canóvanas
- Palmar, Aguadilla
- Palmarejo, Coamo
- Palmarejo, Corozal
- Palmarejo, Lajas
- Palmarito, Corozal
- Palmas, Arroyo
- Palmas, Cataño
- Palmas, Guayama
- Palmas, Salinas
- Palmas Altas, Barceloneta
- Palmas del Mar, Humacao
- Palmer, Río Grande
- Palo Hincado, Barranquitas
- Palo Seco, Maunabo
- Palo Seco, Toa Baja
- Palomas, Comerío
- Palos Blancos, Corozal
- Parguera, Lajas
- Parque subbarrio, Santurce
- París, Lajas
- Paso Palma, Utuado
- Pasto, Aibonito
- Pasto, Coamo
- Pasto, Guayanilla
- Pasto, Morovis
- Pasto Viejo, Cayey
- Patillas barrio-pueblo
- Pedernales, Cabo Rojo
- Pedro Ávila, Cayey
- Pedro García, Coamo
- Pellejas, Adjuntas
- Pellejas, Orocovis
- Peña Pobre, Naguabo
- Peñuelas barrio-pueblo
- Perchas, Morovis
- Perchas 1, San Sebastián
- Perchas 2, San Sebastián
- Pesas, Ciales
- Pezuela, Lares
- Pica, Jayuya
- Piedra Gorda, Camuy
- Piedras, Cayey
- Piedras Blancas, Aguada
- Piedras Blancas, San Sebastián
- Piletas, Lares
- Piñales, Añasco
- Piñas, Comerío
- Piñas, Toa Alta
- Pitahaya, Arroyo
- Pitahaya, Luquillo
- Planas, Isabela
- Plata, Aibonito
- Plata, Lajas
- Plata, Moca
- Playa, Añasco
- Playa, Guayanilla
- Playa, Ponce
- Playa, Santa Isabel
- Playa, Yabucoa
- Playa Sardinas I, Culebra
- Playa Sardinas II, Culebra
- Poblado de Boquerón, Cabo Rojo
- Pollos, Patillas
- Portillo, Adjuntas
- Portugués, Adjuntas
- Portugués, Ponce
- Portugués Urbano, Ponce
- Pozas, Ciales
- Pozas, San Sebastián
- Pozo del Hato, Santurce
- Pozo Hondo, Guayama
- Primero, Ponce
- Pueblo, Corozal
- Pueblo, Lares
- Pueblo, Moca
- Pueblo, Rincón
- Pueblo, San Juan
- Pueblo of Ponce, Ponce
- Pueblo of Río Piedras, San Juan
- Pueblo of San Germán, San Germán
- Pueblo Viejo, Guaynabo
- Puente, Camuy
- Puerta de Tierra subbarrio, San Juan Antiguo
- Puerto Diablo, Vieques
- Puerto Ferro, Vieques
- Puerto Nuevo, Vega Baja
- Puerto Nuevo subbarrio, Hato Rey Norte
- Puerto Real, Vieques
- Puertos, Camuy
- Pugnado Adentro, Vega Baja
- Pugnado Afuera, Vega Baja
- Pulguero subbarrio, Santurce
- Pulguillas, Coamo
- Punta Arenas, Vieques
- Punta Santiago, Humacao
- Puntas, Rincón
- Purísima Concepción, Las Marías

== Q ==
- Quebrada, Camuy
- Quebrada, San Lorenzo
- Quebrada Arenas, Las Piedras
- Quebrada Arenas, Maunabo
- Quebrada Arenas, San Lorenzo
- Quebrada Arenas, Toa Alta
- Quebrada Arenas, Vega Baja
- Quebrada Arenas, San Juan
- Quebrada Arriba, Cayey
- Quebrada Arriba, Patillas
- Quebrada Ceiba, Peñuelas
- Quebrada Cruz, Toa Alta
- Quebrada Fajardo, Fajardo
- Quebrada Grande, Barranquitas
- Quebrada Grande, Mayagüez
- Quebrada Grande, Trujillo Alto
- Quebrada Honda, Guayanilla
- Quebrada Honda, San Lorenzo
- Quebrada Infierno, Gurabo
- Quebrada Larga, Añasco
- Quebrada Limón, Ponce
- Quebrada Negrito, Trujillo Alto
- Quebrada Seca, Ceiba
- Quebrada Vueltas, Fajardo
- Quebrada Yeguas, Salinas
- Quebradas, Guayanilla
- Quebradas, Yauco
- Quebradillas, Barranquitas
- Quebradillas barrio-pueblo
- Quemado, Mayagüez
- Quemados, San Lorenzo
- Quintana subbarrio, Hato Rey Central
- Quinto, Ponce

== R ==
- Rabanal, Cidra
- Ranchera, Yauco
- Rayo, Sabana Grande
- Real, Ponce
- Retiro, San Germán
- Rincón, Cayey
- Rincón, Cidra
- Rincón, Gurabo
- Rincón, Sabana Grande
- Rincón barrio-pueblo
- Río, Guaynabo
- Río, Naguabo
- Río Abajo, Ceiba
- Río Abajo, Cidra
- Río Abajo, Humacao
- Río Abajo, Utuado
- Río Abajo, Vega Baja
- Río Arriba, Añasco
- Río Arriba, Arecibo
- Río Arriba, Fajardo
- Río Arriba, Vega Baja
- Río Arriba Poniente, Manatí
- Río Arriba Saliente, Manatí
- Río Blanco, Naguabo
- Río Cañas, Añasco
- Río Cañas, Caguas
- Río Cañas, Las Marías
- Río Cañas Abajo, Juana Díaz
- Río Cañas Abajo, Mayagüez
- Río Cañas Arriba, Juana Díaz
- Río Cañas Arriba, Mayagüez
- Río Grande, Aguada
- Río Grande, Jayuya
- Río Grande, Morovis
- Río Grande, Rincón
- Río Grande barrio-pueblo
- Río Hondo, Comerío
- Río Hondo, Mayagüez
- Río Jueyes, Salinas
- Río Lajas, Dorado
- Río Lajas, Toa Alta
- Río Piedras, San Juan
- Río Piedras Antiguo subbarrio, Pueblo
- Río Prieto, Lares
- Río Prieto, Yauco
- Ríos, Patillas
- Robles, Aibonito
- Robles, San Sebastián
- Rocha, Moca
- Roncador, Utuado
- Rosario, Mayagüez
- Rosario Alto, San Germán
- Rosario Bajo, San Germán
- Rosario Peñón, San Germán
- Rubias, Yauco
- Rucio, Peñuelas
- Rufina, Guayanilla

== S ==
- Sábalos, Mayagüez
- Sabana, Luquillo
- Sabana, Orocovis
- Sabana, Vega Alta
- Sabana Abajo, Carolina
- Sabana Eneas, San Germán
- Sabana Grande, Utuado
- Sabana Grande Abajo, San Germán
- Sabana Grande barrio-pueblo
- Sabana Hoyos, Arecibo
- Sabana Llana, Juana Díaz
- Sabana Llana Norte, San Juan
- Sabana Llana Sur, San Juan
- Sabana Seca, Toa Baja
- Sabana Yeguas, Lajas
- Sabanetas, Mayagüez
- Sabanetas, Ponce
- Saco, Ceiba
- Sagrado Corazón subbarrio, Santurce
- Saliente, Jayuya
- Salinas barrio-pueblo
- Saltillo, Adjuntas
- Salto, Cidra
- Salto, San Sebastián
- Salto Abajo, Utuado
- Salto Arriba, Utuado
- Saltos, Orocovis
- San Antón, Carolina
- San Antón, Ponce
- San Antonio, Caguas
- San Antonio, Dorado
- San Antonio, Quebradillas
- San Cristóbal subbarrio, San Juan Antiguo
- San Francisco subbarrio, San Juan Antiguo
- San Germán barrio-pueblo
- San Ildefonso, Coamo
- San Isidro, Culebra
- San José, Quebradillas
- San José subbarrio, Oriente
- San Juan Antiguo, San Juan
- San Juan Moderno subbarrio, Santurce
- San Lorenzo, Morovis
- San Lorenzo barrio-pueblo
- San Mateo subbarrio, Santurce
- San Patricio, Ponce
- San Salvador, Caguas
- San Sebastián barrio-pueblo
- Santa Catalina, Coamo
- Santa Cruz, Carolina
- Santa Isabel, Utuado
- Santa Isabel barrio-pueblo
- Santa Olaya, Bayamón
- Santa Rita subbarrio, Hato Rey Sur
- Santa Rosa, Guaynabo
- Santa Rosa, Lajas
- Santa Rosa, Utuado
- Santana, Arecibo
- Santana, Sabana Grande
- Santiago, Camuy
- Santiago y Lima, Naguabo
- Santo Domingo, Peñuelas
- Santurce, San Juan
- Sardinera, Fajardo
- Seboruco subbarrio, Santurce
- Segundo, Ponce
- Sexto, Ponce
- Shanghai subbarrio, Santurce
- Sierra Alta, Yauco
- Sierra Baja, Guayanilla
- Sonador, San Sebastián
- Sonadora, Aguas Buenas
- Sonadora, Guaynabo
- St. Just, Trujillo Alto
- Stella, Rincón
- Sud, Cidra
- Sumidero, Aguas Buenas
- Sumido, Cayey
- Susúa, Sabana Grande
- Susúa Alta, Yauco
- Susúa Baja, Guánica
- Susúa Baja, Yauco

== T ==
- Tabonuco, Sabana Grande
- Talante, Maunabo
- Tallaboa Alta, Peñuelas
- Tallaboa Poniente, Peñuelas
- Tallaboa Saliente, Peñuelas
- Tanamá, Adjuntas
- Tanamá, Arecibo
- Tejas, Humacao
- Tejas, Las Piedras
- Tejas, Yabucoa
- Tercero, Ponce
- Terranova, Quebradillas
- Tetuán, Utuado
- Tibes, Ponce
- Tierras Nuevas Poniente, Manatí
- Tierras Nuevas Saliente, Manatí
- Tijeras, Juana Díaz
- Toa Alta barrio-pueblo
- Toa Baja barrio-pueblo
- Toíta, Cayey
- Toíta, Cidra
- Tomás de Castro, Caguas
- Toro Negro, Ciales
- Torre, Sabana Grande
- Torrecilla Alta, Canóvanas
- Torrecilla Alta, Loíza
- Torrecilla Baja, Loíza
- Torrecillas, Morovis
- Tortugo, San Juan
- Tras Talleres subbarrio, Santurce
- Trujillo Alto barrio-pueblo
- Trujillo Bajo, Carolina
- Tumbao, Maunabo
- Tuna, San Germán
- Turabo, Caguas

== U ==
- Ubarri subbarrio, Pueblo
- Unibón, Morovis
- Universidad, San Juan
- Utuado barrio-pueblo

== V ==
- Vacas, Villalba
- Vaga, Morovis
- Valencia subbarrio, Universidad
- Valenciano Abajo, Juncos
- Valenciano Arriba, Juncos
- Vayas, Ponce
- Vega Alta barrio-pueblo
- Vega Baja barrio-pueblo
- Vega Redonda, Comerío
- Vegas, Cayey
- Vegas, Yauco
- Vegas Abajo, Adjuntas
- Vegas Arriba, Adjuntas
- Veguitas, Jayuya
- Venezuela subbarrio, Pueblo
- Victoria, Aguadilla
- Viejo San Juan, San Juan
- Villalba Abajo, Villalba
- Villalba Arriba, Villalba
- Villalba barrio-pueblo
- Villa Palmeras subbarrio, Santurce
- Villa Sin Miedo, Canóvanas
- Viví Abajo, Utuado
- Viví Arriba, Utuado
- Voladoras, Moca

== Y ==
- Yabucoa barrio-pueblo
- Yahuecas, Adjuntas
- Yauco barrio-pueblo
- Yaurel, Arroyo
- Yayales, Adjuntas
- Yeguada, Camuy
- Yeguada, Vega Baja

== Z ==
- Zamas, Jayuya
- Zanja, Camuy
- Zarzal, Río Grande

== See also ==
- Pueblos in Puerto Rico
- Special Communities in Puerto Rico
- List of islands of Puerto Rico
