= Chico River (Puerto Rico) =

River of Puerto Rico

Coordinates: 17.9785779°N 66.0046080°W

- Native name: Río Chico (Spanish)

Location
- Commonwealth: Puerto Rico
- Municipality: Patillas

Physical characteristics
- Source
  - elevation: 3 ft.
- Mouth
  - location: Patillas Bay in Pollos, Patillas

The Chico River (Spanish: Río Chico) is a tidal channel of the Patillas Bay in the municipality of Patillas, Puerto Rico.

== See also ==
- List of rivers of Puerto Rico
