= Cacao Alto =

Barrio of Patillas, Puerto Rico

- Barrio
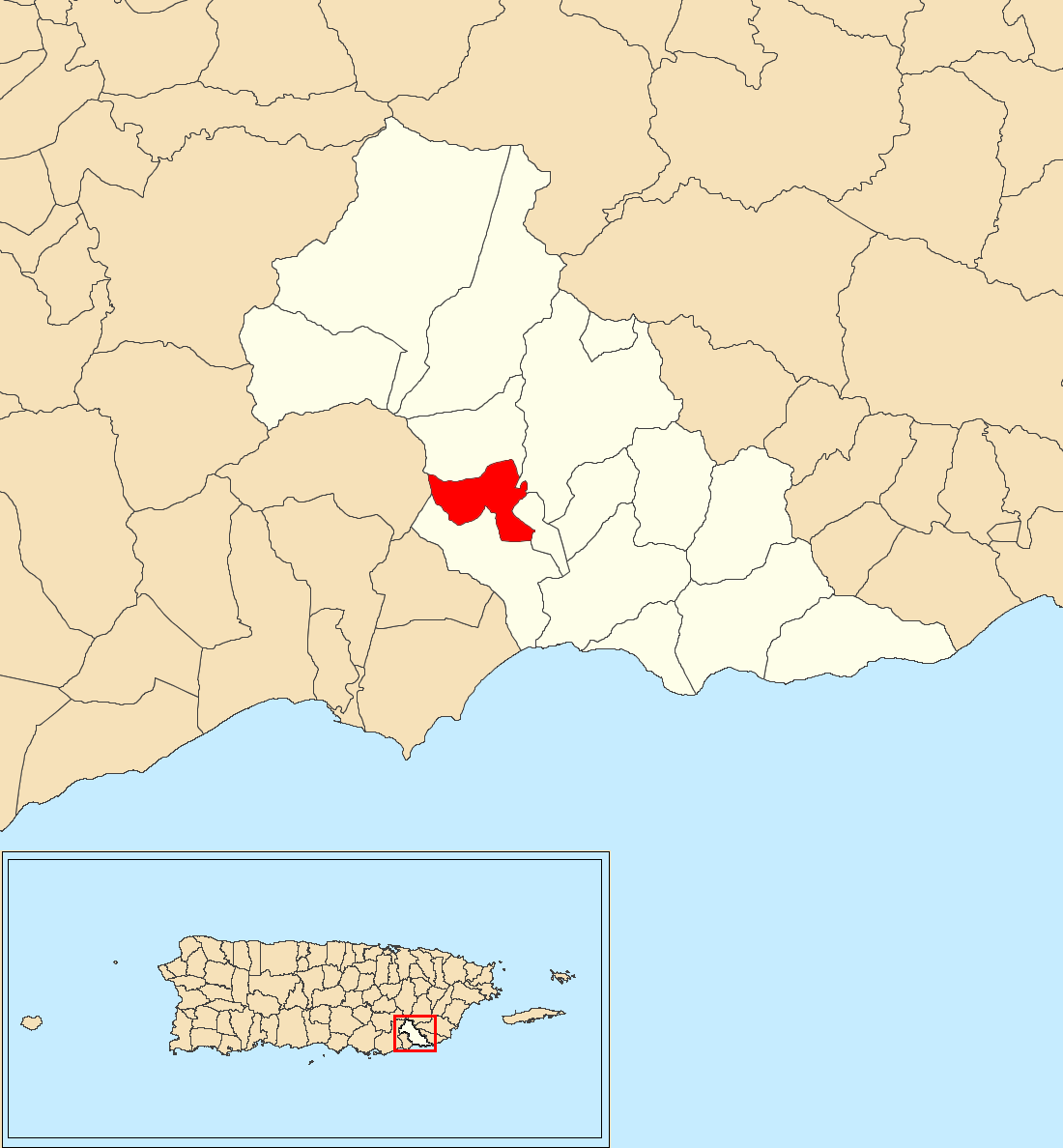
- Location of Cacao Alto within the municipality of Patillas shown in red

- Location of Puerto Rico
- Coordinates: 18°00′53″N 66°01′40″W
- Commonwealth: Puerto Rico
- Municipality: Patillas

Area
  - Total: 1.23 sq mi (3.2 km^{2})
  - Land: 1.11 sq mi (2.9 km^{2})
  - Water: 0.12 sq mi (0.31 km^{2})
- Elevation: 118 ft (36 m)

Population (2010)
  - Total: 2,449
  - Density: 2,206.3/sq mi (851.9/km^{2})
- Source: 2010 Census
- Time zone: UTC−4 (AST)
- ZIP Code: 00723
- Area code: 787/939

Cacao Alto is a barrio in the municipality of Patillas, Puerto Rico. Its population in 2010 was 2,449.

== History ==
Cacao Alto was in Spain's gazetteers until Puerto Rico was ceded by Spain in the aftermath of the Spanish–American War under the terms of the Treaty of Paris of 1898 and became an unincorporated territory of the United States. In 1899, the United States Department of War conducted a census of Puerto Rico finding that the combined population of Jagual and Cacao Alto barrios was 1,018.

Historical population
Census	Pop.	Note	%±
1910	481		—
1920	327		−32.0%
1930	465		42.2%
1940	571		22.8%
1950	1,094		91.6%
1960	1,059		−3.2%
1970	0		−100.0%
1980	1,252		—
1990	1,345		7.4%
2000	1,566		16.4%
2010	2,449		56.4%
U.S. Decennial Census; 1900 (N/A) 1910-1930; 1930-1950 1980-2000 2010

== See also ==
- List of communities in Puerto Rico
- List of barrios and sectors of Patillas, Puerto Rico
