= Apeadero =

Barrio of Patillas, Puerto Rico

- Barrio
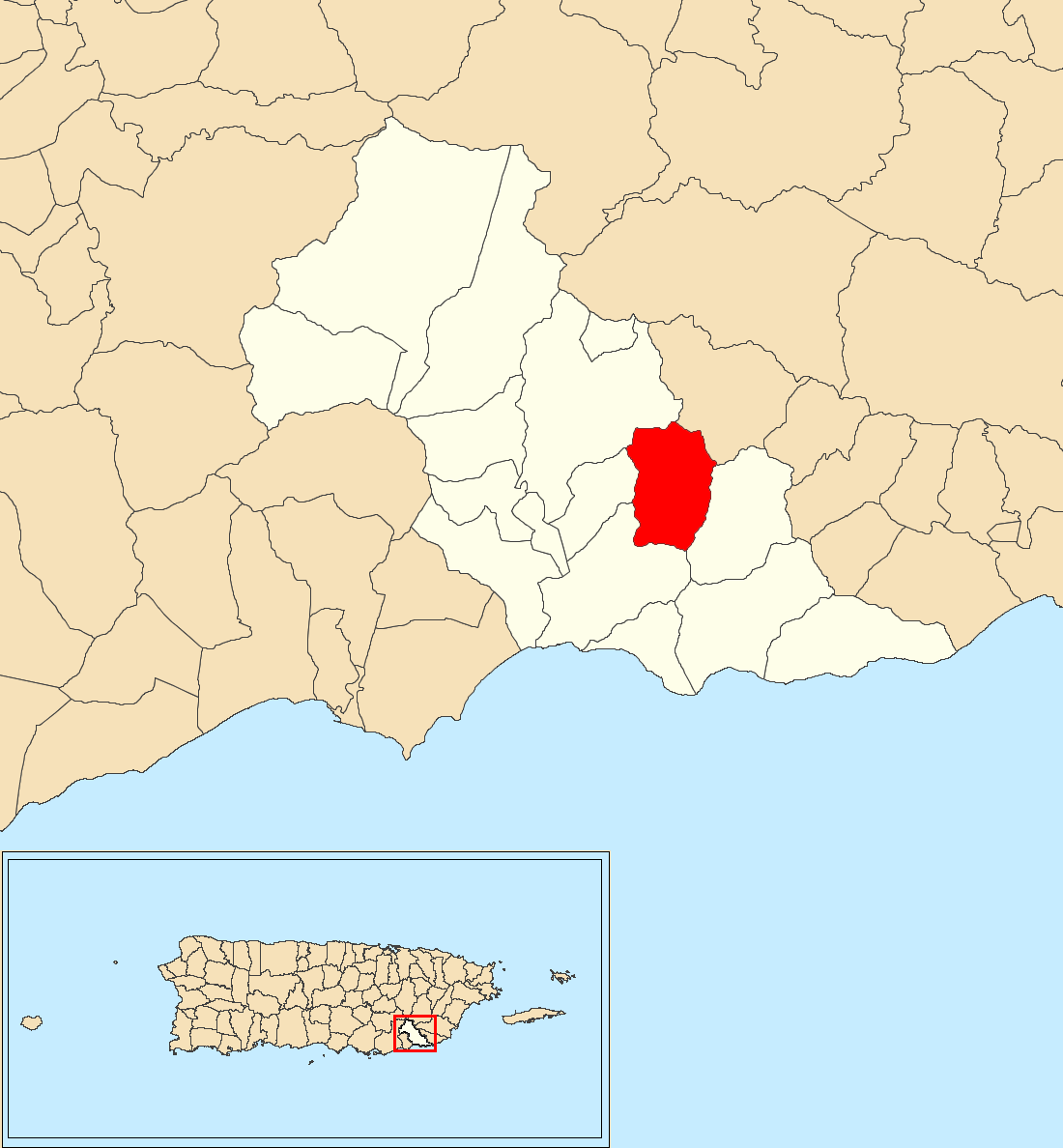
- Location of Apeadero within the municipality of Patillas shown in red

- Location of Puerto Rico
- Coordinates: 18°01′10″N 65°58′59″W
- Commonwealth: Puerto Rico
- Municipality: Patillas

Area
  - Total: 2.29 sq mi (5.9 km^{2})
  - Land: 2.29 sq mi (5.9 km^{2})
  - Water: 0 sq mi (0 km^{2})
- Elevation: 509 ft (155 m)

Population (2010)
  - Total: 699
  - Density: 305.2/sq mi (117.8/km^{2})
- Source: 2010 Census
- Time zone: UTC−4 (AST)
- ZIP Code: 00723
- Area code: 787/939

Apeadero is a barrio in the municipality of Patillas, Puerto Rico. Its population in 2010 was 699.

== History ==
Apeadero was in Spain's gazetteers until Puerto Rico was ceded by Spain in the aftermath of the Spanish–American War under the terms of the Treaty of Paris of 1898 and became an unincorporated territory of the United States. In 1899, the United States Department of War conducted a census of Puerto Rico finding that the combined population of Mamey and Apeadero barrios was 1,249.

Historical population
Census	Pop.	Note	%±
1910	892		—
1920	989		10.9%
1930	980		−0.9%
1940	1,216		24.1%
1950	1,079		−11.3%
1960	955		−11.5%
1970	801		−16.1%
1980	772		−3.6%
1990	606		−21.5%
2000	632		4.3%
2010	699		10.6%
U.S. Decennial Census; 1900 (N/A) 1910-1930; 1930-1950 1980-2000 2010

== Sectors ==
Barrios (which are, in contemporary times, roughly comparable to minor civil divisions) in turn are further subdivided into smaller local populated place areas/units called sectores (sectors in English). The types of sectores may vary, from normally sector to urbanización to reparto to barriada to residencial, among others.

The following sectors are in Apeadero barrio:

Carretera 757, Sector Acueducto, Sector Amill, Sector Campos, Sector Carrión, Sector Estrada, Sector Justo Rosa, Sector La Loma Final, Sector Los Morales, Sector Machuchal, and Sector Russi.

== See also ==
- List of communities in Puerto Rico
- List of barrios and sectors of Patillas, Puerto Rico
