= Mamey, Patillas, Puerto Rico =

Barrio of Puerto Rico

Mamey
- Barrio
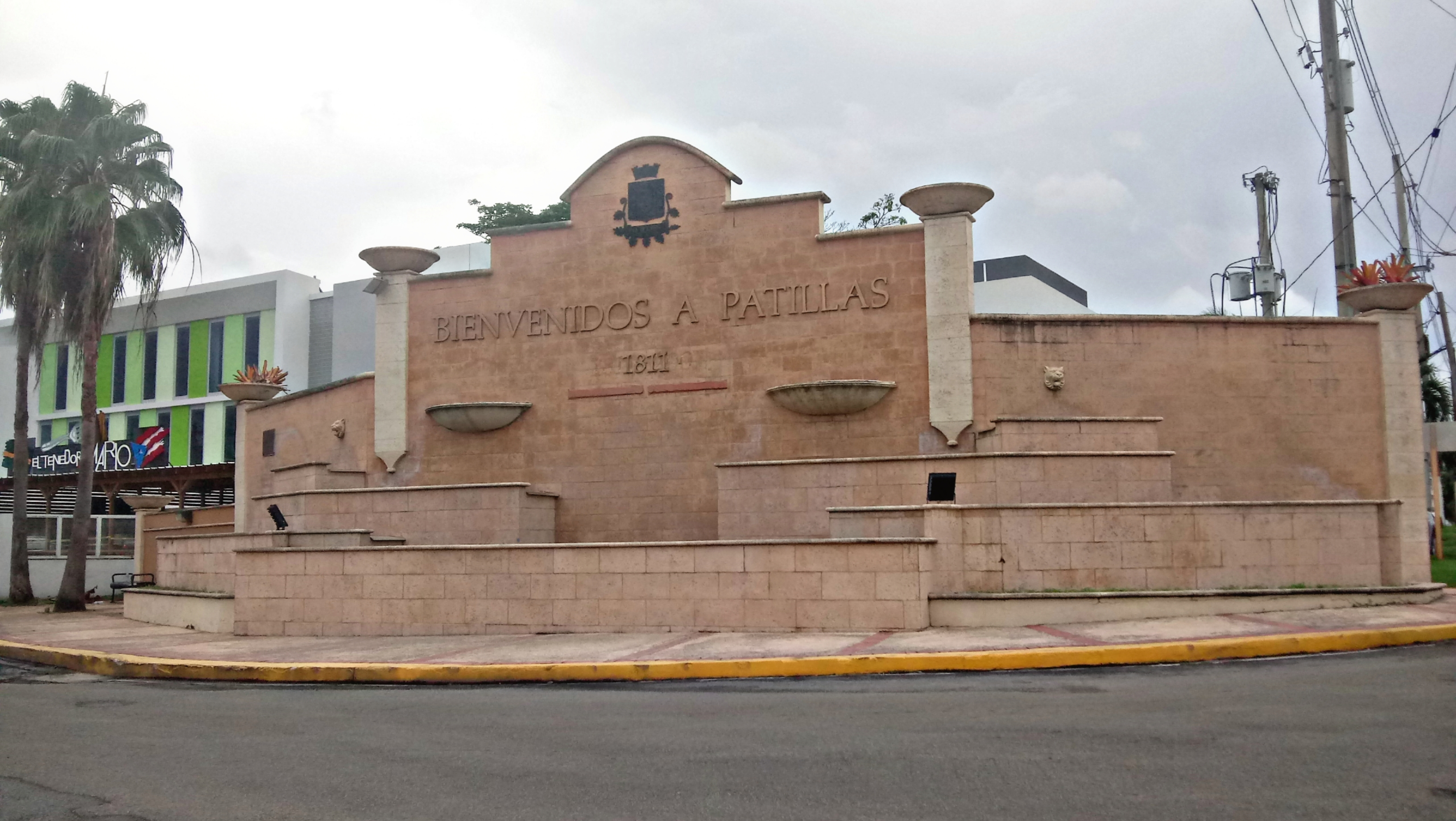
- Welcome to Patillas sign in Mamey

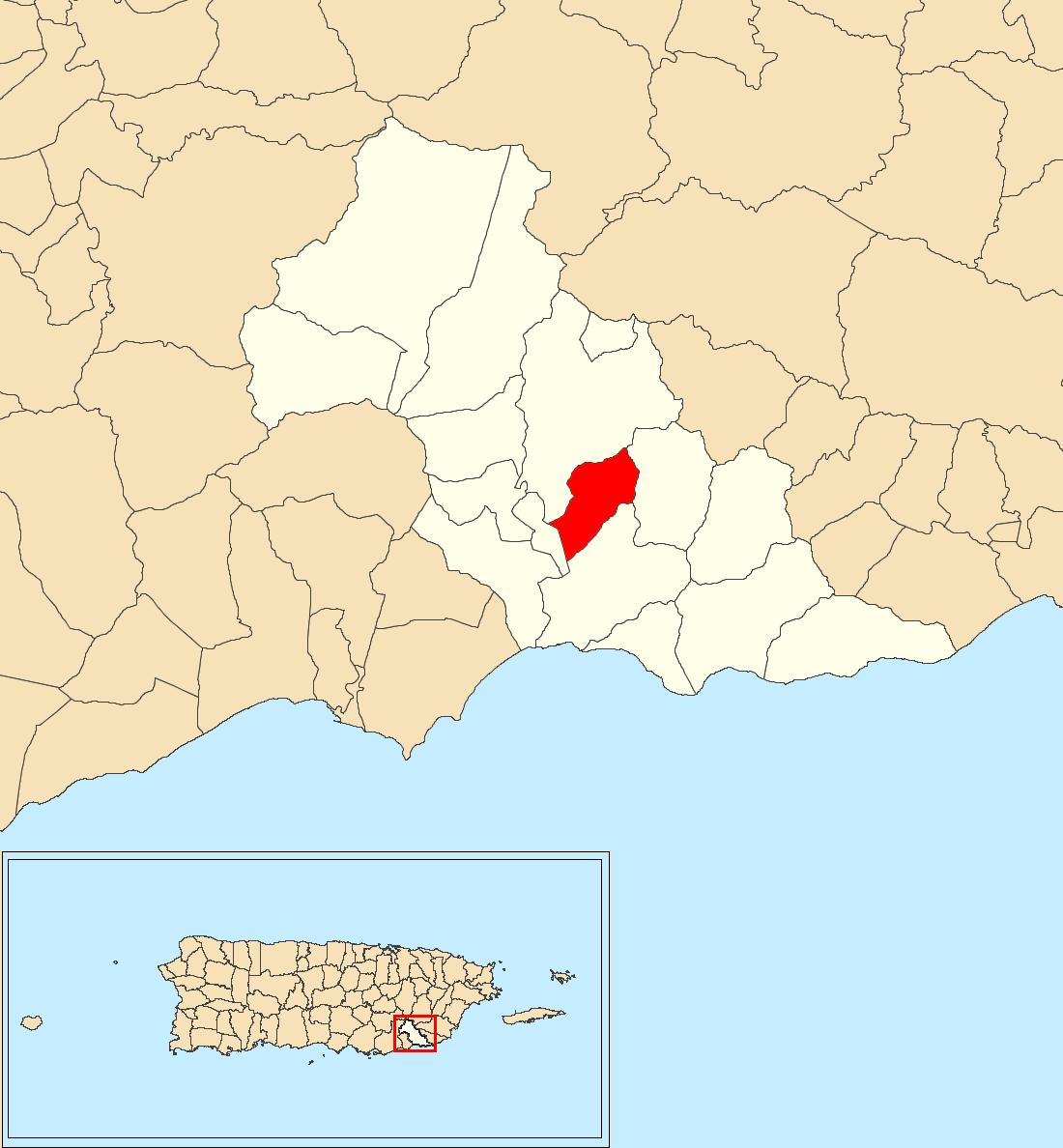
- Location of Mamey within the municipality of Patillas shown in red

- Location of Puerto Rico
- Coordinates: 18°00′57″N 66°00′06″W
- Commonwealth: Puerto Rico
- Municipality: Patillas

Area
  - Total: 1.34 sq mi (3.5 km^{2})
  - Land: 1.34 sq mi (3.5 km^{2})
  - Water: 0 sq mi (0 km^{2})
- Elevation: 538 ft (164 m)

Population (2020)
  - Total: 1,110
- Source: 2020 Census
- Time zone: UTC−4 (AST)
- ZIP Code: 00723
- Area code: 787/939

Mamey is a barrio in the municipality of Patillas, Puerto Rico. Its population in 2020 was 1,110.

== History ==
Mamey was in Spain's gazetteers until Puerto Rico was ceded by Spain in the aftermath of the Spanish–American War under the terms of the Treaty of Paris of 1898 and became an unincorporated territory of the United States. In 1899, the United States Department of War conducted a census of Puerto Rico finding that the combined population of Mamey and Apeadero barrios was 1,249.

Historical population
| Census | Pop. | Note | %± |
|---|---|---|---|
| 1910 | 810 | | — |
| 1920 | 1,013 | | 25.1% |
| 1930 | 757 | | −25.3% |
| 1940 | 949 | | 25.4% |
| 1950 | 850 | | −10.4% |
| 1960 | 678 | | −20.2% |
| 1970 | 0 | | −100.0% |
| 1980 | 1,798 | | — |
| 1990 | 2,539 | | 41.2% |
| 2000 | 2,533 | | −0.2% |
| 2010 | 1,380 | | −45.5% |
| 2020 | 1,110 | | −19.6% |
U.S. Decennial Census; 1900 (N/A) 1910-1930; 1930-1950 1980-2000 2010 2020

== Sectors ==
Barrios (which are, in contemporary times, roughly comparable to minor civil divisions) in turn are further subdivided into smaller local populated place areas/units called sectores (sectors in English). The types of sectores may vary, from normally sector to urbanización to reparto to barriada to residencial, among others.

The following sectors are in Mamey barrio:

Carretera 757, Condominios Buenos Aires, Égida Del Bosque, Sector La Cuchilla, Sector Limones, Sector Loma del Viento, Sector Río Chico, Sector Santo Domingo, Sector Vietnam, Urbanización Valle Verde, Urbanización Villa Esperanza, and Urbanización Villas de Jerusalén.

== See also ==
- List of communities in Puerto Rico
- List of barrios and sectors of Patillas, Puerto Rico
