= Patillas barrio-pueblo =

Historical and administrative center (seat) of Patillas, Puerto Rico

Patillas barrio-pueblo Pueblo de Patillas
- Municipality Seat
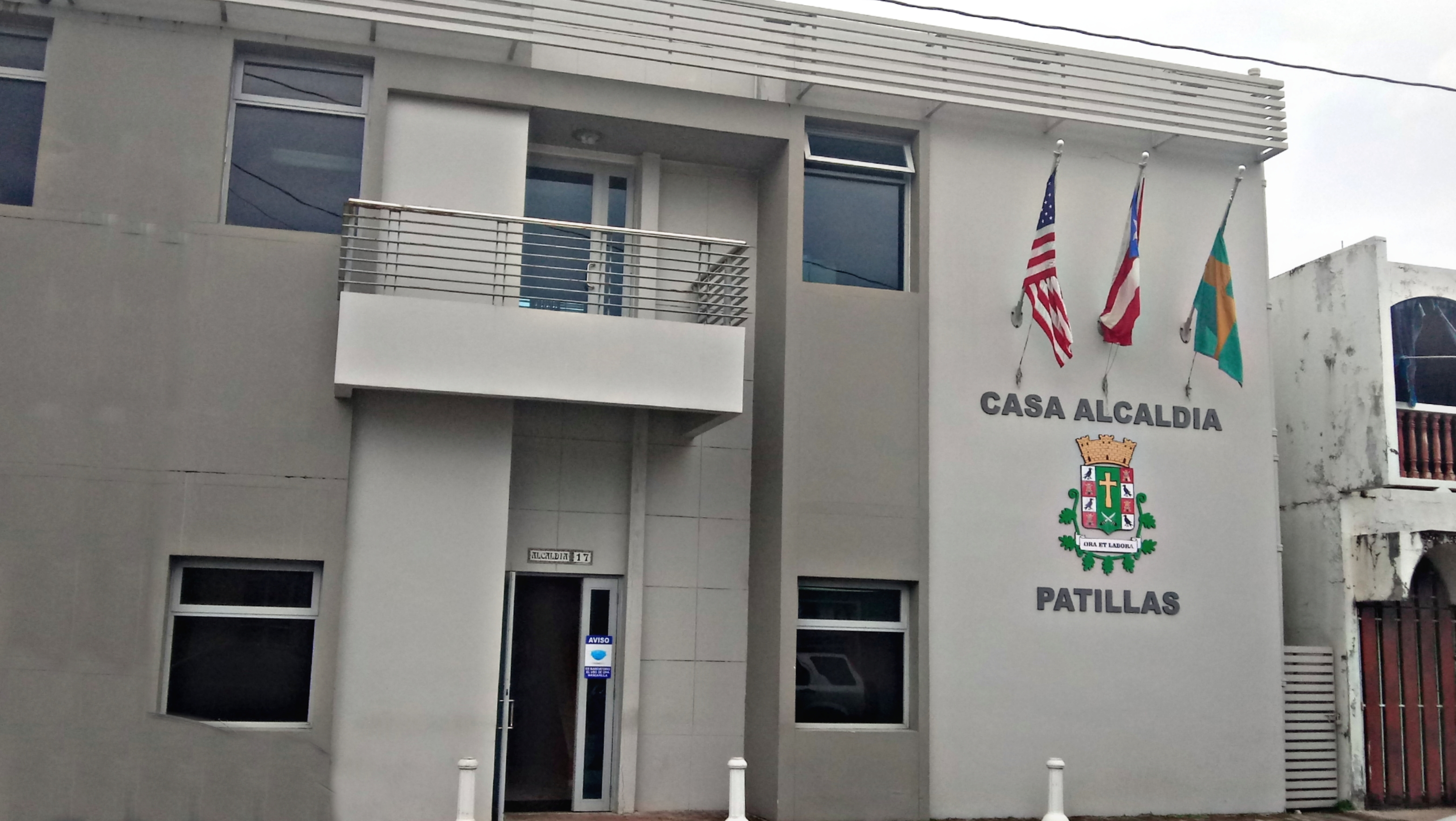
- Town Hall of Patillas

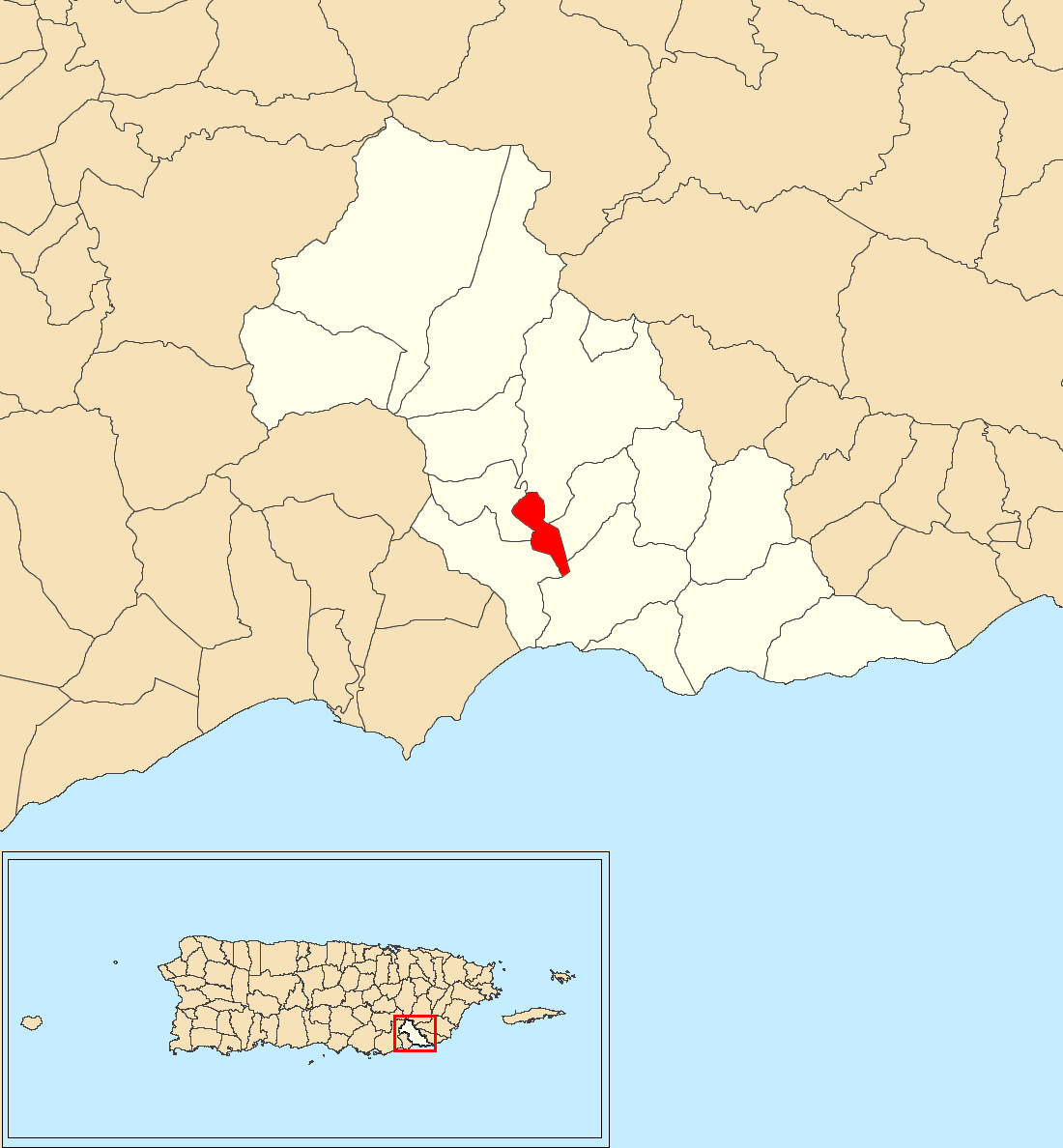
- Location of Patillas barrio-pueblo within the municipality of Patillas shown in red

- Location of Puerto Rico
- Coordinates: 18°00′33″N 66°00′52″W
- Commonwealth: Puerto Rico
- Municipality: Patillas

Area
  - Total: 0.49 sq mi (1.3 km^{2})
  - Land: 0.49 sq mi (1.3 km^{2})
  - Water: 0 sq mi (0 km^{2})
- Elevation: 82 ft (25 m)

Population (2010)
  - Total: 2,279
  - Density: 4,651/sq mi (1,796/km^{2})
- Source: 2010 Census
- Time zone: UTC−4 (AST)
- ZIP Code: 00723
- Area code: 787/939

Patillas barrio-pueblo is a barrio and the administrative center (seat) of Patillas, a municipality of Puerto Rico. Its population in 2010 was 2,279.

As was customary in Spain, in Puerto Rico, the municipality has a barrio called pueblo which contains a central plaza, the municipal buildings (city hall), and a Catholic church. Fiestas patronales (patron saint festivals) are held in the central plaza every year.

== The central plaza and its church ==
The central plaza, or square, is a place for official and unofficial recreational events and a place where people can gather and socialize from dusk to dawn. The Laws of the Indies, Spanish law, which regulated life in Puerto Rico in the early 19th century, stated the plaza's purpose was for "the parties" (celebrations, festivities) (Spanish: a propósito para las fiestas), and that the square should be proportionally large enough for the number of neighbors (Spanish: grandeza proporcionada al número de vecinos). These Spanish regulations also stated that the streets nearby should be comfortable portals for passersby, protecting them from the elements: sun and rain.

Located across the central plaza in Patillas barrio-pueblo is the Parroquia Inmaculado Corazón de María (English: Immaculate Heart of Mary Parish), a Roman Catholic church. The first church was inaugurated in 1811. Its replacement built in 1848 was destroyed by the San Felipe Segundo hurricane in 1928. Designed by Francisco Porrata Dora, the church which stands there now was constructed in the 1930s. In 1995, the church was remodeled with lateral extensions.

== History ==
Patillas barrio-pueblo was in Spain's gazetteers until Puerto Rico was ceded by Spain in the aftermath of the Spanish–American War under the terms of the Treaty of Paris of 1898 and became an unincorporated territory of the United States. In 1899, the United States Department of War conducted a census of Puerto Rico finding that the population of Pueblo was 1,590.

Historical population
Census	Pop.	Note	%±
1900	1,590		—
1910	2,228		40.1%
1920	1,693		−24.0%
1930	2,033		20.1%
1940	2,272		11.8%
1950	2,237		−1.5%
1960	1,888		−15.6%
1970	0		−100.0%
1980	1,126		—
1990	948		−15.8%
2000	701		−26.1%
2010	2,279		225.1%
U.S. Decennial Census; 1899 (shown as 1900) 1910-1930; 1930-1950 1980-2000 2010

In July 2020, Federal Emergency Management Agency appropriated funds for repairs to Patillas' plaza.

== Sectors ==
Barrios (which are, in contemporary times, roughly comparable to minor civil divisions) in turn are further subdivided into smaller local populated place areas/units called sectores (sectors in English). The types of sectores may vary, from normally sector to urbanización to reparto to barriada to residencial, among others.

The following sectors are in Patillas barrio-pueblo:

Residencial Villa del Caribe, Urbanización Jardines de Patillas, Urbanización Jardines del Mamey, Urbanización Joseira, Urbanización Mariani, Urbanización Melissa, Urbanización Parque del Sol, Urbanización San Benito, Urbanización San Martín, and Urbanización Villas de Patillas.

== See also ==
- List of communities in Puerto Rico
- List of barrios and sectors of Patillas, Puerto Rico
