= Guardarraya =

Barrio of Patillas, Puerto Rico

- Barrio
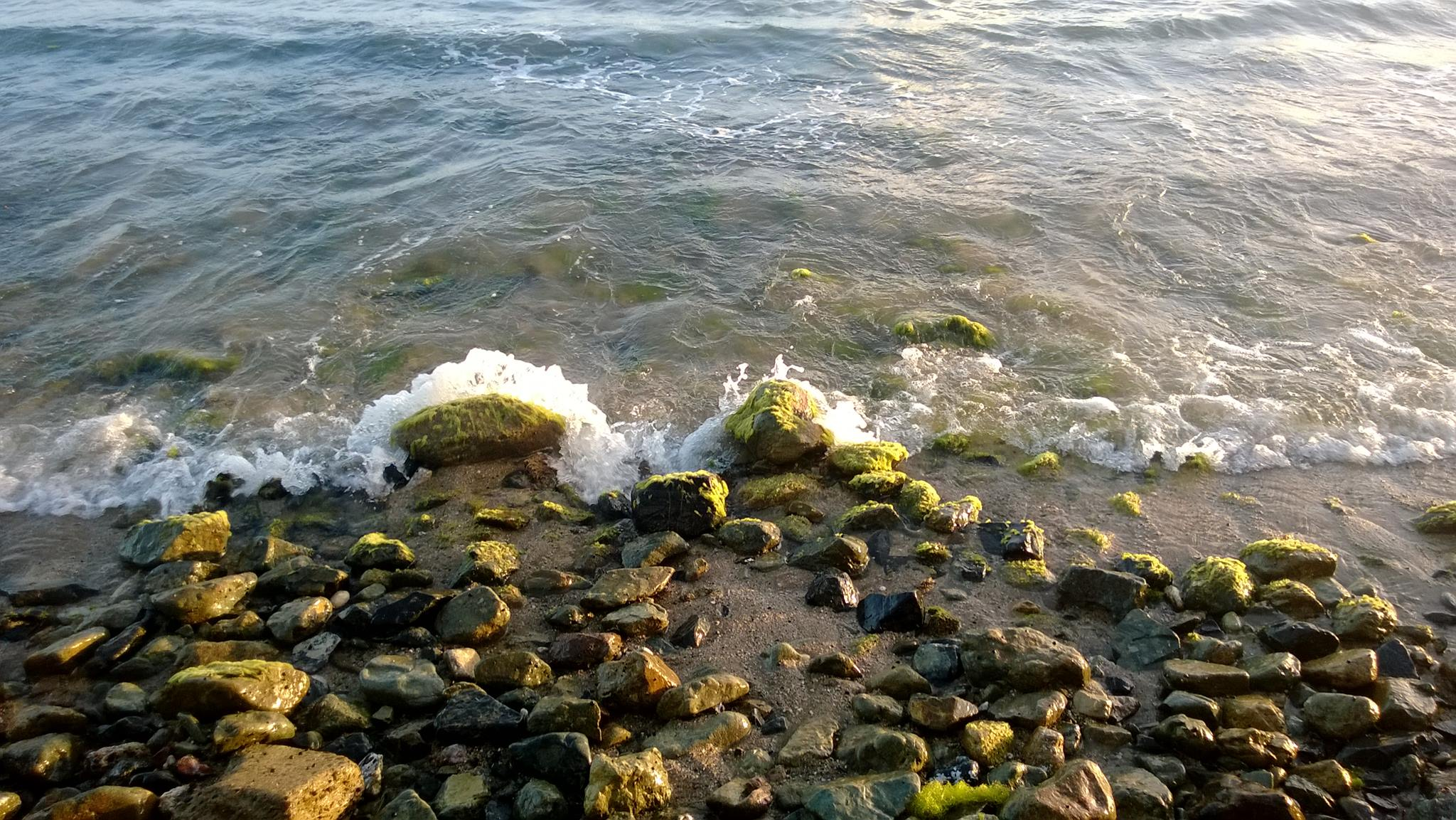
- Guardarraya Beach

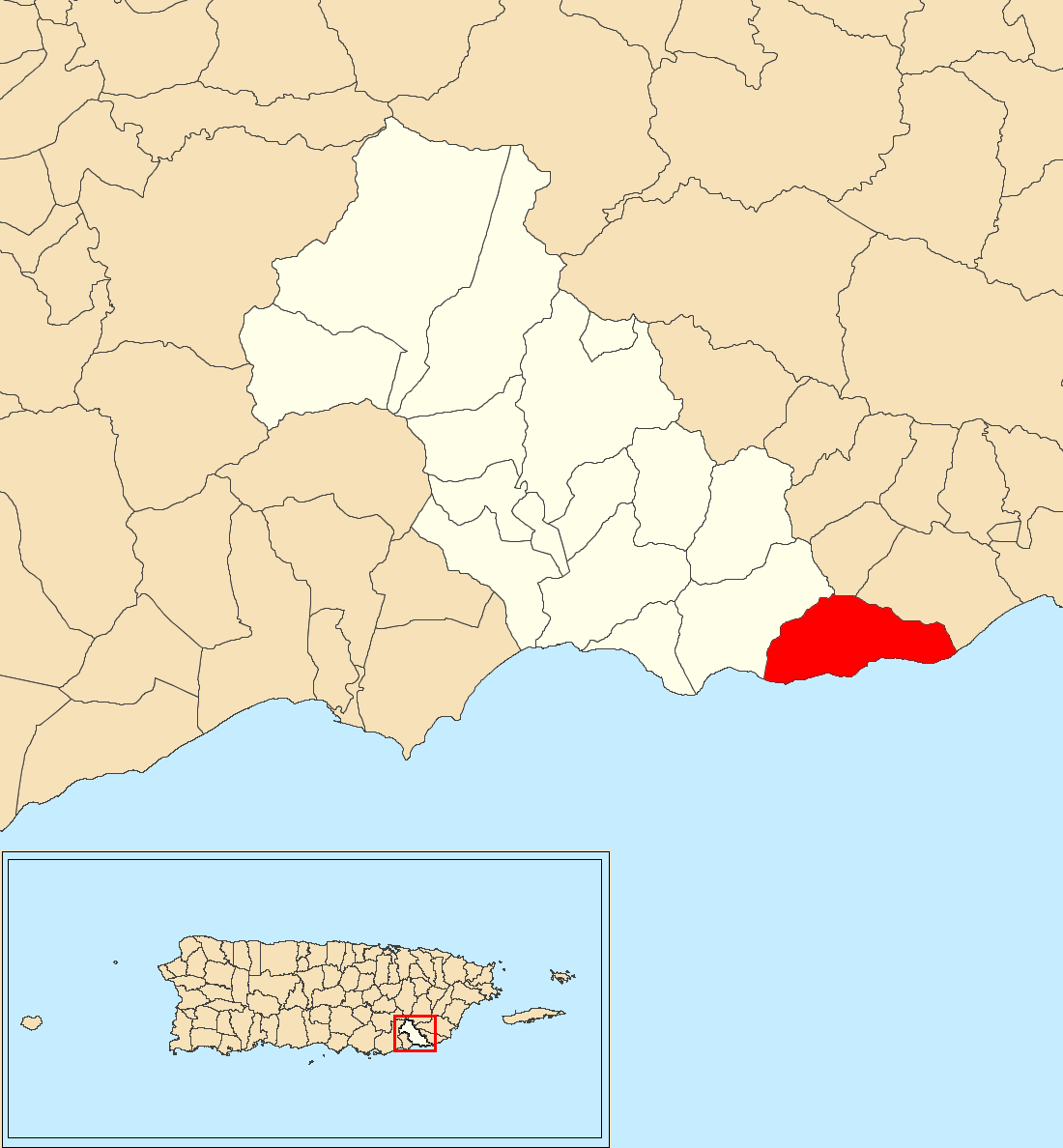
- Location of Guardarraya within the municipality of Patillas shown in red

- Location of Puerto Rico
- Coordinates: 17°58′28″N 65°56′09″W
- Commonwealth: Puerto Rico
- Municipality: Patillas

Area
  - Total: 5.94 sq mi (15.4 km^{2})
  - Land: 2.92 sq mi (7.6 km^{2})
  - Water: 3.02 sq mi (7.8 km^{2})
- Elevation: 10 ft (3.0 m)

Population (2010)
  - Total: 1,603
  - Density: 530.8/sq mi (204.9/km^{2})
- Source: 2010 Census
- Time zone: UTC−4 (AST)
- ZIP Code: 00723
- Area code: 787/939

Guardarraya is a barrio in the municipality of Patillas, Puerto Rico. Its population in 2010 was 1,603.

== History ==
Guardarraya, located where the Cordillera Central mountains meet the Caribbean Sea, in 1765 was known for its agriculture, fishing and production of aromatic oils. Guardarraya is where the legendary pirate Roberto Cofresí was captured and turned over to authorities.

Guardarraya was in Spain's gazetteers until Puerto Rico was ceded by Spain in the aftermath of the Spanish–American War under the terms of the Treaty of Paris of 1898 and became an unincorporated territory of the United States. In 1899, the United States Department of War conducted a census of Puerto Rico finding that the population of Guardarraya barrio was 1,013.

Historical population
Census	Pop.	Note	%±
1900	1,013		—
1910	1,190		17.5%
1920	1,204		1.2%
1930	1,564		29.9%
1940	1,541		−1.5%
1950	1,592		3.3%
1960	1,665		4.6%
1970	1,660		−0.3%
1980	1,709		3.0%
1990	2,202		28.8%
2000	2,013		−8.6%
2010	1,603		−20.4%
U.S. Decennial Census; 1899 (shown as 1900) 1910-1930; 1930-1950 1980-2000 2010

== Sectors ==
Barrios (which are, in contemporary times, roughly comparable to minor civil divisions) in turn are further subdivided into smaller local populated place areas/units called sectores (sectors in English). The types of sectores may vary, from normally sector to urbanización to reparto to barriada to residencial, among others.

The following sectors are in Guardarraya barrio:

Calle Buena Vista, Calle Ceiba, Calle Monte Mar, Calle Monte, Calle Vista Alegre, Calle Vista Horizonte, Calle Vista Mar, Calle Vista Monte, Carretera 3, Carretera 7758, Centro Cooperativo, Comunidad Guardarraya, Sector Cofresí, Sector La Mina, Sector Mala Pascua, Sector Recio, Sector San Bartolo, and Sector Tamarindo.

== See also ==
- List of communities in Puerto Rico
- List of barrios and sectors of Patillas, Puerto Rico
