= Egozcue =

Barrio of Patillas, Puerto Rico

- Barrio
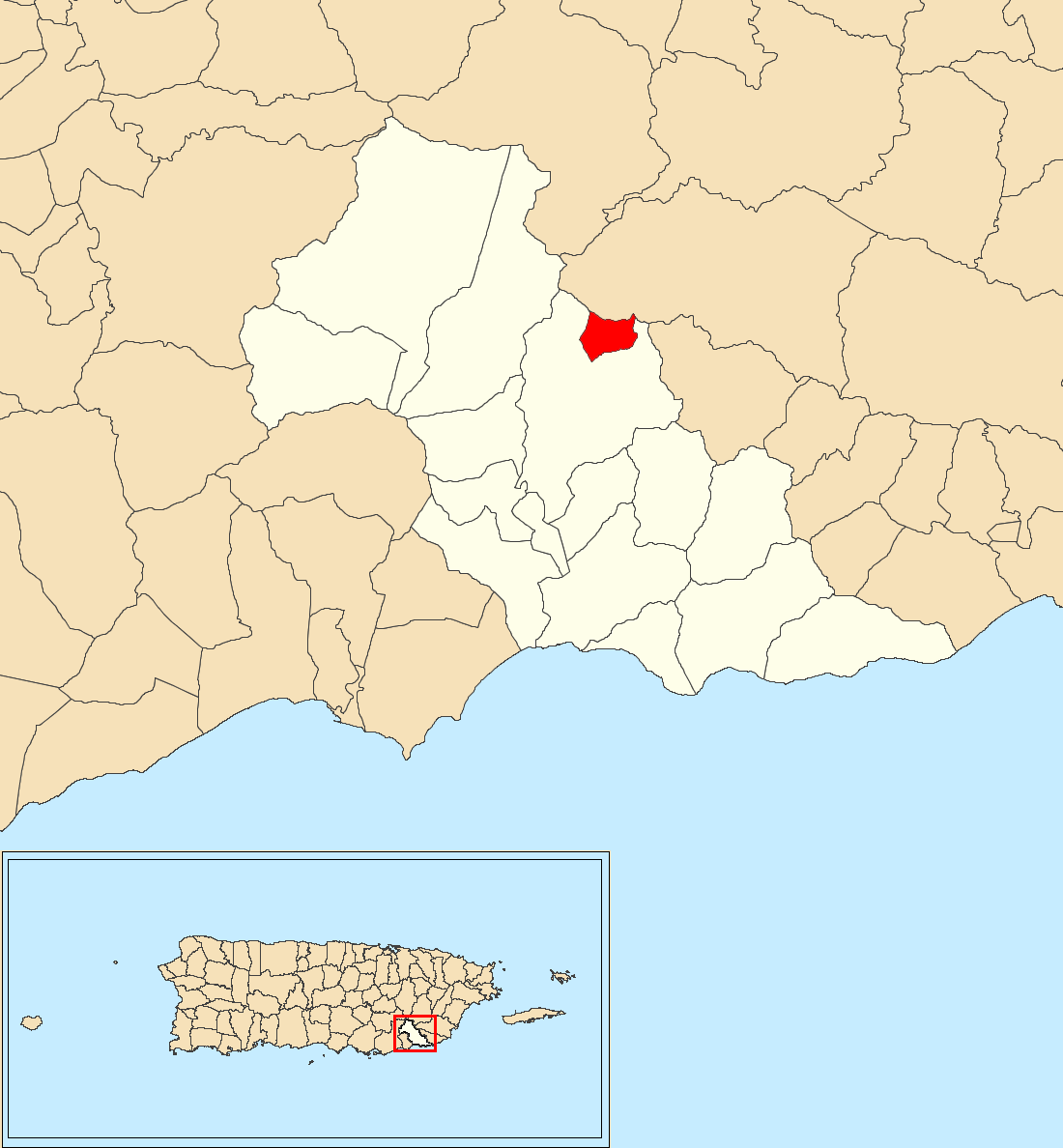
- Location of Egozcue within the municipality of Patillas shown in red

- Location of Puerto Rico
- Coordinates: 18°03′22″N 65°59′55″W
- Commonwealth: Puerto Rico
- Municipality: Patillas

Area
  - Total: 0.48 sq mi (1.2 km^{2})
  - Land: 0.48 sq mi (1.2 km^{2})
  - Water: 0 sq mi (0 km^{2})
- Elevation: 1,450 ft (440 m)

Population (2010)
  - Total: 52
  - Density: 108.3/sq mi (41.8/km^{2})
- Source: 2010 Census
- Time zone: UTC−4 (AST)
- ZIP Code: 00723
- Area code: 787/939

Egozcue is a barrio in the municipality of Patillas, Puerto Rico. Its population in 2010 was 52.

Historical population
Census	Pop.	Note	%±
1910	229		—
1920	323		41.0%
1930	234		−27.6%
1940	277		18.4%
1950	105		−62.1%
1960	110		4.8%
1970	80		−27.3%
1980	141		76.3%
1990	81		−42.6%
2000	52		−35.8%
2010	52		0.0%
U.S. Decennial Census; 1900 (N/A) 1910-1930; 1930-1950 1980-2000 2010

== Sectors ==
Barrios (which are, in contemporary times, roughly comparable to minor civil divisions) in turn are further subdivided into smaller local populated place areas/units called sectores (sectors in English). The types of sectores may vary, from normally sector to urbanización to reparto to barriada to residencial, among others.

The following sectors are in Egozcue barrio:

Carretera 181, Carretera 7759, Sector Betancourt, Sector Calanse, Sector Campusu, Sector Cuatro Calles, Sector El Coquí, Sector Guaraguao, Sector Huertas, and Sector Pedragón.

== See also ==
- List of communities in Puerto Rico
- List of barrios and sectors of Patillas, Puerto Rico
