= Roncador, Utuado, Puerto Rico =

Barrio of Puerto Rico

Roncador
- Barrio
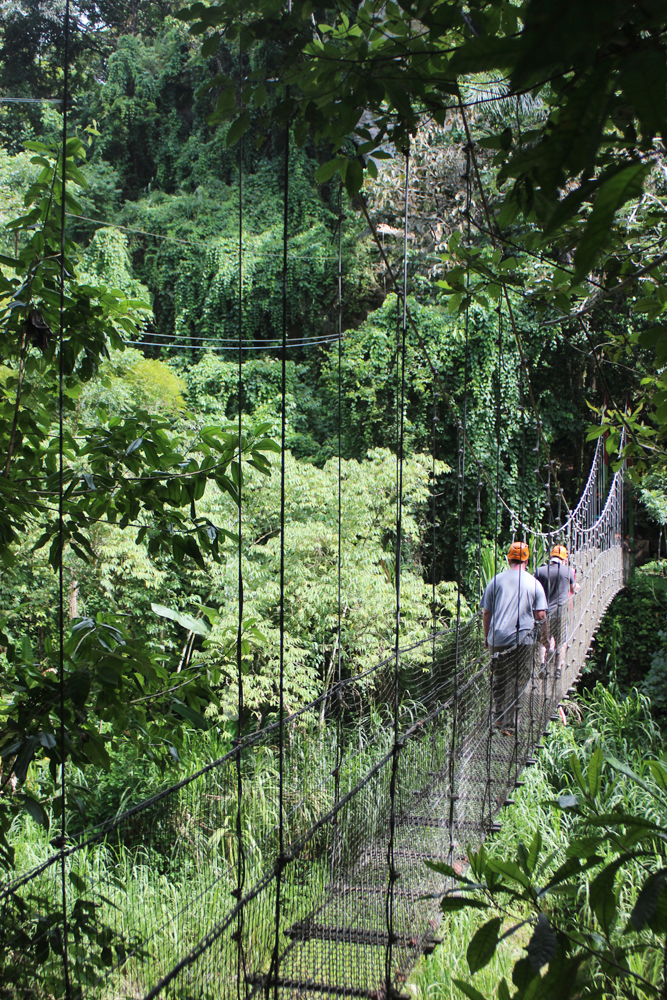
- Bridge over Tanamá River in Roncador

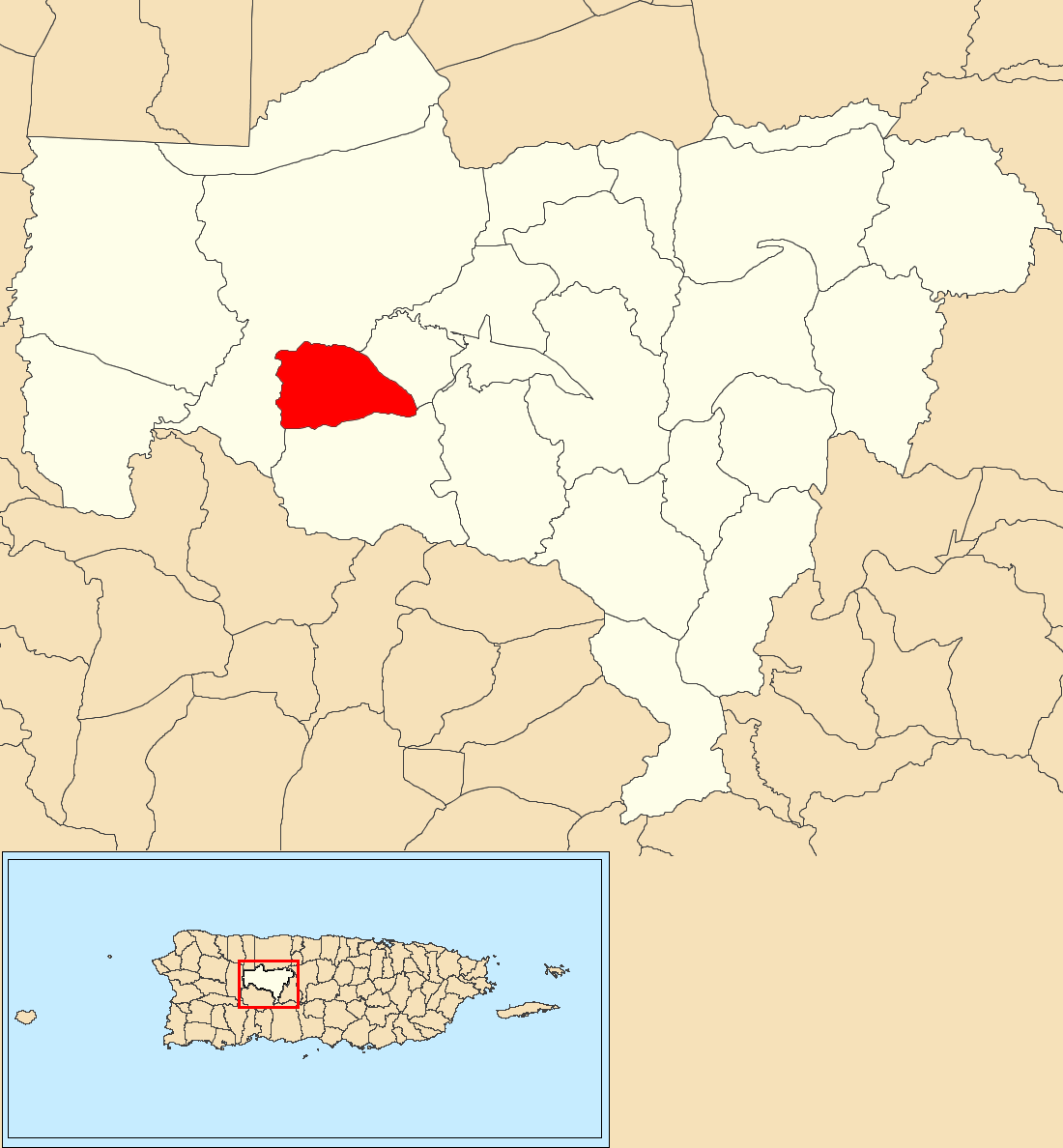
- Location of Roncador within the municipality of Utuado shown in red

- Location of Puerto Rico
- Coordinates: 18°15′37″N 66°44′55″W
- Commonwealth: Puerto Rico
- Municipality: Utuado

Area
  - Total: 2.39 sq mi (6.2 km^{2})
  - Land: 2.39 sq mi (6.2 km^{2})
  - Water: 0 sq mi (0 km^{2})
- Elevation: 1,230 ft (370 m)

Population (2010)
  - Total: 637
  - Density: 266.5/sq mi (102.9/km^{2})
- Source: 2010 Census
- Time zone: UTC−4 (AST)

Roncador is a barrio in the municipality of Utuado, Puerto Rico. Its population in 2010 was 637.

== History ==
Roncador was in Spain's gazetteers until Puerto Rico was ceded by Spain in the aftermath of the Spanish–American War under the terms of the Treaty of Paris of 1898 and became an unincorporated territory of the United States. In 1899, the United States Department of War conducted a census of Puerto Rico finding that the population of Roncador barrio was 1,130.

Historical population
Census	Pop.	Note	%±
1900	1,130		—
1910	970		−14.2%
1920	1,097		13.1%
1930	1,034		−5.7%
1940	1,130		9.3%
1950	854		−24.4%
1960	664		−22.2%
1970	460		−30.7%
1980	459		−0.2%
1990	488		6.3%
2000	579		18.6%
2010	637		10.0%
U.S. Decennial Census; 1899 (shown as 1900) 1910-1930; 1930-1950 1980-2000 2010

== Gallery ==
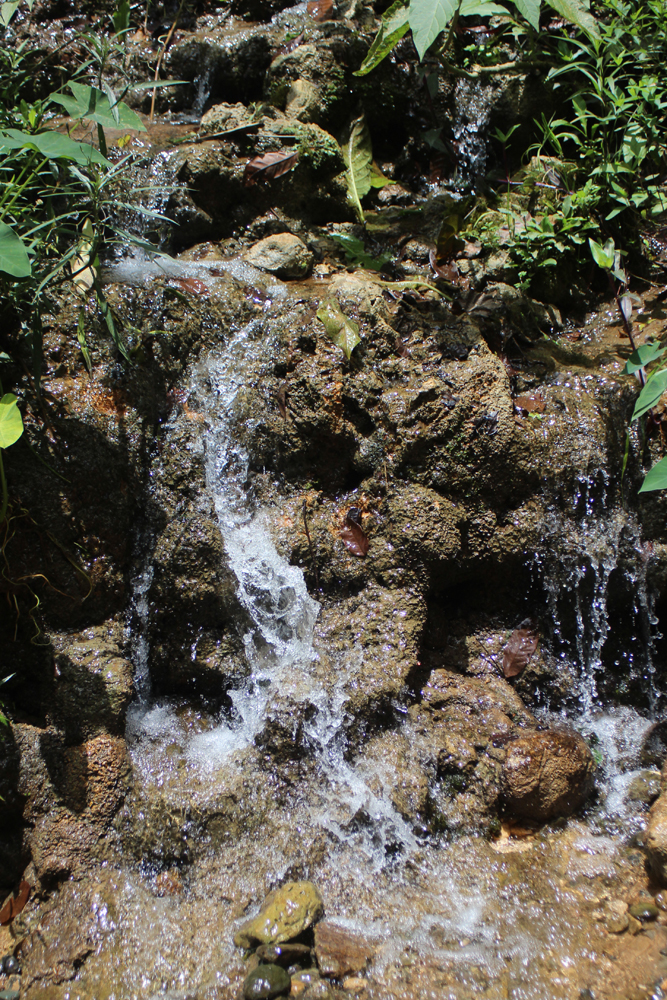
Spring water in Roncador

== See also ==
- List of communities in Puerto Rico
