= Jagual, Patillas, Puerto Rico =

Barrio of Puerto Rico

Jagual
- Barrio
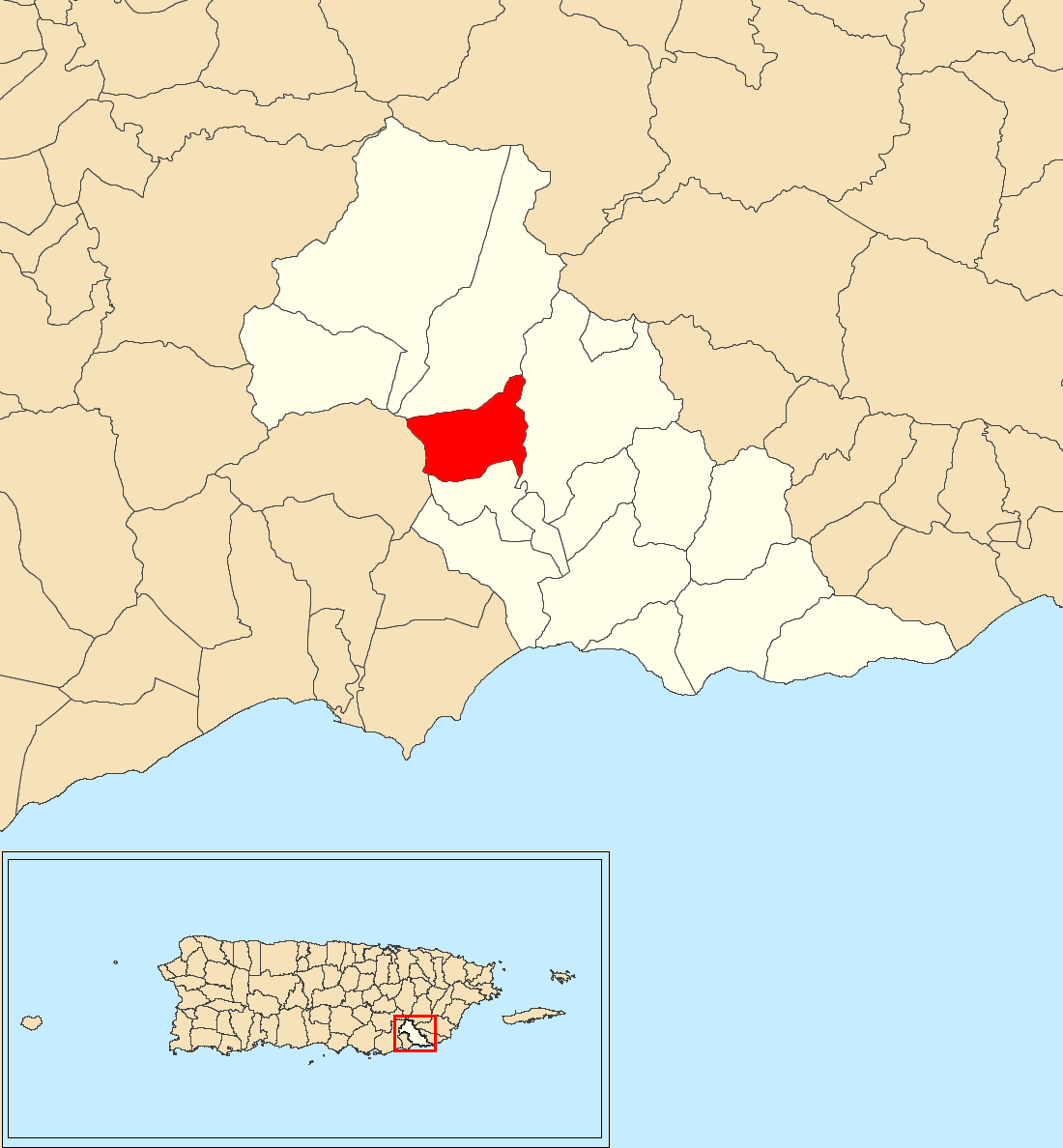
- Location of Jagual within the municipality of Patillas shown in red

- Location of Puerto Rico
- Coordinates: 18°01′52″N 66°01′50″W
- Commonwealth: Puerto Rico
- Municipality: Patillas

Area
  - Total: 2.04 sq mi (5.3 km^{2})
  - Land: 1.86 sq mi (4.8 km^{2})
  - Water: 0.18 sq mi (0.47 km^{2})
- Elevation: 223 ft (68 m)

Population (2010)
  - Total: 363
  - Density: 195.2/sq mi (75.4/km^{2})
- Source: 2010 Census
- Time zone: UTC−4 (AST)
- ZIP Code: 00723
- Area code: 787/939

Jagual is a barrio in the municipality of Patillas, Puerto Rico. Its population in 2010 was 363.

== History ==
Jagual was in Spain's gazetteers until Puerto Rico was ceded by Spain in the aftermath of the Spanish–American War under the terms of the Treaty of Paris of 1898 and became an unincorporated territory of the United States. In 1899, the United States Department of War conducted a census of Puerto Rico finding that the combined population of Jagual and Cacao Alto barrios was 1,018.

Historical population
Census	Pop.	Note	%±
1910	1,324		—
1920	725		−45.2%
1930	657		−9.4%
1940	703		7.0%
1950	711		1.1%
1960	536		−24.6%
1970	501		−6.5%
1980	349		−30.3%
1990	474		35.8%
2000	498		5.1%
2010	363		−27.1%
U.S. Decennial Census; 1900 (N/A) 1910-1930; 1930-1950 1980-2000 2010

== Sectors ==
Barrios (which are, in contemporary times, roughly comparable to minor civil divisions) in turn are further subdivided into smaller local populated place areas/units called sectores (sectors in English). The types of sectores may vary, from normally sector to urbanización to reparto to barriada to residencial, among others.

The following sectors are in Jagual barrio:

Carretera 184, Sector Caimito, Sector Charco La Huerta, Sector El Conejo Blanco, Sector La Cuesta del Cuco, Sector La Luna, Sector La Playita, Sector La Prá, Sector Lebrón, Sector Puerca Prieta, Sector Represa, Sector Suro, and Sector Vietnam.

== See also ==
- List of communities in Puerto Rico
- List of barrios and sectors of Patillas, Puerto Rico
