= Ríos, Patillas, Puerto Rico =

Barrio of Puerto Rico

Ríos
- Barrio
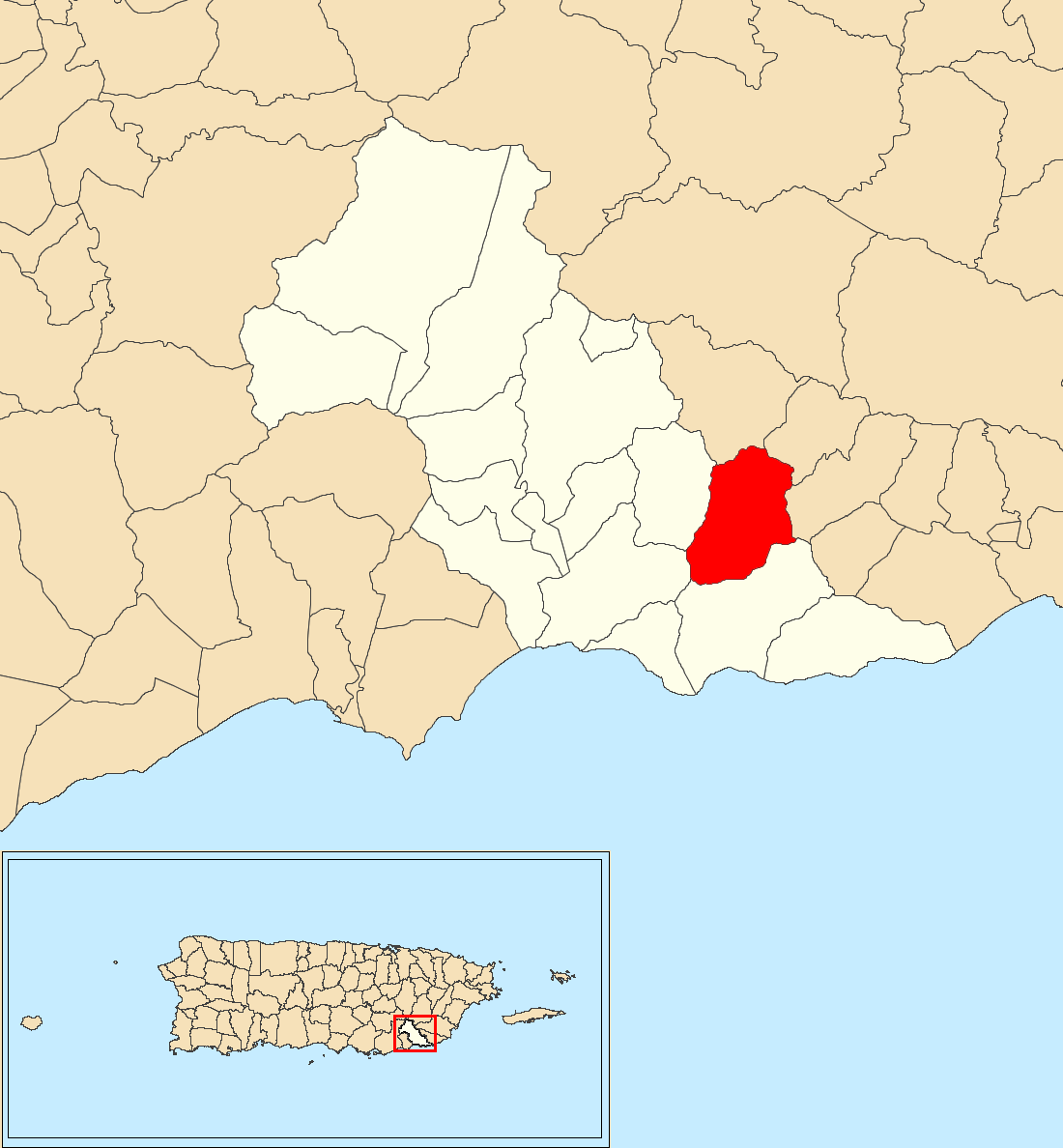
- Location of Ríos within the municipality of Patillas shown in red

- Location of Puerto Rico
- Coordinates: 18°00′41″N 65°57′56″W
- Commonwealth: Puerto Rico
- Municipality: Patillas

Area
  - Total: 2.7 sq mi (7.0 km^{2})
  - Land: 2.7 sq mi (7.0 km^{2})
  - Water: 0 sq mi (0 km^{2})
- Elevation: 577 ft (176 m)

Population (2010)
  - Total: 348
  - Density: 128.9/sq mi (49.8/km^{2})
- Source: 2010 Census
- Time zone: UTC−4 (AST)
- ZIP Code: 00723
- Area code: 787/939

Ríos is a barrio in the municipality of Patillas, Puerto Rico. Its population in 2010 was 348.

== History ==
Ríos was in Spain's gazetteers until Puerto Rico was ceded by Spain in the aftermath of the Spanish–American War under the terms of the Treaty of Paris of 1898 and became an unincorporated territory of the United States. In 1899, the United States Department of War conducted a census of Puerto Rico finding that the combined population of Los Ríos and Pollos barrios was 1,075.

Historical population
Census	Pop.	Note	%±
1910	666		—
1920	725		8.9%
1930	693		−4.4%
1940	801		15.6%
1950	873		9.0%
1960	681		−22.0%
1970	696		2.2%
1980	493		−29.2%
1990	440		−10.8%
2000	488		10.9%
2010	348		−28.7%
U.S. Decennial Census; 1900 (N/A) 1910-1930; 1930-1950 1980-2000 2010

== Sectors ==
Barrios (which are, in contemporary times, roughly comparable to minor civil divisions) in turn are further subdivided into smaller local populated place areas/units called sectores (sectors in English). The types of sectores may vary, from normally sector to urbanización to reparto to barriada to residencial, among others.

The following sectors are in Los Ríos barrio:

Carretera 184, Carretera 758, Carretera 762, Sector Avispas, Sector Fondo del Saco, Sector Las Parcelas, Sector Los Cafeítos, Sector Los Morales, and Sector Los Ríos.

== See also ==
- List of communities in Puerto Rico
- List of barrios and sectors of Patillas, Puerto Rico
