= El Vedado (Hato Rey) =

Coordinates: 18.4181042°N 66.0605770°W

- Subbarrio
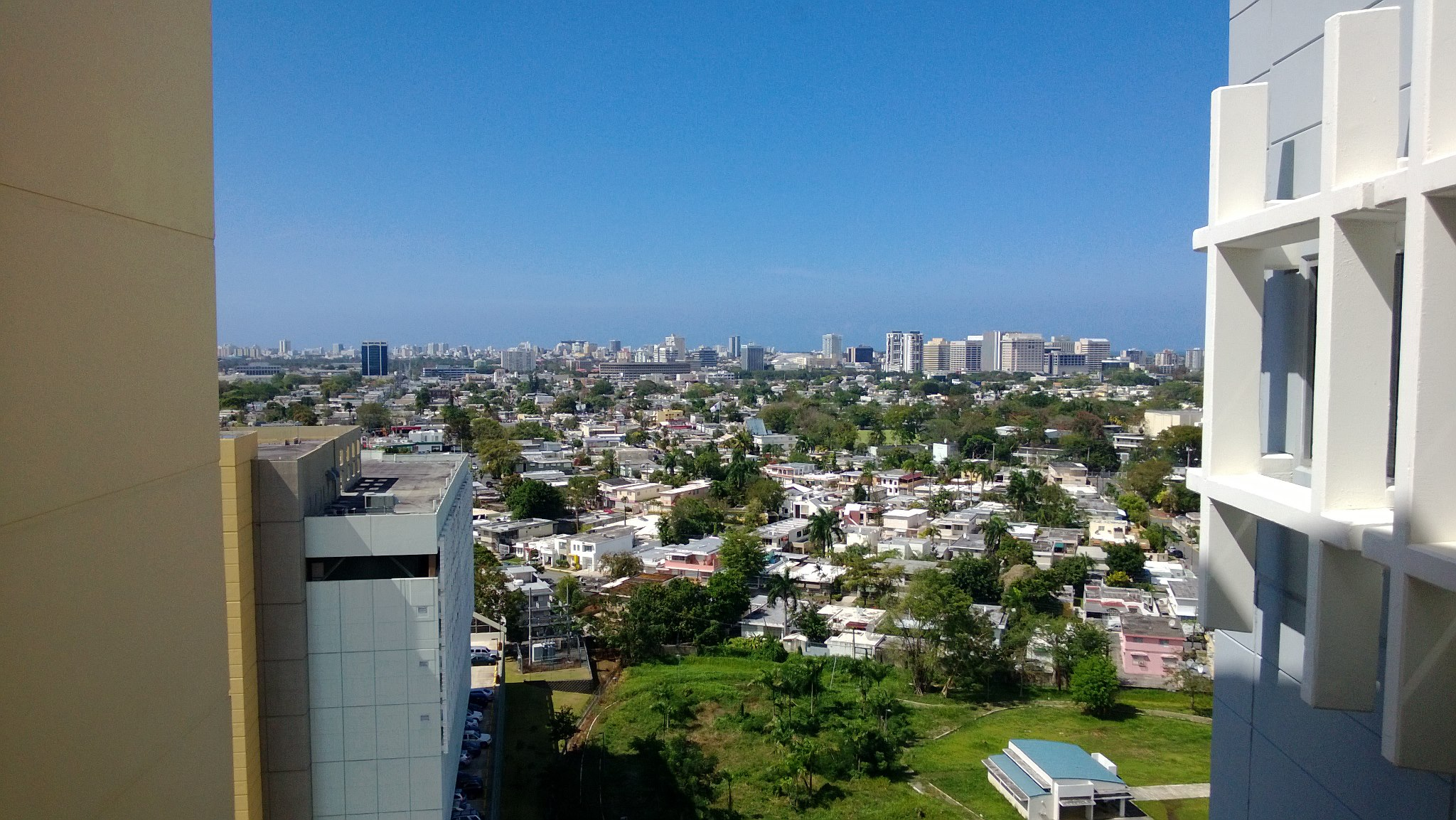
- View of El Vedado
- Interactive map of El Vedado
- Commonwealth: Puerto Rico
- Municipality: San Juan

Government
  - Type: Borough of San Juan

Population
  - Total: 3,063
- Source: 2000 United States census

El Vedado is one of the 12 sectors of Hato Rey.
