= Pollos, Patillas, Puerto Rico =

Barrio of Puerto Rico

Pollos
- Barrio
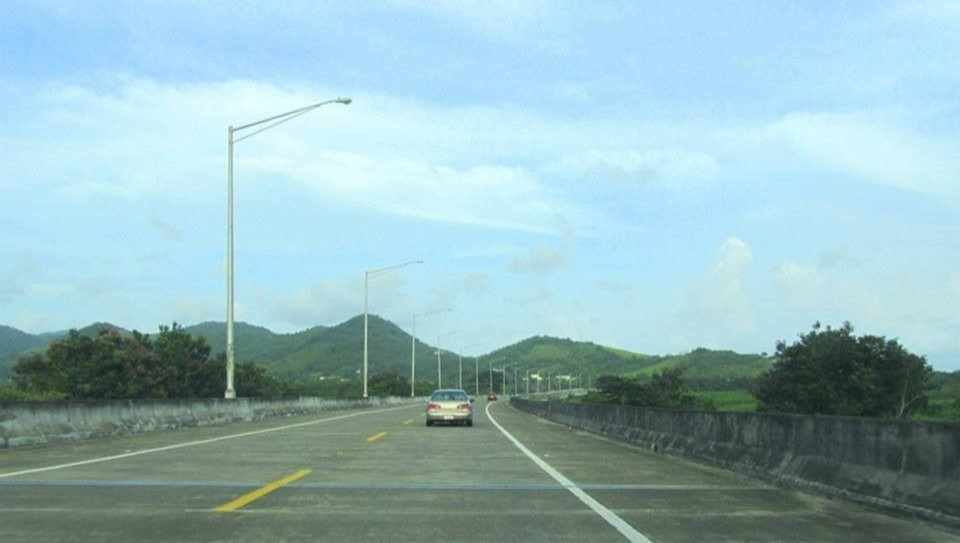
- Puerto Rico Highway 53 in Pollos

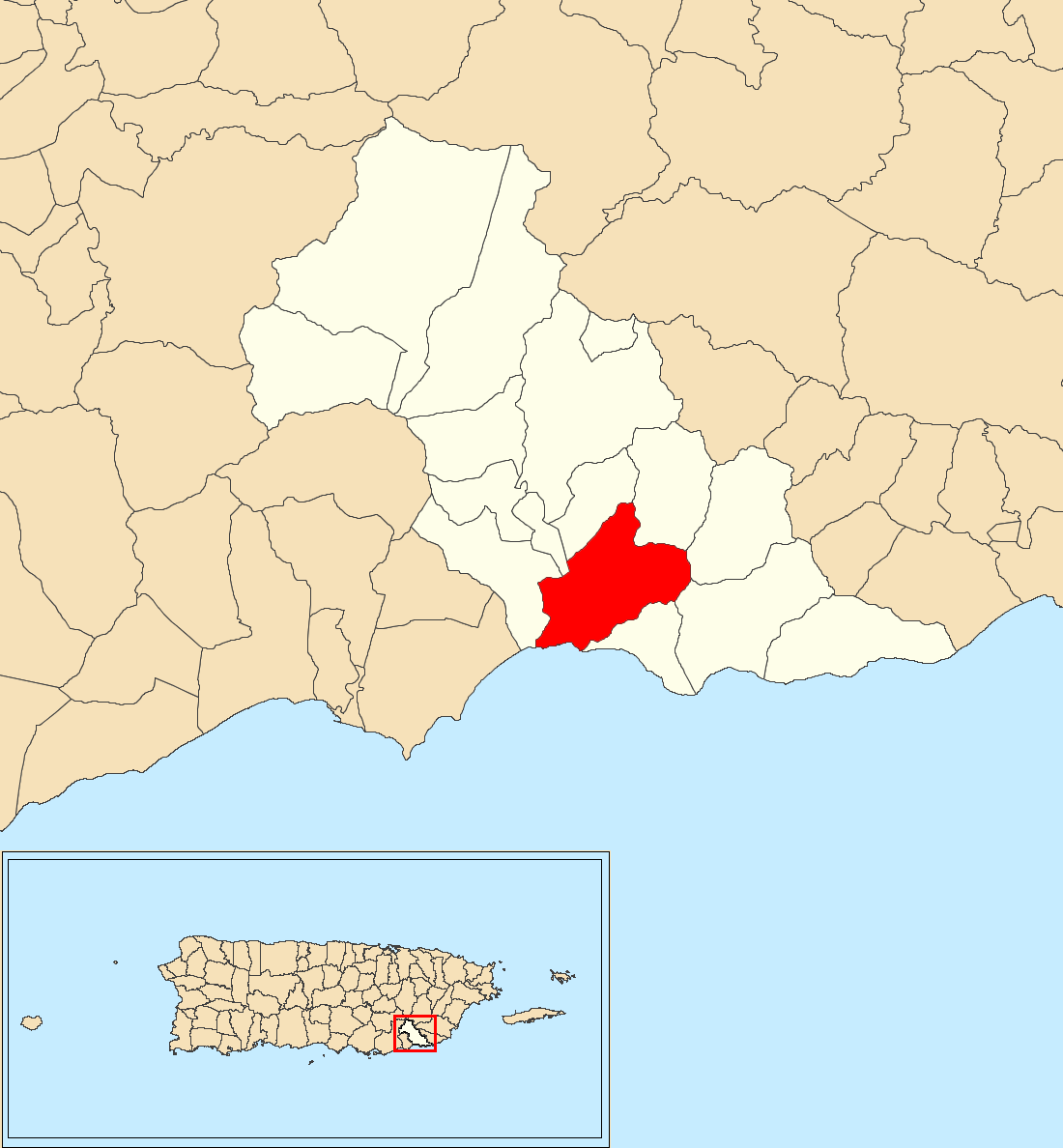
- Location of Pollos within the municipality of Patillas shown in red

- Location of Puerto Rico
- Coordinates: 17°59′43″N 65°59′47″W
- Commonwealth: Puerto Rico
- Municipality: Patillas

Area
  - Total: 3.84 sq mi (9.9 km^{2})
  - Land: 3.26 sq mi (8.4 km^{2})
  - Water: 0.58 sq mi (1.5 km^{2})
- Elevation: 85 ft (26 m)

Population (2010)
  - Total: 3,146
  - Density: 965/sq mi (373/km^{2})
- Source: 2010 Census
- Time zone: UTC−4 (AST)
- ZIP Code: 00723
- Area code: 787/939

Pollos is a barrio in the municipality of Patillas, Puerto Rico. Its population in 2010 was 3,146.

== History ==
Pollos was in Spain's gazetteers until Puerto Rico was ceded by Spain in the aftermath of the Spanish–American War under the terms of the Treaty of Paris of 1898 and became an unincorporated territory of the United States. In 1899, the United States Department of War conducted a census of Puerto Rico finding that the combined population of Ríos and Pollos barrios was 1,075.

Historical population
Census	Pop.	Note	%±
1910	767		—
1920	998		30.1%
1930	776		−22.2%
1940	1,318		69.8%
1950	1,437		9.0%
1960	1,311		−8.8%
1970	0		−100.0%
1980	2,320		—
1990	2,525		8.8%
2000	3,409		35.0%
2010	3,146		−7.7%
U.S. Decennial Census; 1900 (N/A) 1910-1930; 1930-1950 1980-2000 2010

== Sectors ==
Barrios (which are, in contemporary times, roughly comparable to minor civil divisions) in turn are further subdivided into smaller local populated place areas/units called sectores (sectors in English). The types of sectores may vary, from normally sector to urbanización to reparto to barriada to residencial, among others.

The following sectors are in Pollos barrio:

Calle Acueducto, Calle Alberto Ricci, Calle Canario, Calle Cerezos, Calle Cristo, Calle Culto, Calle El Hoyo, Calle Félix Portugués, Calle Flamboyán, Calle Francisco Ortiz Lebrón, Calle Guillermo Riefkhol, Calle Helechos, Calle Iglesia, Calle Jesús T. Piñero, Calle Las Flores, Calle Las Rosas, Calle Luna, Calle Margarita, Calle Muñoz Rivera, Calle Octavio Rivera, Calle Recreo, Calle Reymundo Fernández, Calle Robles, Calle Salsipuedes, Calle Santiago Iglesias, Calle Tamarindo, Calle Yarino, Carretera 3, Carretera 757, Carretera 7757, Parcelas Nuevas, Parcelas Viejas (Calles 1, 2, 3, 4), Sector Caguitas, Sector La Ceiba, Sector La Luna, Sector La Plo, Sector Mariani, Sector Providencia, Sector Pueblito Nuevo, Sector Tres Puertas, Urbanización Montecielo, and Urbanización Valle de la Providencia.

== See also ==
- List of communities in Puerto Rico
- List of barrios and sectors of Patillas, Puerto Rico
