= Patillas, Puerto Rico =

Town and municipality in Puerto Rico

Patillas Municipio Autónomo de Patillas
- Town and Municipality
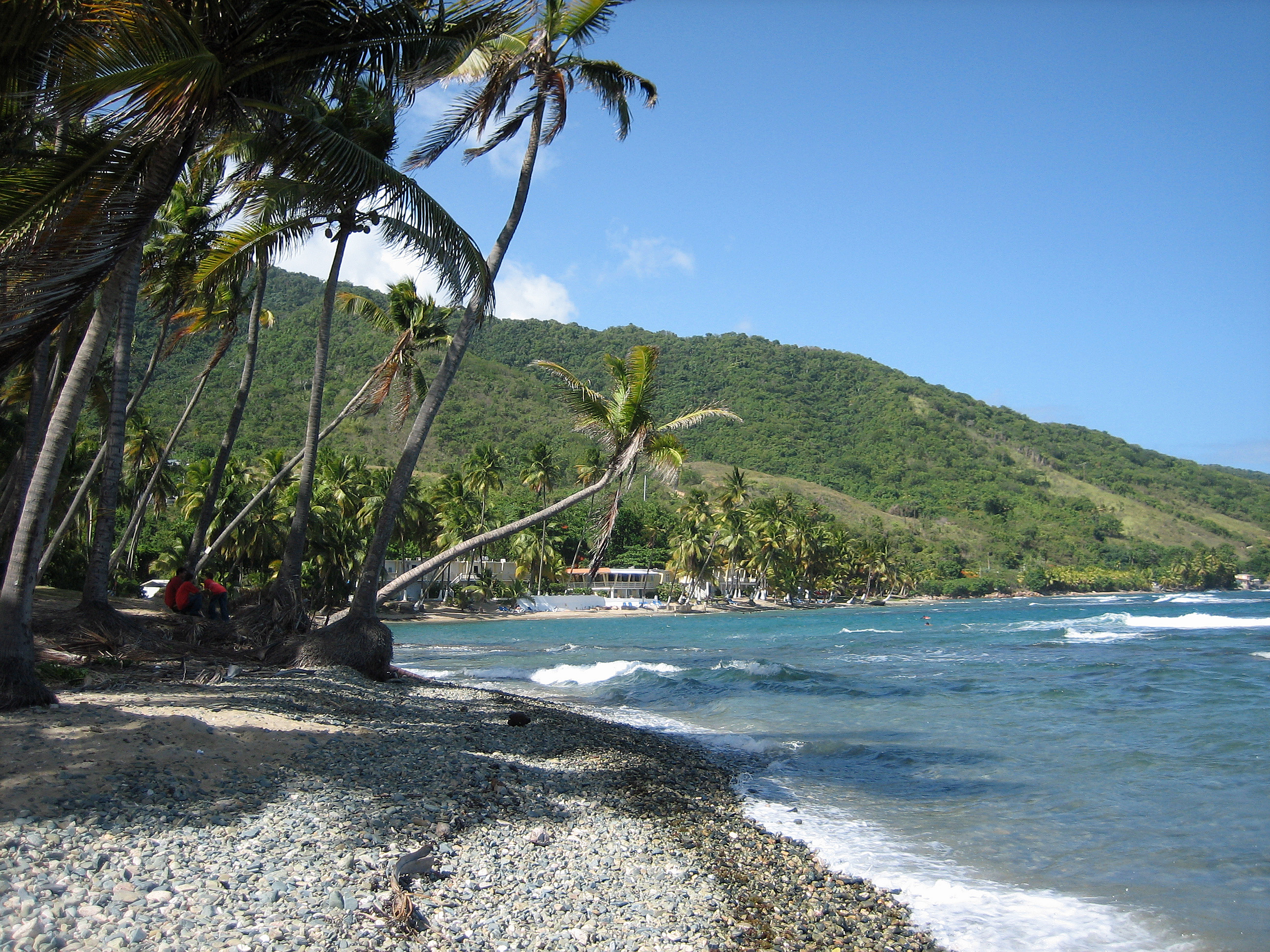
- Beach in Patillas

- Flag Coat of arms
- Nicknames: "La Esmeralda del Sur", "Los Leones"
- Anthem: "Patillenses"
- Map of Puerto Rico highlighting Patillas Municipality
- Coordinates: 18°00′23″N 66°00′57″W
- Sovereign state: United States
- Commonwealth: Puerto Rico
- Settled: 1760
- Founded: October 31, 1811
- Founder: Adelina Cintrón
- Barrios: 16 barrios: Apeadero; Bajo; Cacao Alto; Cacao Bajo; Egozcue; Guardarraya; Jacaboa; Jagual; Mamey; Marín; Mulas; Muñoz Rivera; Patillas barrio-pueblo; Pollos; Quebrada Arriba; Ríos

Government
  - Mayor: Maritza Sánchez Neris (PNP)
  - Senatorial dist.: 7 - Humacao
  - Representative dist.: 34

Area
  - Total: 59.31 sq mi (153.62 km^{2})
  - Land: 48 sq mi (125 km^{2})
  - Water: 11.05 sq mi (28.62 km^{2})

Population (2020)
  - Total: 15,985
  - Estimate (2025): 15,077 ▼
  - Rank: 66th in Puerto Rico
  - Density: 331/sq mi (128/km^{2})
- Demonym: Patillenses
- Time zone: UTC−4 (AST)
- ZIP Code: 00723
- Area code: 787/939

Patillas (Spanish pronunciation: [paˈtiʎas], locally [paˈtiʎaʔ]) is a beach town and municipality of Puerto Rico located in the southeastern coast, south of San Lorenzo; west of Yabucoa and Maunabo; and east of Guayama and Arroyo. It is spread over 15 barrios and Patillas Pueblo (the downtown area and the administrative center of the city). It is part of the Guayama Metropolitan Statistical Area.

== History ==
Europeans had settled the area as early as 1760. There was, however, no permanent settlement until the town was officially founded in 1811. In 1841 a fire in Patillas killed many people.

Patillas is located along the southeastern coast of the main island of Puerto Rico. Doña Adelina Cintrón, owner of "La Finca Patillas", donated almost 8 acres (32,000 m^{2}) of land for the construction of the basic municipal works. Most of the neighbors then relocated to the west side of the proposed site called Cacao Bajo. The fundamental reason for the formation of the town was the establishment of sugar mills, known locally as centrales, in the valley

Puerto Rico was ceded by Spain in the aftermath of the Spanish–American War under the terms of the Treaty of Paris of 1898 and became a territory of the United States. In 1899, the United States Department of War conducted a census of Puerto Rico finding that the population of Patillas was 11,163.

On September 20, 2017 Hurricane Maria struck the island of Puerto Rico. In Patillas, power was out and 341 homes were completely destroyed. Wind and rain triggered numerous landslides making roads inaccessible.

== Geography ==
Patillas is located on the southeastern coast. Despite being located in the region known as the Coast Valley of the South, a part of the town is mountainous. The Sierra de Cayey borders the town's territory through the northern region, and the Sierra de Guardarraya through the east. The highest point in the municipality of Patillas is Cerro La Santa, which is also the highest point of the Sierra de Cayey. The city is located in USDA plant hardiness zone 13a (60 to 65 °F/15.6 to 18.3 °C), although the municipality also contains hardiness zones 12b and 12a (55 to 60 °F/12.8 to 15.6 °C and 50 to 55 °F/10 to 12.8 °C) at higher elevations.

=== Map References ===
Coordinates: 18.0064° N, 66.0158° W Zip Code: 00723 Driving Distance from San Juan: 59.6 miles Driving Time: 1 hour, 31 minutes

==== Transportation ====
Puerto Rico Highway 53 and Puerto Rico Highway 3 provide access to Patillas from the nearby city of Ponce. Patillas lies at about 1.25 hours from San Juan.

There was an airport, Patillas Airport, but it did not have any commercial air service when it was closed. The nearest commercial airport with international air service (to the United States mainland) is Mercedita Airport in Ponce. The nearest commercial airport with major commercial air service is Luis Muñoz Marín International Airport in Carolina.

There are 32 bridges in Patillas.

=== Barrios ===
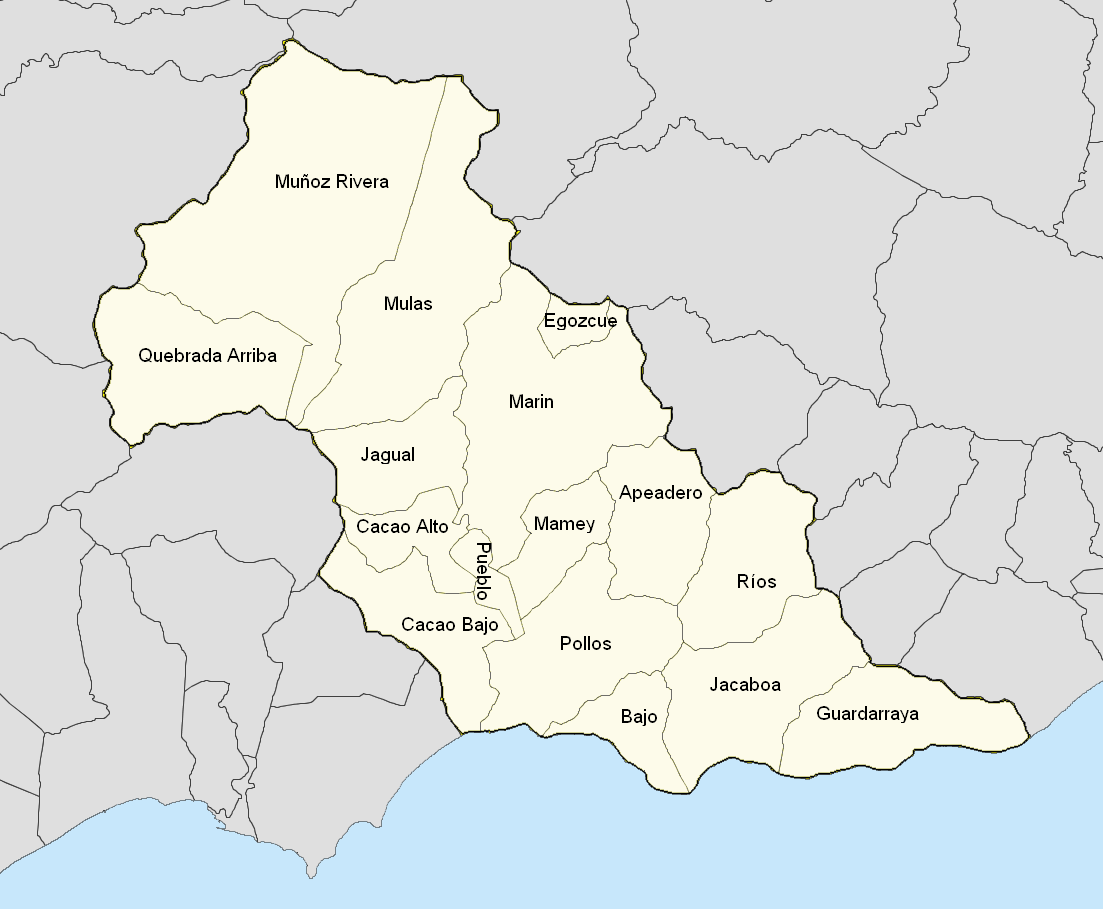
These are the barrios, or subdivisions, of Patillas, a municipality in the southeastern area of Puerto Rico.

Like all municipalities of Puerto Rico, Patillas is subdivided into barrios. The municipal buildings, central square and large Catholic church are located in a barrio referred to as "el pueblo".

1. Apeadero
2. Bajo
3. Cacao Alto
4. Cacao Bajo
5. Egozcue
6. Guardarraya
7. Jacaboa
8. Jagual
9. Mamey
10. Marín
11. Mulas
12. Muñoz Rivera
13. Patillas barrio-pueblo
14. Pollos
15. Quebrada Arriba
16. Ríos

=== Sectors ===
Barrios (which are like minor civil divisions) and subbarrios, are further subdivided into smaller areas called sectores (sectors in English). The types of sectores may vary, from normally sector to urbanización to reparto to barriada to residencial, among others.

=== Special Communities ===
Comunidades Especiales de Puerto Rico (Special Communities of Puerto Rico) are marginalized communities whose citizens are experiencing a certain amount of social exclusion. A map shows these communities occur in nearly every municipality of the commonwealth. Of the 742 places that were on the list in 2014, the following barrios, communities, sectors, or neighborhoods were in Patillas: Sector Barro Blanco in Bajos, Sector Higüero in Jacaboa, Sector Recio in Guardarraya, and Quebrada Arriba.

== Tourism ==
=== Landmarks and places of interest ===
There are 28 beaches in Patillas. Inches Beach in Patillas is considered a dangerous beach.

Some places of interest in Patillas include:

- Charco Azul
- Los Tres Chorros
- Carite State Forest
- Escondida Beach
- Guardarraya Beach
- Charco de la Vuelta
- Villa Pesquera Beach
- Lago de Patillas
- Guavate Forest and places to eat on the boundary with Cayey

=== Festivals and events ===
Patillas celebrates its patron saint festival in August. The Fiestas Patronales de San Benito Abad is a religious and cultural celebration that generally features parades, games, artisans, amusement rides, regional food, and live entertainment.

Other festivals and events celebrated in Patillas include:

- Emerald of the South Carnival – May
- Southeast Marathon – November
- Wheat Flour Festival – December
- Christmas Parade – December

=== Bodies of water ===
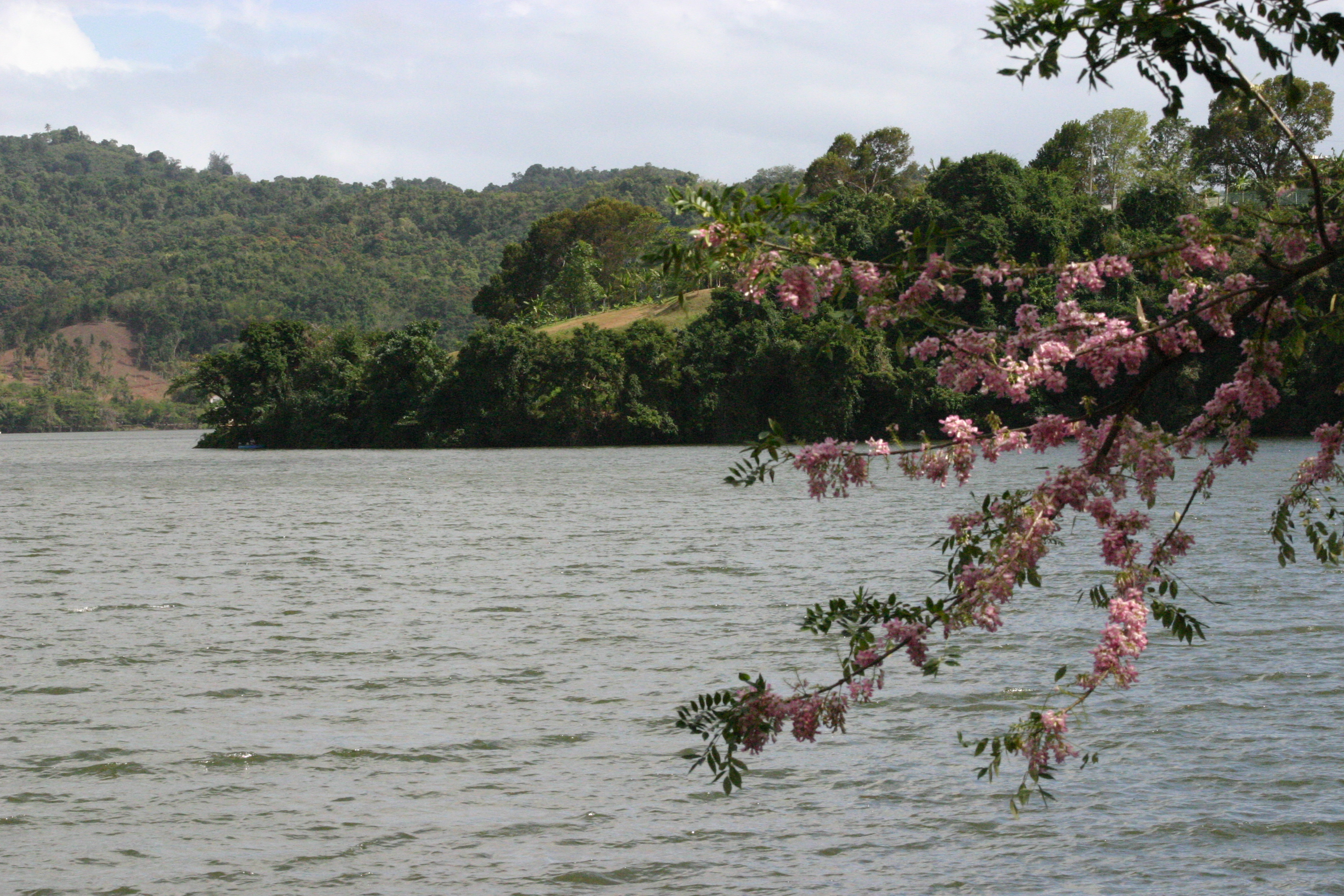
Lago Patillas is a man-made reservoir in Patillas.

Río de Apeadero, Río Chico, Río Grande de Patillas, Río Jacaboa, and Río Marín (rivers) and a number of creeks flow through Patillas. There is also the Patillas Reservoir called Lago Patillas which was built in 1914. The Patillas and Marín Rivers flow into the reservoir which is also used for fishing.

== Economy ==
In 2021 the Leader of the Association of Plantain Producers in Puerto Rico indicated the town was one of the main areas of production of plantains.

== Demographics ==
Historical population
Census	Pop.	Note	%±
1900	11,163		—
1910	14,448		29.4%
1920	14,284		−1.1%
1930	14,178		−0.7%
1940	17,319		22.2%
1950	18,851		8.8%
1960	17,106		−9.3%
1970	17,828		4.2%
1980	17,774		−0.3%
1990	19,633		10.5%
2000	20,152		2.6%
2010	19,277		−4.3%
2020	15,985		−17.1%
2025 (est.)	15,077	▼	−5.7%
U.S. Decennial Census; 1899 (shown as 1900) 1910-1930; 1930-1950 1960-2000 2010 2020

According to the 2000 census, Patillas had a population of 20,152 with a population density is 426.0 people per square mile (163.9/km^{2}). There was a decline in the population during the 1960s and the 1990s and most recently in the 2010 and 2020 census.

Puerto Rico is primarily made up of a mix of ancestors from Indigenous, European or African descent. Statistics from the 2000 census shows that 67.7% of Patillenses self-identify as European or white origin; only 12.3% self-identify as Afro Puerto Rican and 0.5% self-identify as Amerindian.

Race - Patillas, Puerto Rico - 2000 Census
Race	Population	% of Total
White	13,633	67.7%
Black/African American	2,482	12.3%
American Indian and Alaska Native	95	0.5%
Asian	23	0.1%
Native Hawaiian/Pacific Islander	7	0.0%
Some other race	1,452	7.2%
Two or more races	2,460	12.2%

== Government ==
Like all municipalities in Puerto Rico, Patillas is administered by a mayor. The current mayor is Maritza Sánchez Neris, from the New Progressive Party (PNP). Sanchez was elected at the 2020 general election.

The city belongs to the Puerto Rico Senatorial district VII, which is represented by two Senators. In 2024, Wanda Soto Tolentino and Luis Daniel Colón La Santa were elected as District Senators.

== Education ==
Patillas has several public and private schools distributed through several regions. Public education is handled by the Puerto Rico Department of Education.

== Symbols ==
The municipio has an official flag and coat of arms.

=== Flag ===
The flag of Patillas has four green rectangles on the corners that symbolize the valleys and mountains of the town. These rectangles are separated by a golden cross symbolizing the fidelity to the town's religious patron "El Santo Cristo de la Salud". Superimposed in the middle of the golden cross is an emerald, thus the nickname "La Esmeralda del Sur".

The art design of the flag was a creation of Pedro de Pedro in 1977. Each symbol on the flag was defined by Pedro J. Rivera Arbolay. The legal assessor was the attorney Roberto Beascochea Lota.

=== Coat of arms ===
The coat of arms features a crow with a piece of bread in its beak, which represents the bird that saved the life of San Benito Abad, patron of the town, from being poisoned with a piece of bread. The castle with three windows symbolizes the captivity of Santa Barbara, matron of Patillas in the first years of the foundation and the devotion to the Holy Trinity. The cross represents Santo Cristo de la Salud. The two crossed machetes underneath the cross represent the peasants' struggle in the sugar cane plantations and the origins of economic development. The three towers in the superior part mean that Patillas is categorized as a town. The watermelon leaf, fruit that abounded in the west of Patillas, is the reason for the name of the town. The motto "Ora et Labora", means "Pray and Work"; motto of the religious order of San Benito Abad.

=== Names ===
The name Patillas is originally an indigenous name for a native type of watermelon. The large abundance of this fruit in the area, along with the land donation from the original owner, lead to the town's name.

=== The Emerald of the South ===
Although it is both a mountain town and a beach town, Patillas is known as the "Emerald of the South" for its majestic green color that stands out from the mountains with the reflection of the sun. This town has a number of natural resources such as beaches, forests, and the Patillas Lake. The coastal waters and the lake are used by many for recreational fishing.

=== Anthem: "Patillenses" ===
By Andrés Plaud Soto

"Patillenses, ¡Veis la luz, de la antorcha y su esplendor, que ilumina en noble gesta de amor... la ruta que recorrió, el que por ti ayer luchó, en las lides de los campos del honor!

No olvidéis otras proezas en las Artes del Saber, producto de otros hermanos, que este pueblo vio nacer. Sus conquistas celebramos con solemne admiración: ¡Hosana mis compueblanos... Les brindo mi corazón!"

== Transportation ==
The city had a general aviation airport, Patillas Airport. It has since been deactivated.

== Notable "Patillenses" ==
- David "Quique" Bernier - Dentist, athlete, politician and 2016 nominee for governor under the Popular Democratic Party who served in various roles in public service in Puerto Rico.
- Francisco Cervoni-Gely – poet, playwright, journalist, and political figure. He was a delegate to the House for Guayama (1911 – 1912). His plays include Los suegros (1897) and La cruz roja (1928). His poetry was published in newspapers and magazines.
- Gaspar Cochran – Recreational leader of Patillas in 1952 and the first to register a baseball team class "A" called the Lions of Patillas. For 20 years he was director of the annual Patron Saint Festivals.
- José Dávila Ricci – political figure and journalist. Dávila was a member of the governing board of the Liberal Party (1932 – 1940). He also founded and presided the Puerto Rico Journalism Association (1938). He collaborated with newspapers such as El Mundo and El Universal, and headed La Democracia (1928 – 1932), Puerto Rico Ilustrado (1937 – 1938) and El Imparcial.
- Edmundo Disdier – musician and composer
- Olga D. González-Sanabria - Scientist and inventor
- Luisa Lebrón Burgos - Judge, politician, and former member of the Senate of Puerto Rico from 1993 to 2000. She currently serves as a judge in the Carolina region
- Ramón Lebrón-Rodríguez – writer. His works include Esbozo histórico del Derecho Penal (1916) and La vida de un prócer (1954)
- Angelita Lind – Winner of three gold medals, 3 silver medals and 1 bronze medal, she participated in 3 Central American and Caribbean Games, 3 Pan American Games and the Olympics in Los Angeles, California
- Emilio "Millito" Navarro (born September 26, 1905, in the city of Patillas, Puerto Rico) - First Puerto Rican to play baseball in the Negro leagues.
- Paulino Rodríguez – His literary work includes: Gotas de Estío (children's reading), The Son of Regret (novel), My Lonely Garden (poetry), and the History of the Town of Patillas.
- Jalil Sued-Badillo – historian and teacher
- Cirilo Tirado Rivera - Politician
- Awilda Villarini - composer and pianist

== See also ==
- List of Puerto Ricans
- History of Puerto Rico
- Did you know-Puerto Rico?
