= Santa Cruz, Carolina, Puerto Rico =

Barrio of Puerto Rico

Santa Cruz
- Barrio
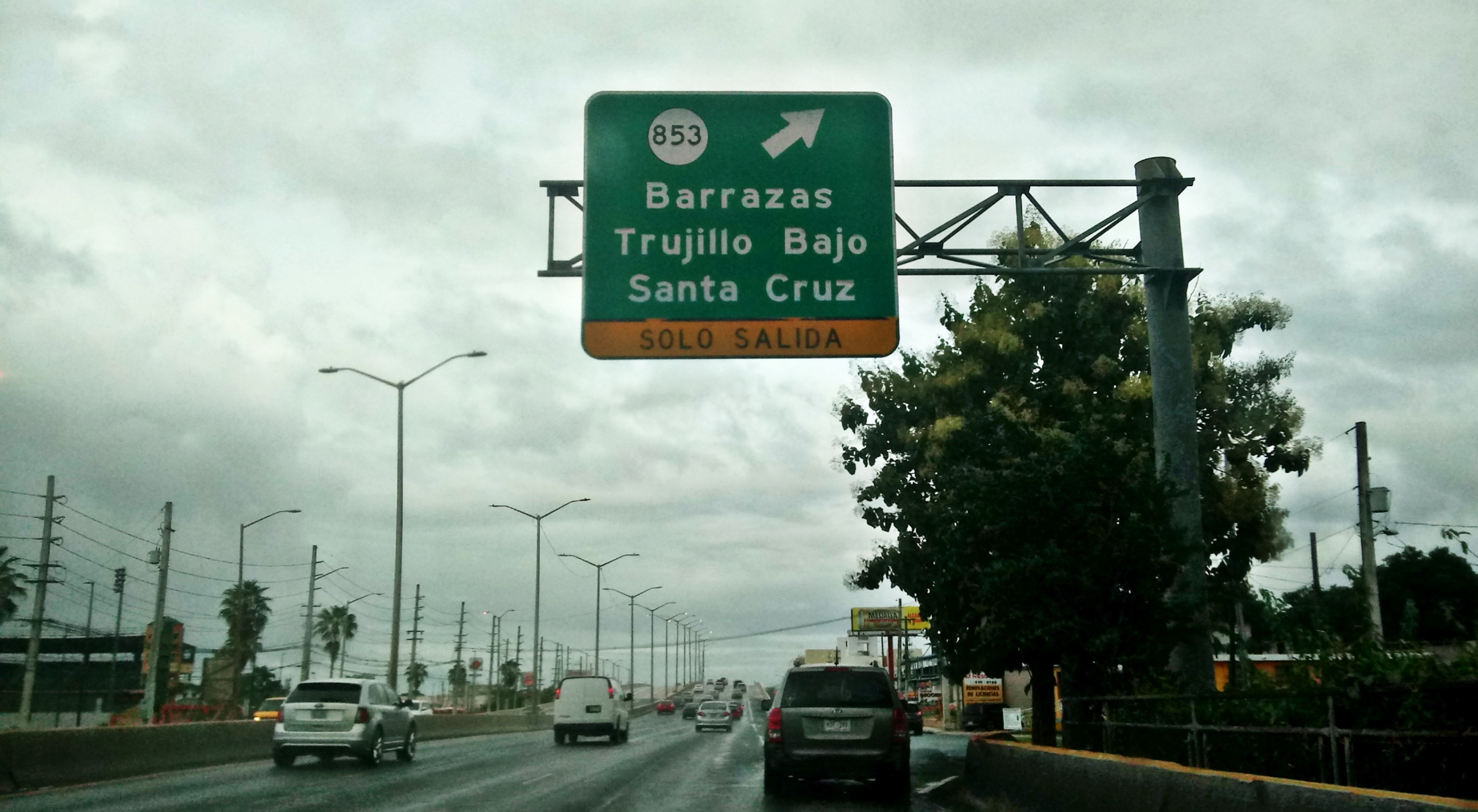
- Sign for Barrazas, Trujillo Bajo and Santa Cruz

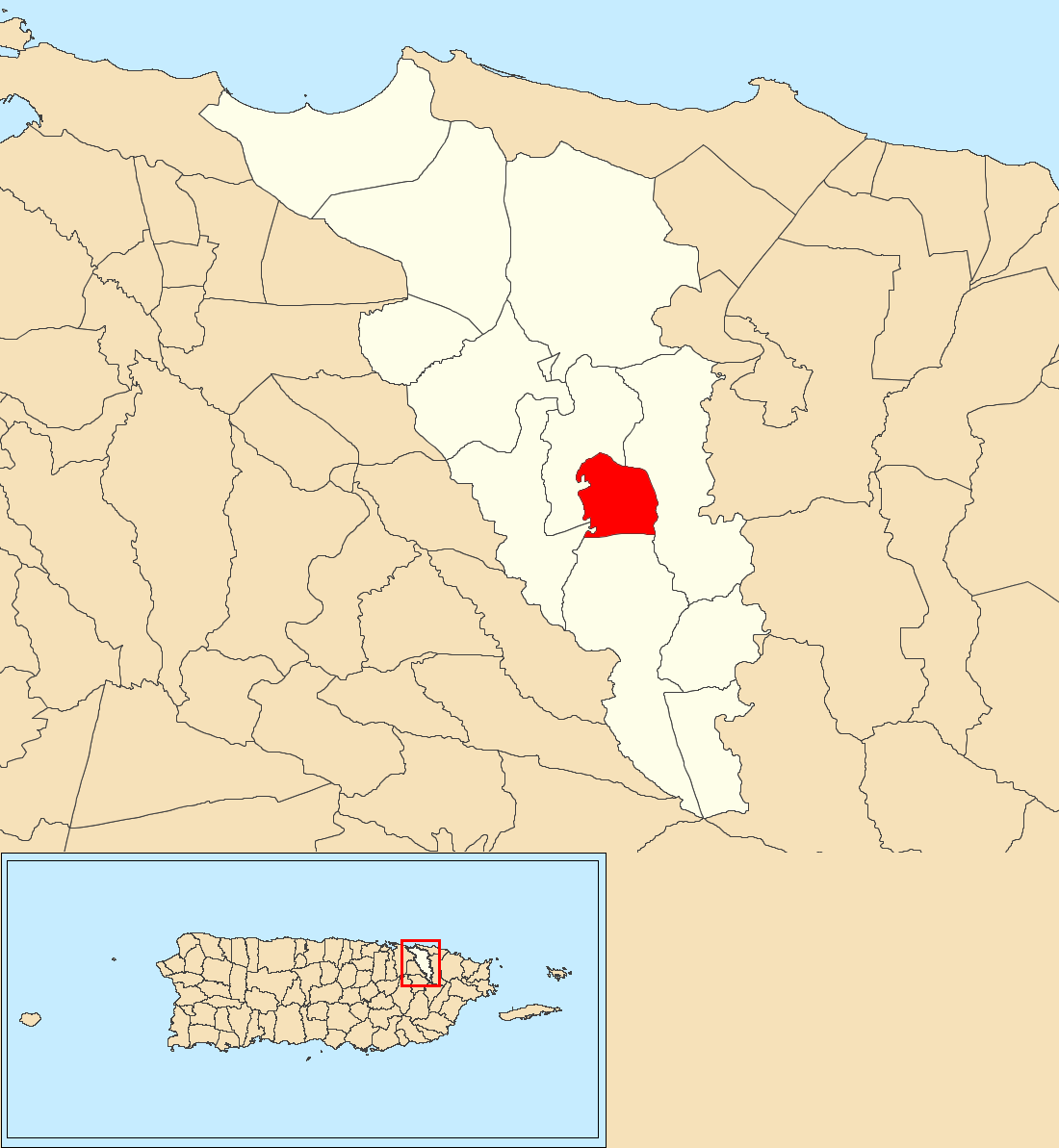
- Location of Santa Cruz within the municipality of Carolina shown in red

- Location of Puerto Rico
- Coordinates: 18°20′57″N 65°56′23″W
- Commonwealth: Puerto Rico
- Municipality: Carolina

Area
  - Total: 1.39 sq mi (3.6 km^{2})
  - Land: 1.39 sq mi (3.6 km^{2})
  - Water: 0 sq mi (0 km^{2})
- Elevation: 394 ft (120 m)

Population (2010)
  - Total: 1,927
  - Density: 1,386.3/sq mi (535.3/km^{2})
- Source: 2010 Census
- Time zone: UTC−4 (AST)

Santa Cruz is a barrio in the municipality of Carolina, Puerto Rico. According to the 2010 Census, its population in that year was 1,927.

== History ==
Santa Cruz was in Spain's gazetteers until Puerto Rico was ceded by Spain in the aftermath of the Spanish–American War under the terms of the Treaty of Paris of 1898 and became an unincorporated territory of the United States. In 1899, the United States Department of War conducted a census of Puerto Rico finding that the population of Santa Cruz barrio was 435.

Historical population
Census	Pop.	Note	%±
1900	435		—
1910	564		29.7%
1920	748		32.6%
1930	772		3.2%
1940	840		8.8%
1950	993		18.2%
1960	927		−6.6%
1970	1,186		27.9%
1980	1,597		34.7%
1990	1,920		20.2%
2000	2,025		5.5%
2010	1,927		−4.8%
U.S. Decennial Census; 1899 (shown as 1900) 1910-1930; 1930-1950 1980-2000 2010

== See also ==
- List of communities in Puerto Rico
