= Carolina, Puerto Rico =

City and municipality in Puerto Rico

Carolina Municipio Autónomo de Carolina
- City and Municipality
- San Fernando de la Carolina
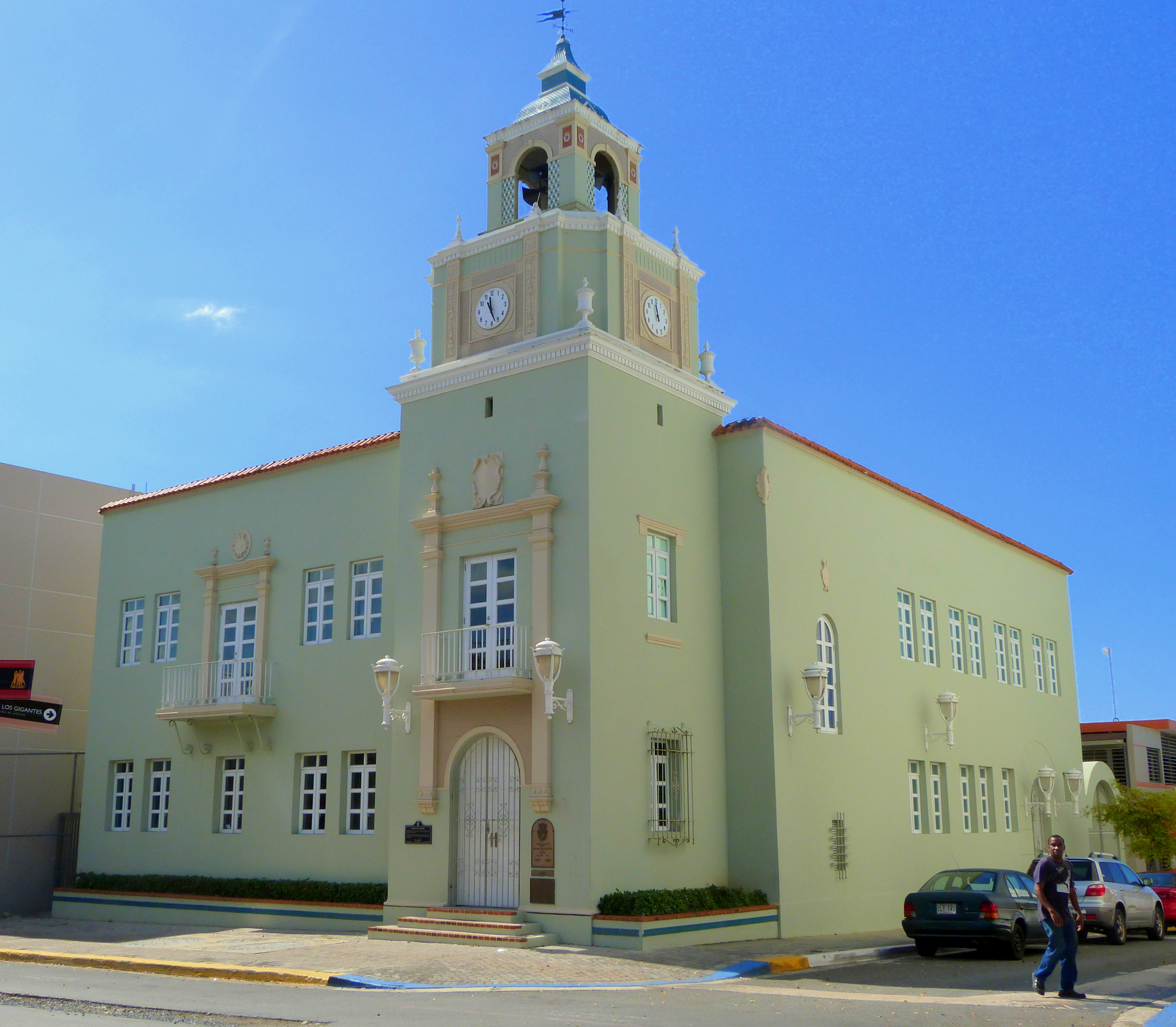
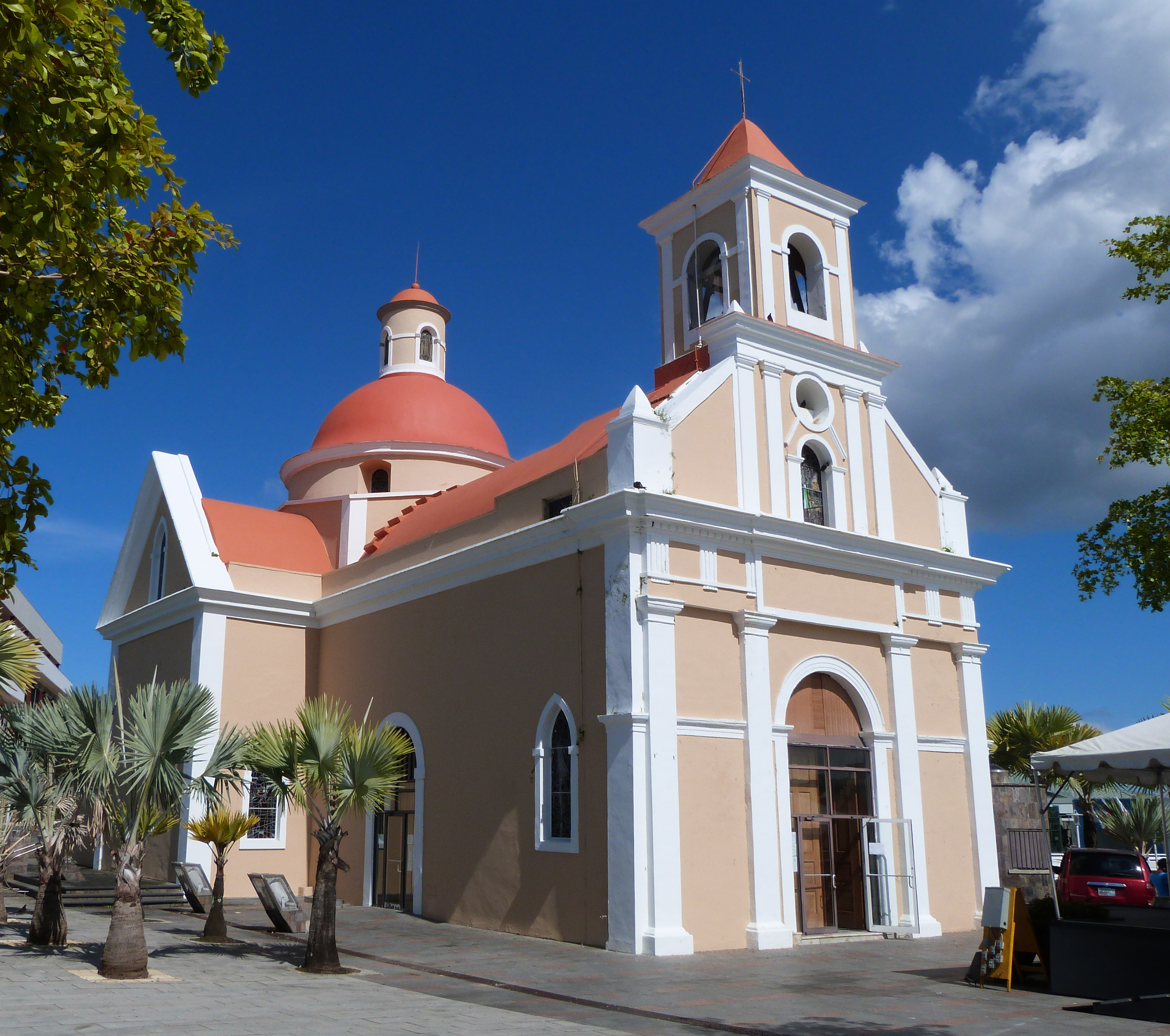
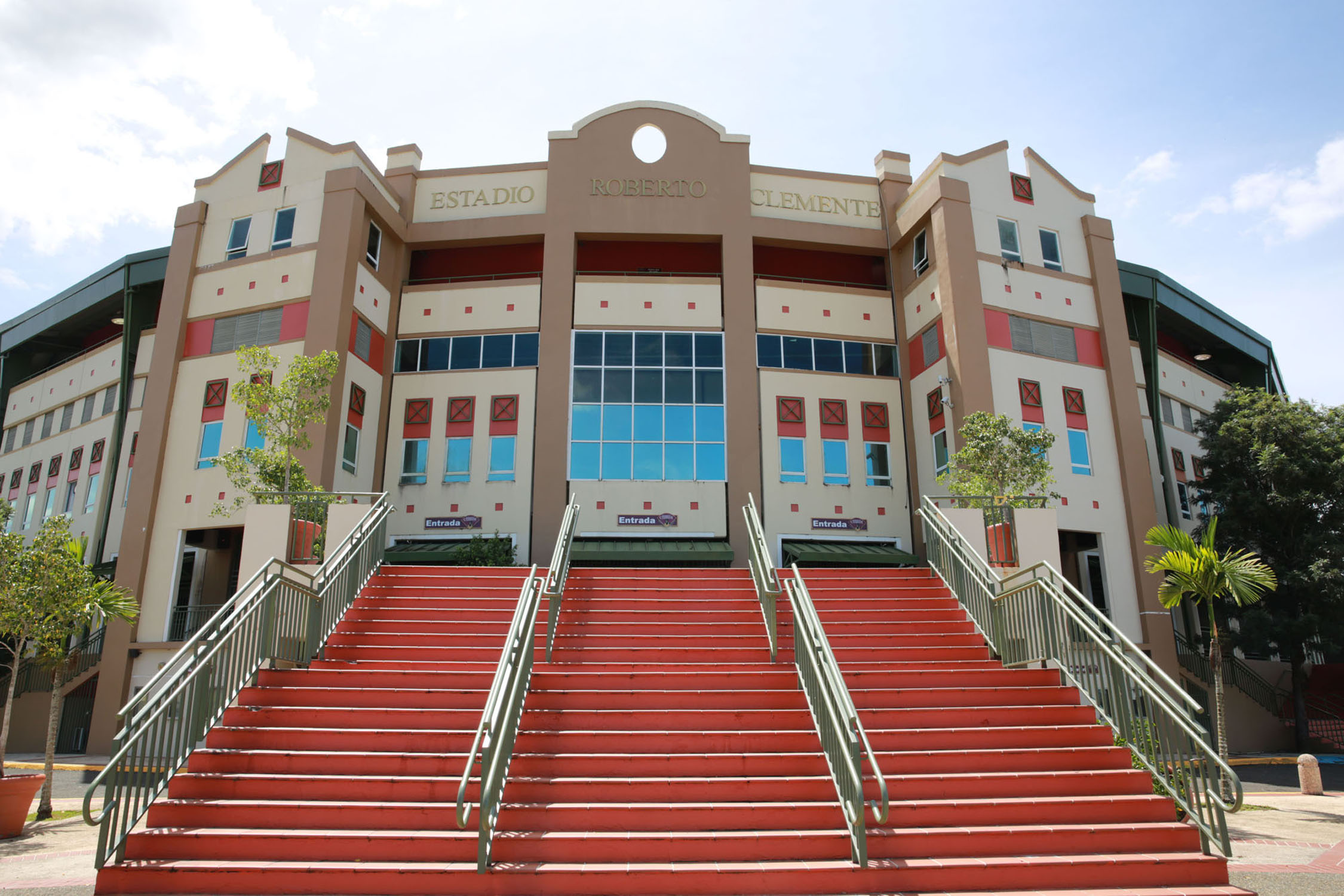
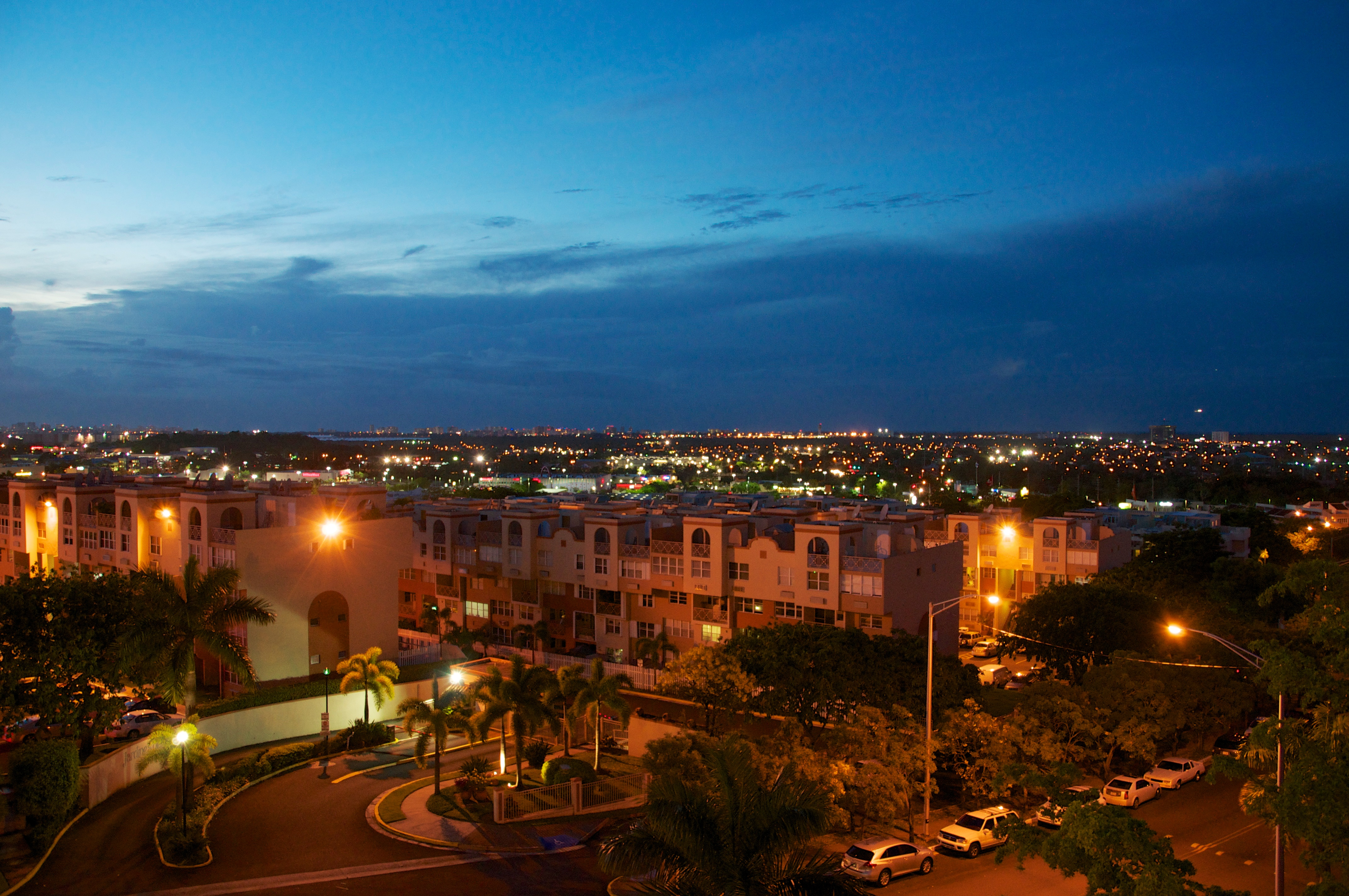
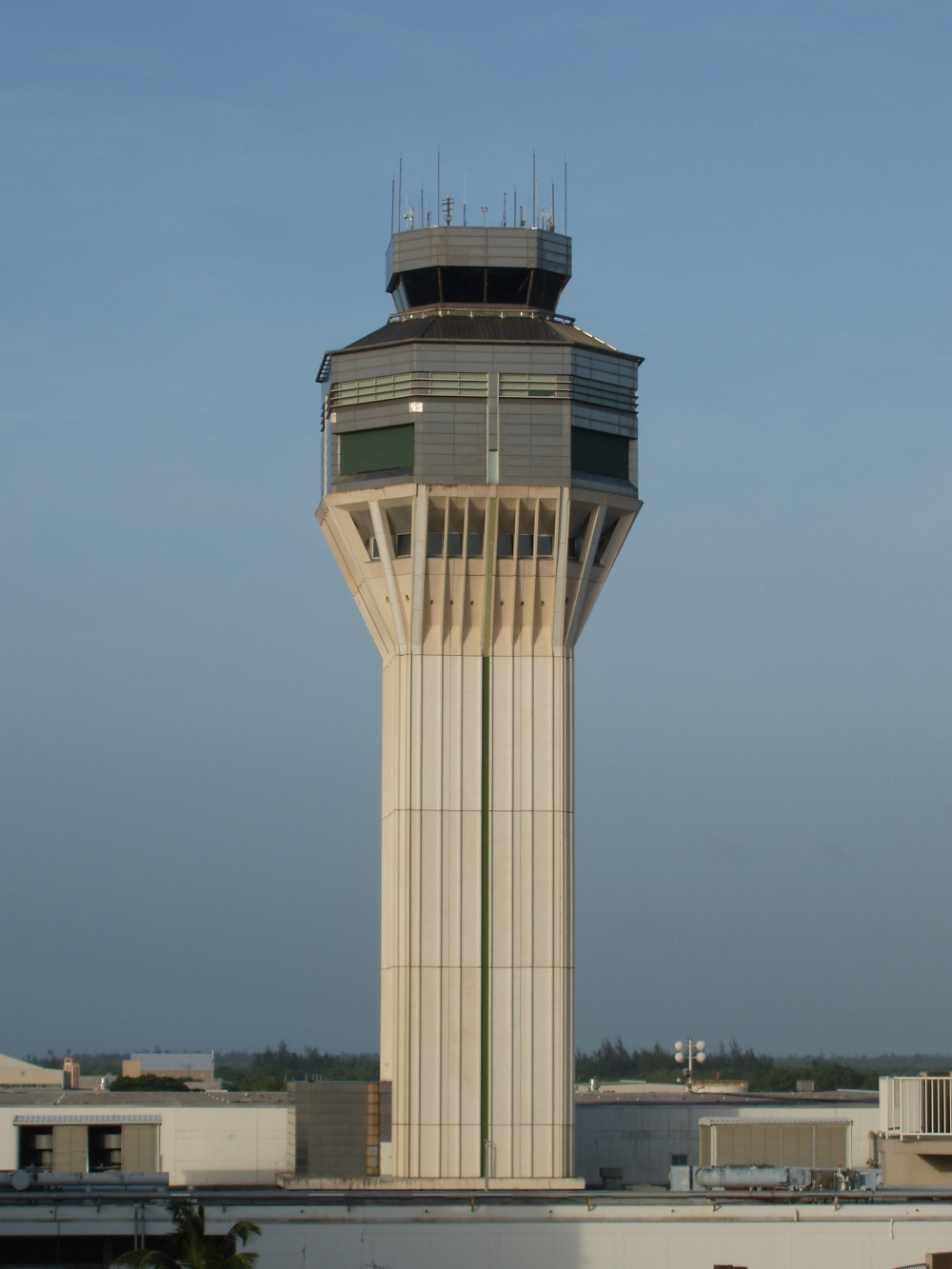
- Old City Hall of Carolina San Fernando Church Roberto Clemente Stadium Parque Escorial suburbs in San Antón SJU airport Isla Verde district

- Flag Coat of arms
- Nicknames: "Tierra de Gigantes"; Spanish for "Land of Giants" "El Pueblo de los Tumba Brazos"; Spanish for "Arm Hackers Town"
- Interactive map of Carolina
- Location within Puerto Rico Location within the Caribbean Location within North America
- Coordinates: 18°24′22″N 65°58′2″W
- Sovereign state: United States
- Commonwealth: Puerto Rico
- Settled: Late 17th century
- Founded: January 31, 1857
- Founder: Santiago Veve y Vidal
- Named for: Charles II of Spain
- Barrios: 13 barrios: Barrazas; Buena Vista; Cacao; Cangrejo Arriba; Canovanillas; Carolina barrio-pueblo; Carruzos; Cedro; Martín González; Sabana Abajo; San Antón; Santa Cruz; Trujillo Bajo

Government
  - Mayor: Jose C. Aponte Dalmau (PPD)
  - Senatorial dist.: 8 - Carolina
  - Representative dist.: 38, 39, 40

Area
  - Total: 60.34 sq mi (156.29 km^{2})
  - Land: 45.3 sq mi (117.4 km^{2})
  - Water: 15.02 sq mi (38.89 km^{2})
- Elevation: 52 ft (16 m)

Population (2020)
  - Total: 154,815
  - Estimate (2025): 149,874 ▼
  - Rank: 3rd in Puerto Rico
  - Density: 3,415/sq mi (1,319/km^{2})
- Demonym: Carolinense (neutral)
- Time zone: UTC−4 (AST)
- ZIP Codes: 00979, 00982, 00983, 00985, 00987, 00981, 00984, 00986, 00988
- Area code: 787/939
- Website: www.municipiocarolina.com

Carolina (/ˌkæroʊˈliːnə/; Spanish pronunciation: [kaɾoˈlina]) is a city and municipality on the northeastern coastal plain of Puerto Rico, immediately east of San Juan and Trujillo Alto, north of Gurabo and Juncos, and west of Canóvanas and Loíza. Part of the San Juan metropolitan area, Carolina encompasses 12 barrios, in addition to the downtown area and administrative center of Carolina Pueblo. In Carolina’s coastal region lies the resort and residential district of Isla Verde, where the main international airport of Puerto Rico, the Luis Muñoz Marín International Airport, is located. Carolina is the third-most populous municipality in the archipelago and island.

== History ==
The town was founded by Spanish colonists in 1816 as Trujillo Bajo ("lower Trujillo"), along with its counterpart Trujillo Alto after Trujillo, Spain. In 1857 it was renamed to San Fernando de la Carolina, later shortened to Carolina, after Charles II of Spain.

The city is known as "Tierra de Gigantes" (Land of Giants), not only for well-known Carolina resident Don Felipe Birriel González (who was 7'11"), but also in honor of other people from Carolina, including poet Julia de Burgos and most notably the first Latin American player named to baseball's Hall of Fame, Roberto Clemente. Carolina was also home to Jesús T. Piñero, the first Puerto Rican to be appointed as governor by the United States government. The city is also known as "El Pueblo de los Tumba Brazos" (The Arm Hackers' Town). During the late 1800s, the town's major export was sugarcane.

Puerto Rico was ceded by Spain in the aftermath of the Spanish–American War under the terms of the Treaty of Paris of 1898 and became a territory of the United States. In 1899, the United States Department of War conducted a census of Puerto Rico finding that the population of Carolina was 11,965.

Hurricane Maria on September 20, 2017 caused flooding in Carolina. The Río Grande de Loíza floods left around 500 homes uninhabitable. The Roberto Clemente stadium lost its roof and many other structures, bridges and roads were damaged to a toll of $87 million. Given the Luis Muñoz Marín International Airport is in Carolina, the destruction in Carolina created a challenge and the airport remained closed for three days. Two weeks after, the airport was attempting to operate a more regular schedule, but electricity was inconsistent and on October 10, nearly a month after the hurricane the airport was running on generators again.

== Geography ==
Carolina municipality has a number of rivers such as the Río Canovanillas, Río Grande de Loíza, La Torrecilla, Piñones Lagoons.

=== Barrios ===
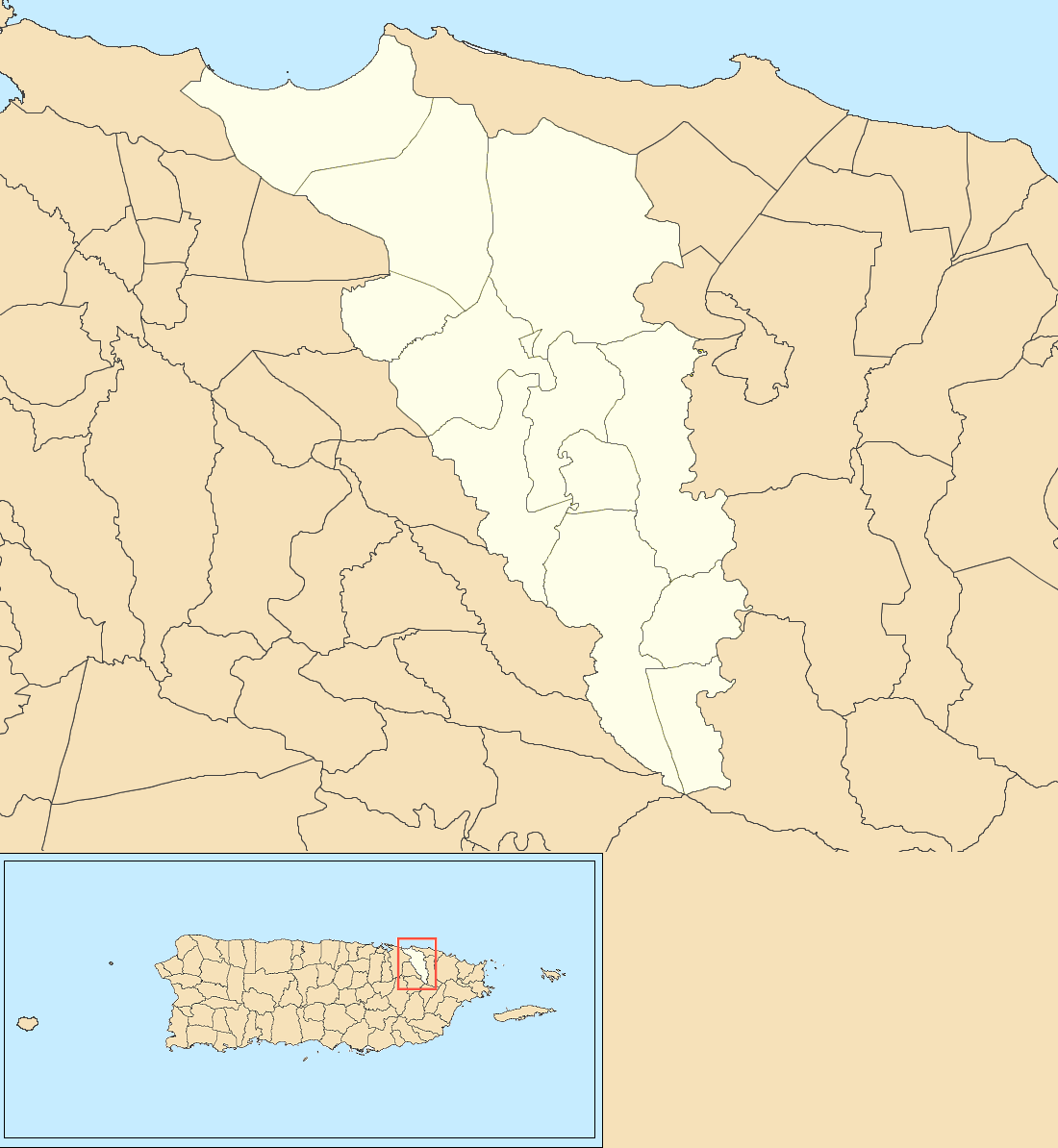
Subdivisions of Carolina.

Like all municipalities of Puerto Rico, Carolina is subdivided into barrios. The municipal buildings, central square and large Catholic church are located in a small barrio referred to as "el pueblo", near the center of the municipality.

1. Barrazas
2. Buena Vista
3. Cacao
4. Cangrejo Arriba
5. Canovanillas
6. Carolina barrio-pueblo
7. Carruzos
8. Cedro
9. Martín González
10. Sabana Abajo
11. San Antón
12. Santa Cruz
13. Trujillo Bajo

=== Sectors ===
Barrios (which are, in contemporary times, roughly comparable to minor civil divisions) and subbarrios, are further subdivided into smaller areas called sectores (sectors in English). The types of sectores may vary, from normally sector to urbanización to reparto to barriada to residencial, among others.

=== Special Communities ===
Comunidades Especiales de Puerto Rico (Special Communities of Puerto Rico) are marginalized communities whose citizens are experiencing a certain amount of social exclusion. A map shows these communities occur in nearly every municipality of the commonwealth. Of the 742 places that were on the list in 2014, the following barrios, communities, sectors, or neighborhoods were in Carolina: Colo, Martín González, Buena Vista, Buenaventura, Canovanillas (Estancias del Parque), Cuesta Quiles, Eduardo J. Saldaña - La Cerámica, La Villas (Justicia y Esperanza), Sabana Abajo Norte, Sabana Abajo Sur, Saint Just, San Antón, and Villa Caridad.

== Tourism ==
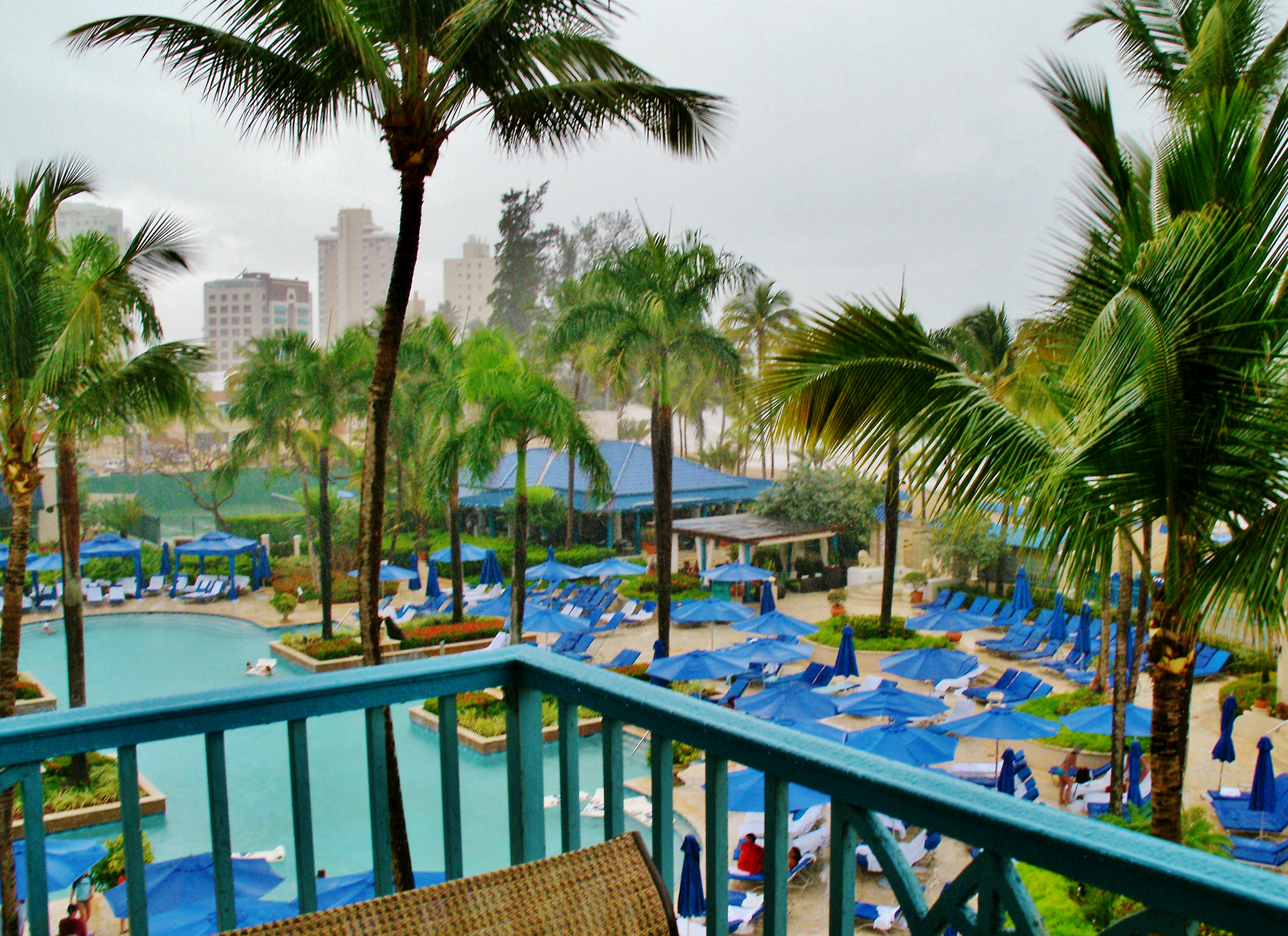
Ritz-Carlton in Carolina

Carolina is one of Puerto Rico's most important tourist centers. Luis Muñoz Marín International Airport, the territory's main airport, is located in Isla Verde. Also located in Carolina are a large group of hotels, which sit by Carolina's large beach area of Isla Verde.

There are several well-known hotels on the coast of Carolina (Isla Verde area), including the Fairmont El San Juan Hotel, InterContinental San Juan Hotel and The Ritz-Carlton, San Juan Hotel, Spa, and Casino. Isla Verde has an Orthodox Jewish synagogue, Chabad of Puerto Rico, the only Orthodox Jewish synagogue in Puerto Rico, which serves the island's Jewish residents and visiting tourists.

To stimulate local tourism, the Puerto Rico Tourism Company launched the Voy Turistiendo ("I'm Touring") campaign, with a passport book and website. The Carolina page lists Hacienda Campo Rico, El Museo del Niño, and Balneario de Carolina, as places of interest.

=== Landmarks and places of interest ===
There are 4 beaches in Carolina, including Balneario de Isla Verde.

- Buena Vista Ruins
- Carolina Beach
- Loíza's Big River
- Isla Verde Club Gallístico
- Luis Muñoz Marín International Airport
- Jesús T. Piñero Monument
- Julia de Burgos Park
- Roberto Clemente Ciudad Deportiva

== Economy ==
Carolina is the home of Plaza Carolina, one of Puerto Rico's largest shopping malls.

Executive Airlines, an aircraft ground handling company and subsidiary of American Airlines, is headquartered on the grounds of Luis Muñoz Marín International Airport in Carolina.

=== Industrial ===
Manufacturing (pharmaceutical, medical equipment and chemical) and commerce.

== Culture ==
=== Festivals and events ===
Carolina celebrates its patron saint festival in late May / early June. The Fiestas Patronales de San Fernando is a religious and cultural celebration that generally features parades, games, artisans, amusement rides, regional food, and live entertainment. The festival has featured live performances by well-known artists such as Ismael Miranda, Sonora Ponceña, Andrés Jiménez, "el Jíbaro", Bobby Valentín, and Grupo Manía.

Other festivals and events celebrated in Carolina include:

- Jazz Night – third Friday of the month
- Bohemia Night – second Thursday of the month
- Youth Night – first Friday every two months
- Artisans' Market – one Sunday a month
- Roberto Clemente Week – August

=== Sports ===
In recent years, Carolina has seen the building of the Ciudad Deportiva Roberto Clemente or Roberto Clemente Sports City, a sports and recreation facility that aims to become a youth sports school, and the Roberto Clemente Stadium, host to many entertainment events and to the 2003 and 2007 Caribbean World Series. It has also played host to the Coliseo Guillermo Angulo, where the BSN's Gigantes de Carolina play, as well as the Gigantes of Puerto Rican women's professional basketball, the Gigantes of men's professional volleyball, and the Gigantes of women's professional volleyball.

The Gigantes de Carolina professional baseball team use the Roberto Clemente Stadium as their home field. There is also another team with the same name, the Giants de Carolina, a professional soccer team that plays in the Puerto Rico Soccer League. That team also uses the Roberto Clemente Stadium as its home field.

Professional horse jockey Emanuel Jose Sanchez was born in Carolina. Riding the mare Mark Me Special he captured the 7th race at Colonial Downs on June 19, 2005.

== Demographics ==
Puerto Rico was ceded by Spain in the aftermath of the Spanish–American War under the terms of the Treaty of Paris of 1898 and became a territory of the United States. In 1899, the United States conducted its first census of Puerto Rico finding that the population of Carolina was 11,965.

Historical population
Census	Pop.	Note	%±
1900	11,965		—
1910	15,327		28.1%
1920	15,563		1.5%
1930	18,751		20.5%
1940	24,046		28.2%
1950	29,224		21.5%
1960	40,923		40.0%
1970	107,643		163.0%
1980	165,954		54.2%
1990	177,806		7.1%
2000	186,076		4.7%
2010	176,762		−5.0%
2020	154,815		−12.4%
2025 (est.)	149,874	▼	−3.2%
U.S. Decennial Census; 1899 (shown as 1900) 1910-1930; 1930-1950 1960-2000 2010

Race - Carolina, Puerto Rico - 2020 Census
Race	Population	% of Total
White	21,998	14.2%
Black/Afro-Puerto Rican	42,299	27.3%
American Indian/Alaska Native	4,006	2.6%
Asian	593	0.4%
Two or more races/Some other race	85,919	55.5%

== Government ==
All municipalities in Puerto Rico are administered by a mayor, elected every four years. The current mayor of Carolina is José Aponte Dalmau, of the Popular Democratic Party (PPD). He was elected in 2007, after a special election, succeeding his late father, José Aponte de la Torre. Aponte de la Torre was elected mayor in 1984 and served for 23 years.

The city belongs to the Puerto Rico Senatorial district VIII, which is represented by two senators. In 2024, Marissa Jiménez and Héctor Joaquín Sánchez Álvarez were elected as District Senators.

The Carolina Police Department, with most of its precincts in the northern half of the city due to the density of the population, handle law enforcement responsibilities. Puerto Rico Police Department also has jurisdiction in Carolina, especially for narcotics enforcement, with four precincts positioned on all four points of the city.

Carolina created the first municipal fire department in Puerto Rico. The Carolina Fire Department in collaboration with the Carolina Municipal Emergency Management use two engine trucks, one ladder track and one special hazard engine truck. Their headquarters are located in the tourist district of Isla Verde. Also, the Puerto Rico Fire Department have a fire station and regional office in town, located on the Roberto Clemente Avenue.

== Transportation ==
There are 72 bridges in Carolina. The Teodoro Moscoso Bridge connects Carolina to San Juan. Luis Muñoz Marín International Airport is located in Carolina.

== Symbols ==
The municipio has an official flag and coat of arms.

=== Flag ===
The flag consists of three vertical bands, the laterals white and the middle red. The laterals are seeded with black ermine tails in the heraldic way as for the coat of arms. The middle band of the flag shows a red field with the sword and crown of the coat of arms.

=== Coat of arms ===
The crown over the sword is the main attribute for royalty and for that reason it occupies a privileged position in the coat of arms. The sword is not only a symbol for military service, but also one of justice, recalling the virtues of San Fernando. The coat of arms has a wide edge of silver, a cultivated field of small tails of ermine shown in the conventional heraldic manner. The red symbolizes the first patriotic developments made for Puerto Rico's freedom under Spanish dominion.

== Gallery ==
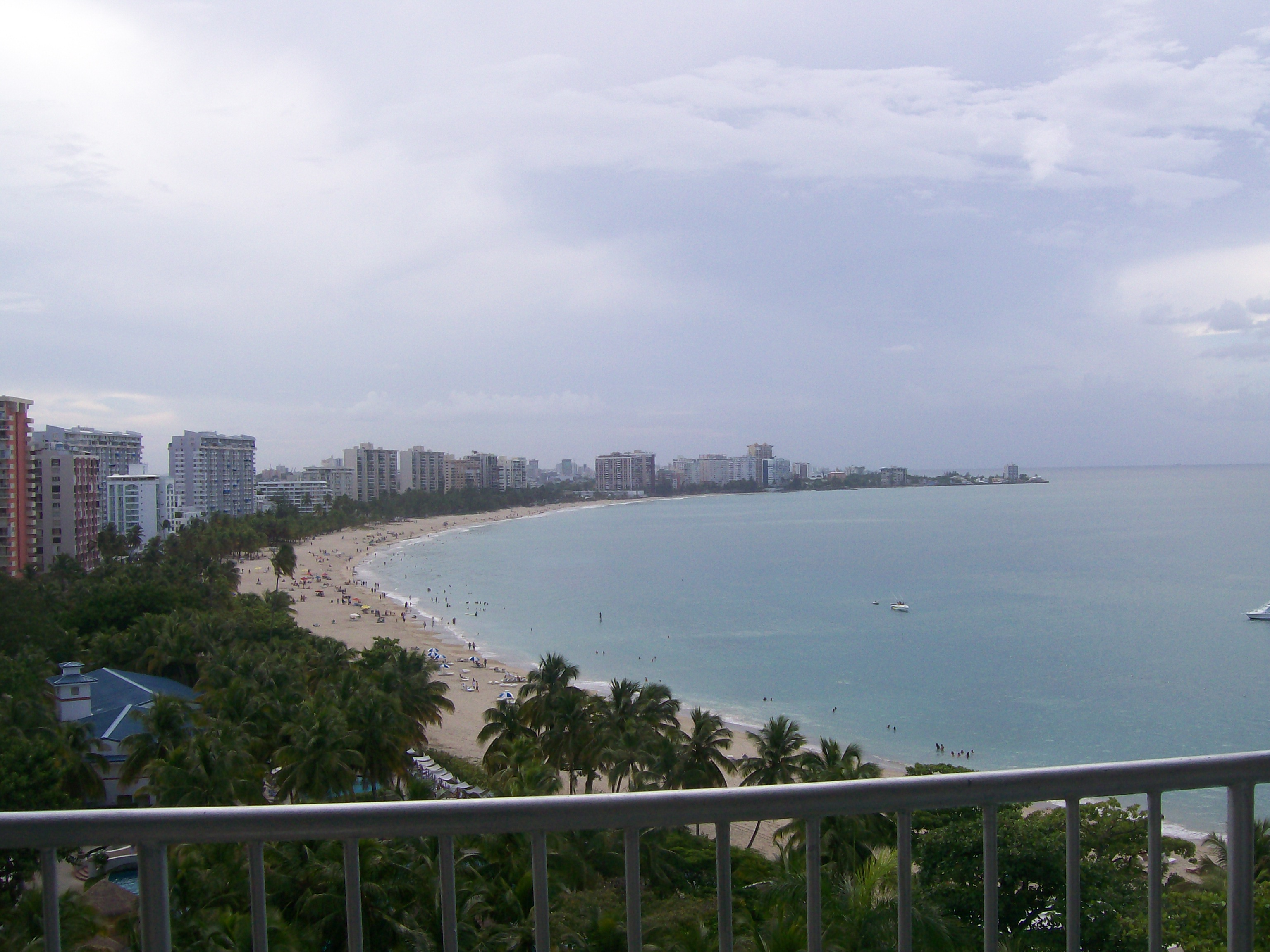
Isla Verde skyline in Carolina

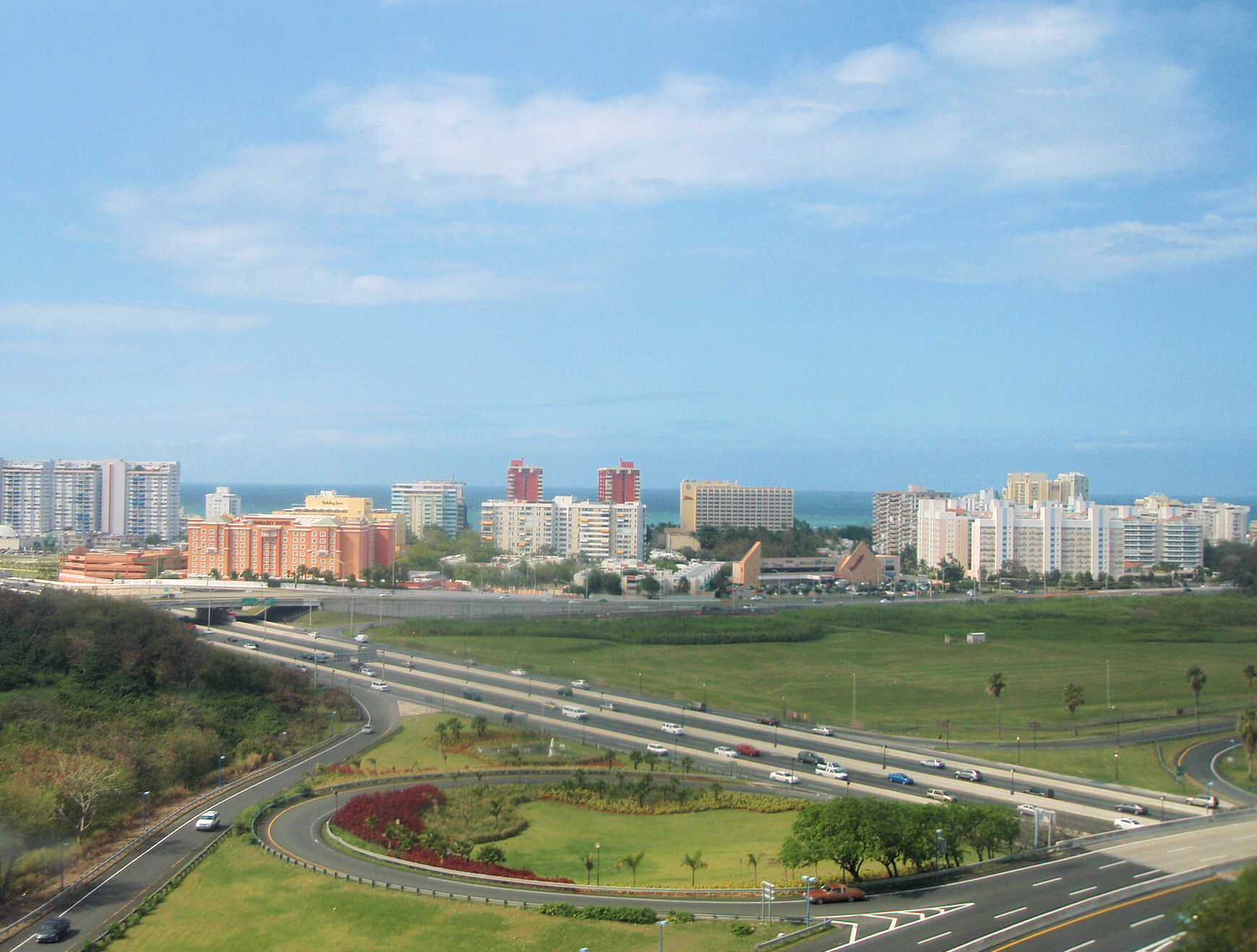
Isla Verde skyline in Carolina

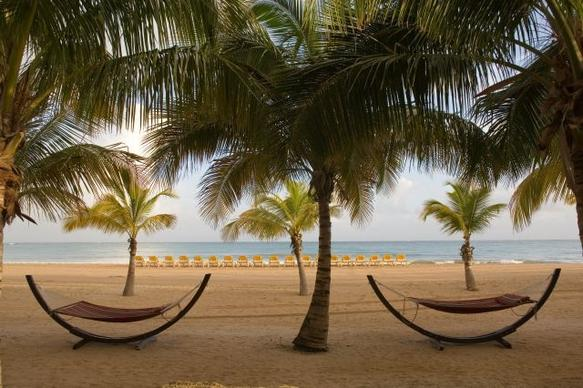
Courtyard by Marriott in Isla Verde Beach Resort

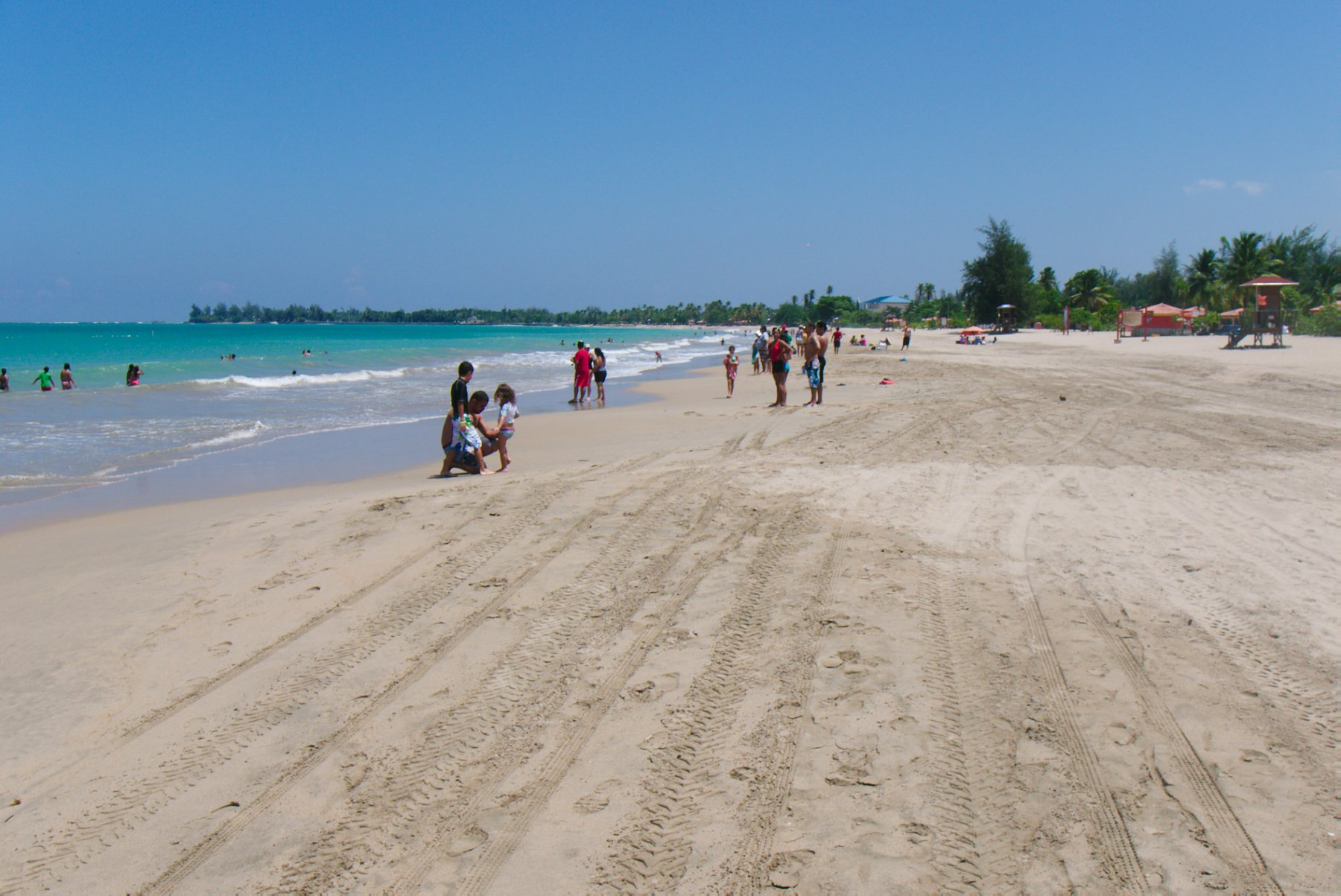
Beach of Balneario de Carolina

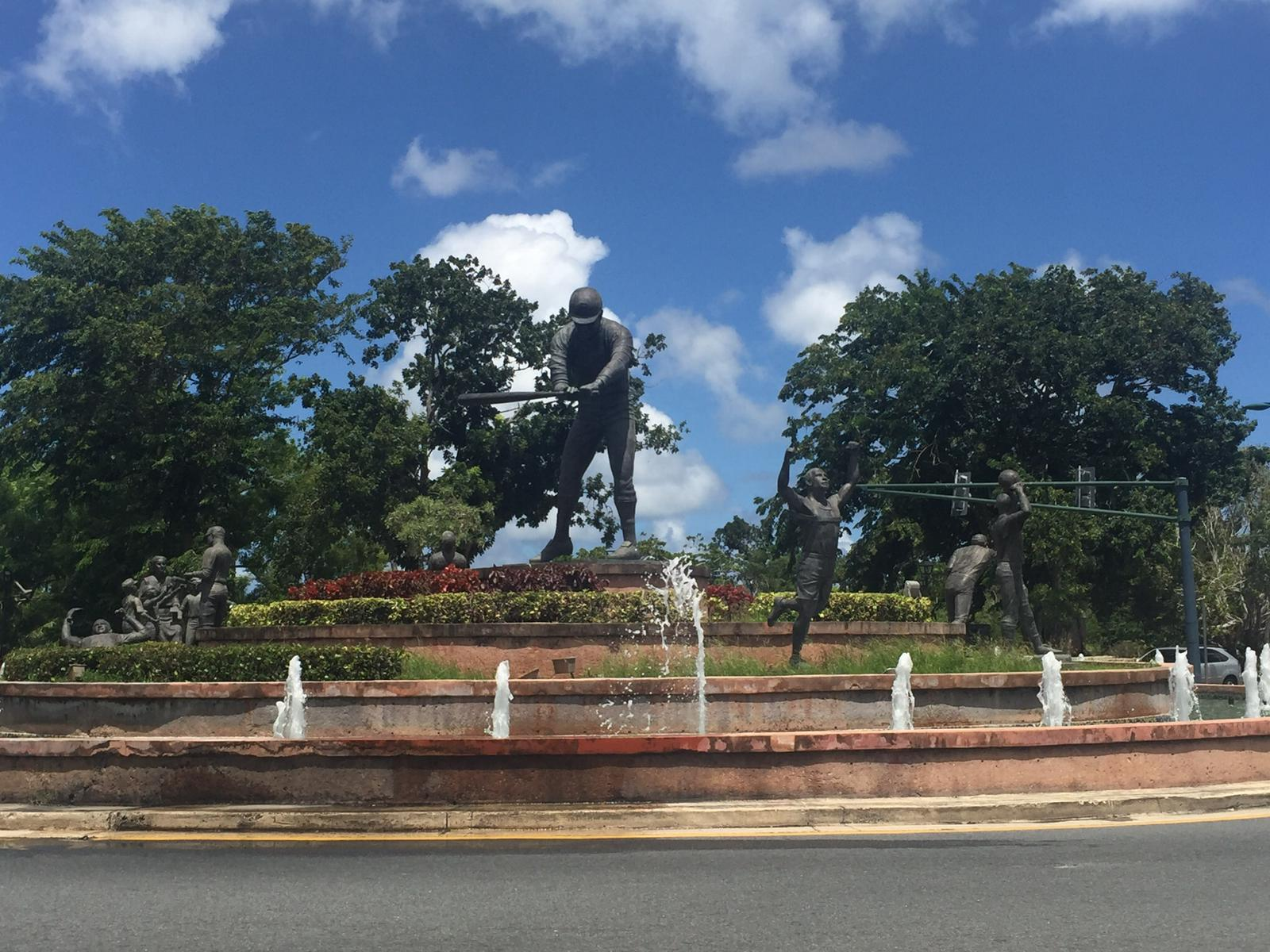
Roundabout of Roberto Clemente on Roberto Clemente Avenue

Statue of Roberto Clemente in Ciudad Deportiva Roberto Clemente

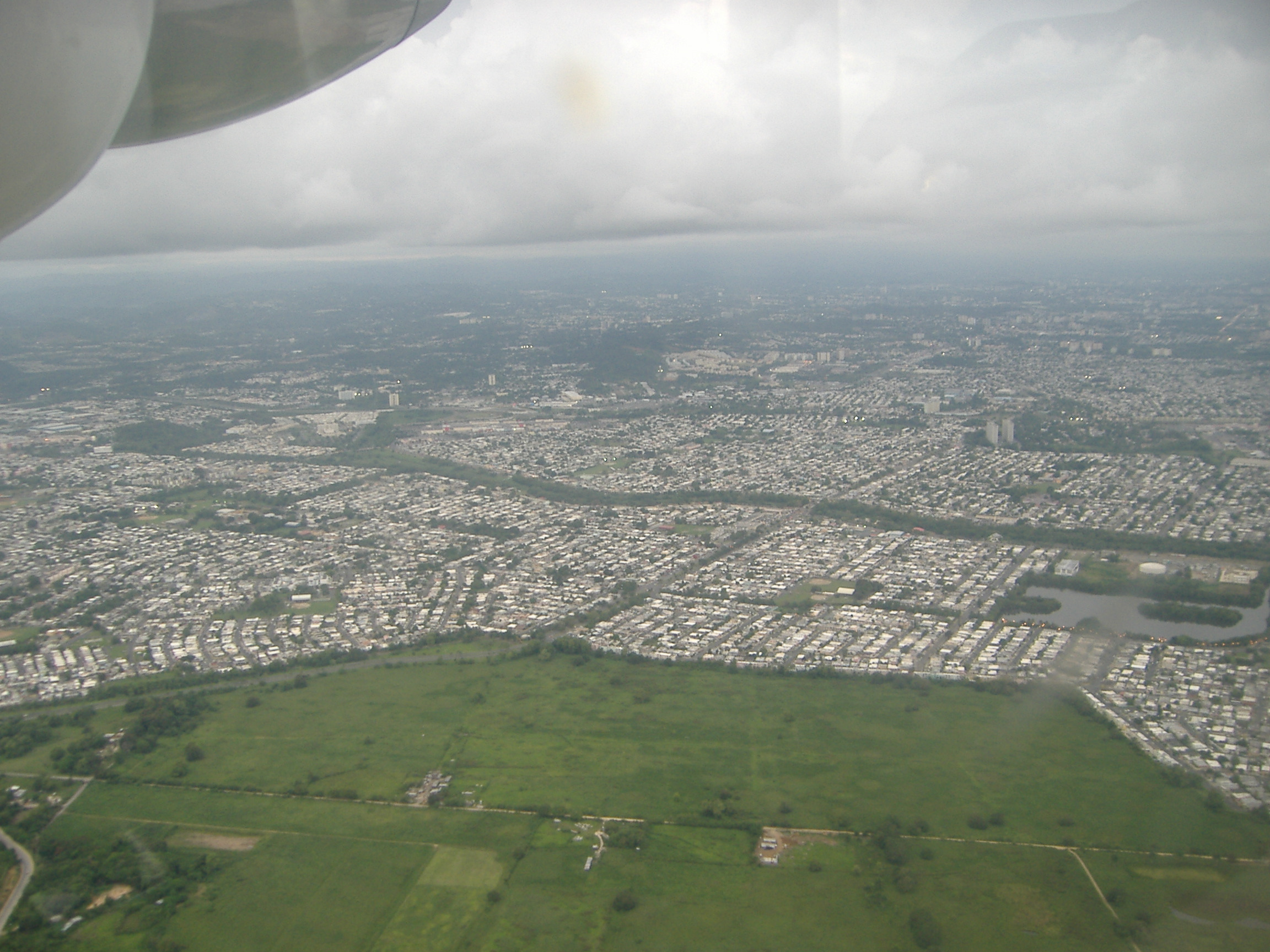
Aerial view of the city

== See also ==
- List of Puerto Ricans
- History of Puerto Rico

== Books ==
- Carolina, Puerto Rico: Land of Giants (2012) by Greg Boudonck and Maria Ruiz O'Farrill
