= Buena Vista, Puerto Rico =

Buena Vista is the name of several localities in Puerto Rico:

- Buena Vista, Bayamón, Puerto Rico
- Buena Vista, Carolina, Puerto Rico
- Buena Vista, Hatillo, Puerto Rico
- Buena Vista, Humacao, Puerto Rico
- Buena Vista, Las Marías, Puerto Rico
