= Trujillo Bajo, Carolina, Puerto Rico =

Barrio of Puerto Rico

Trujillo Bajo
- Barrio
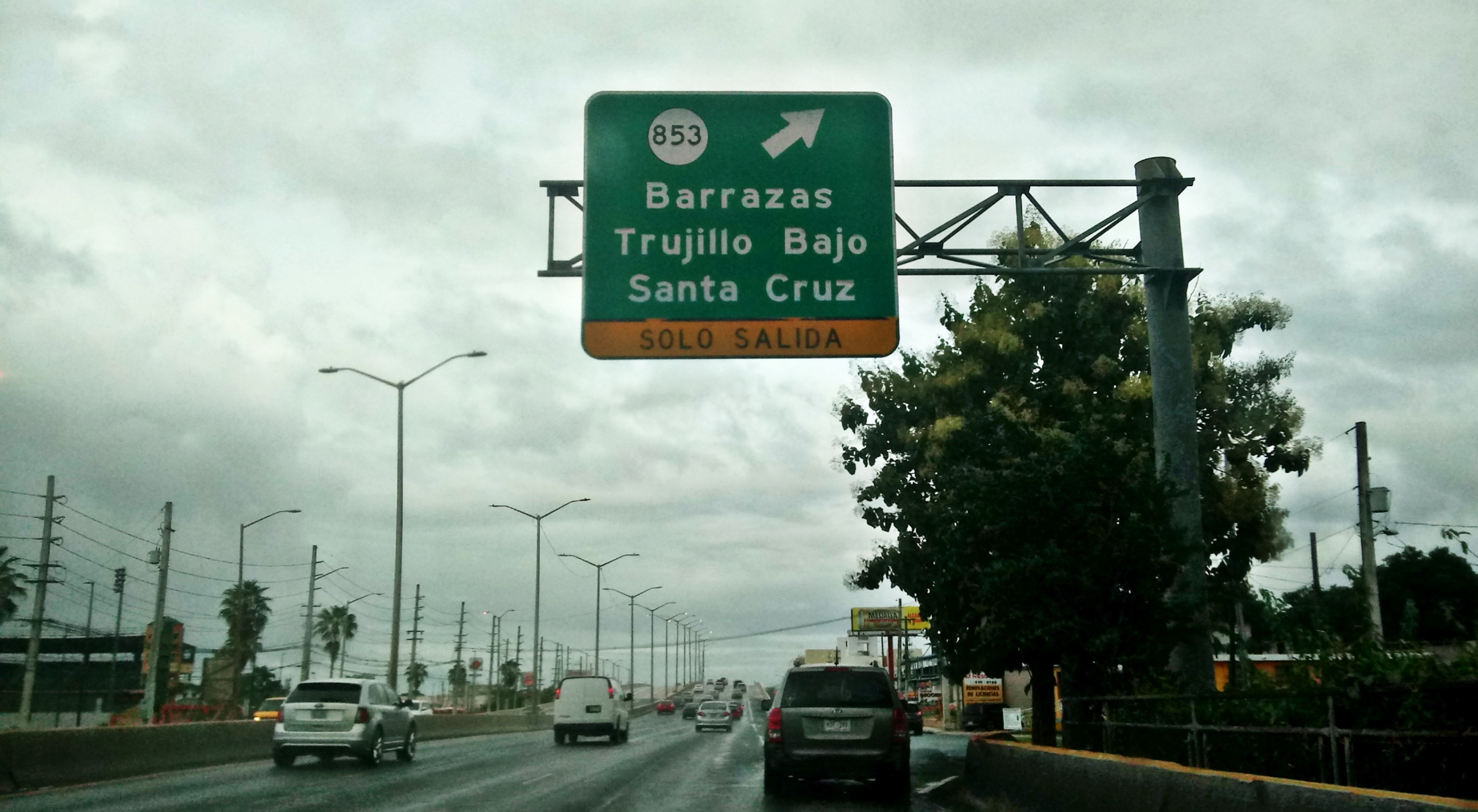
- Sign for Barrazas, Trujillo Bajo and Santa Cruz, barrios in Carolina

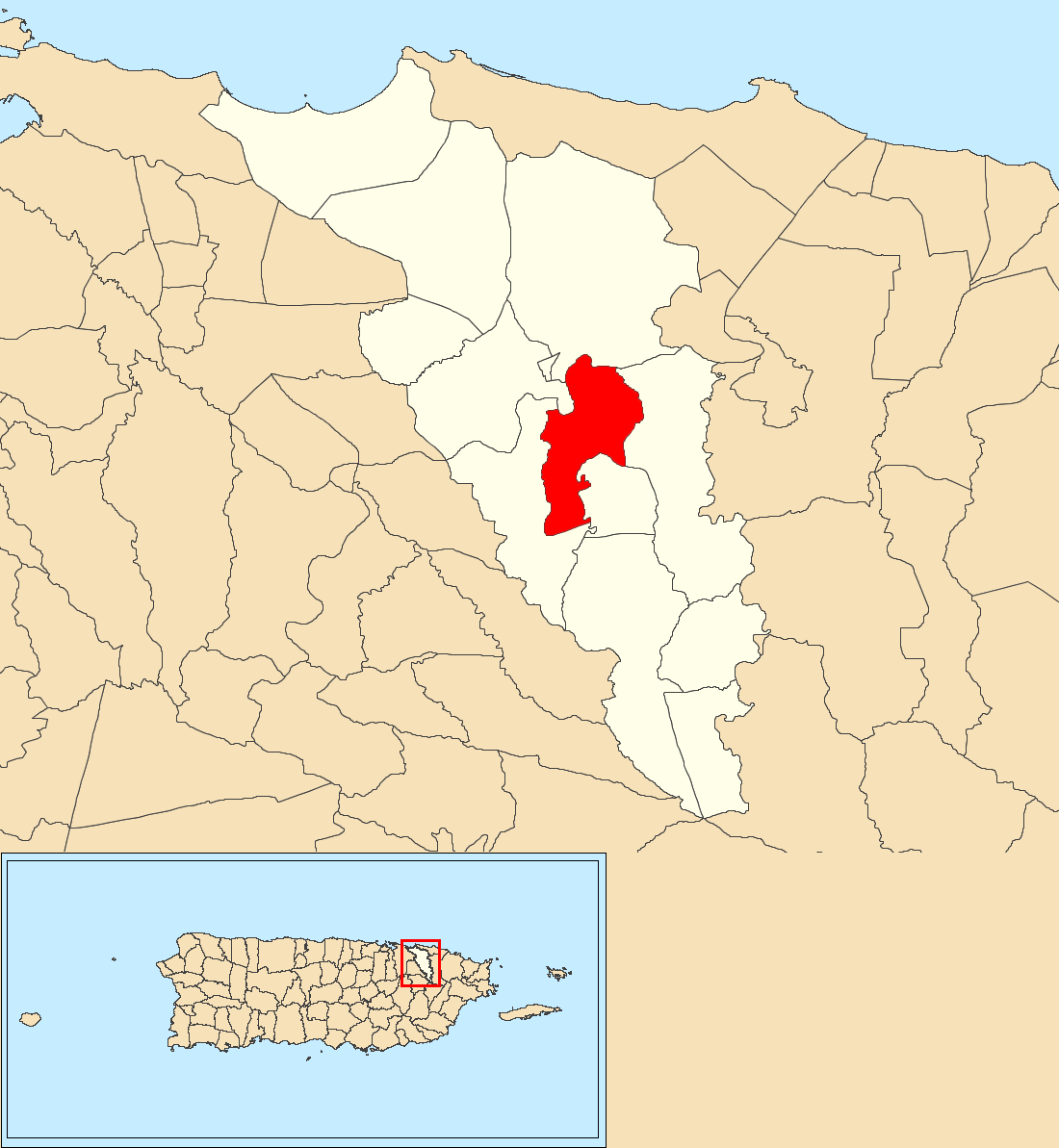
- Location of Trujillo Bajo within the municipality of Carolina shown in red

- Location of Puerto Rico
- Coordinates: 18°21′49″N 65°56′53″W
- Commonwealth: Puerto Rico
- Municipality: Carolina

Area
  - Total: 2.64 sq mi (6.8 km^{2})
  - Land: 2.60 sq mi (6.7 km^{2})
  - Water: 0.04 sq mi (0.10 km^{2})
- Elevation: 213 ft (65 m)

Population (2010)
  - Total: 8,805
  - Density: 3,399.6/sq mi (1,312.6/km^{2})
- Source: 2010 Census
- Time zone: UTC−4 (AST)

Trujillo Bajo is a barrio in the municipality of Carolina, Puerto Rico. Its population in 2010 was 8,805.

== History ==
The barrio was in Spain's gazetteers until Puerto Rico was ceded by Spain in the aftermath of the Spanish–American War under the terms of the Treaty of Paris of 1898 and became an unincorporated territory of the United States. In 1899, the United States Department of War conducted a census of Puerto Rico finding that the population of Trujillo Bajo barrio was 651.

Historical population
Census	Pop.	Note	%±
1900	651		—
1910	747		14.7%
1920	665		−11.0%
1930	785		18.0%
1940	947		20.6%
1950	1,257		32.7%
1960	2,700		114.8%
1970	3,350		24.1%
1980	6,381		90.5%
1990	8,123		27.3%
2000	9,808		20.7%
2010	8,805		−10.2%
U.S. Decennial Census; 1899 (shown as 1900) 1910-1930; 1930-1950 1980-2000 2010

== See also ==
- List of communities in Puerto Rico
