= Carruzos, Carolina, Puerto Rico =

Barrio of Puerto Rico

Carruzos
- Barrio
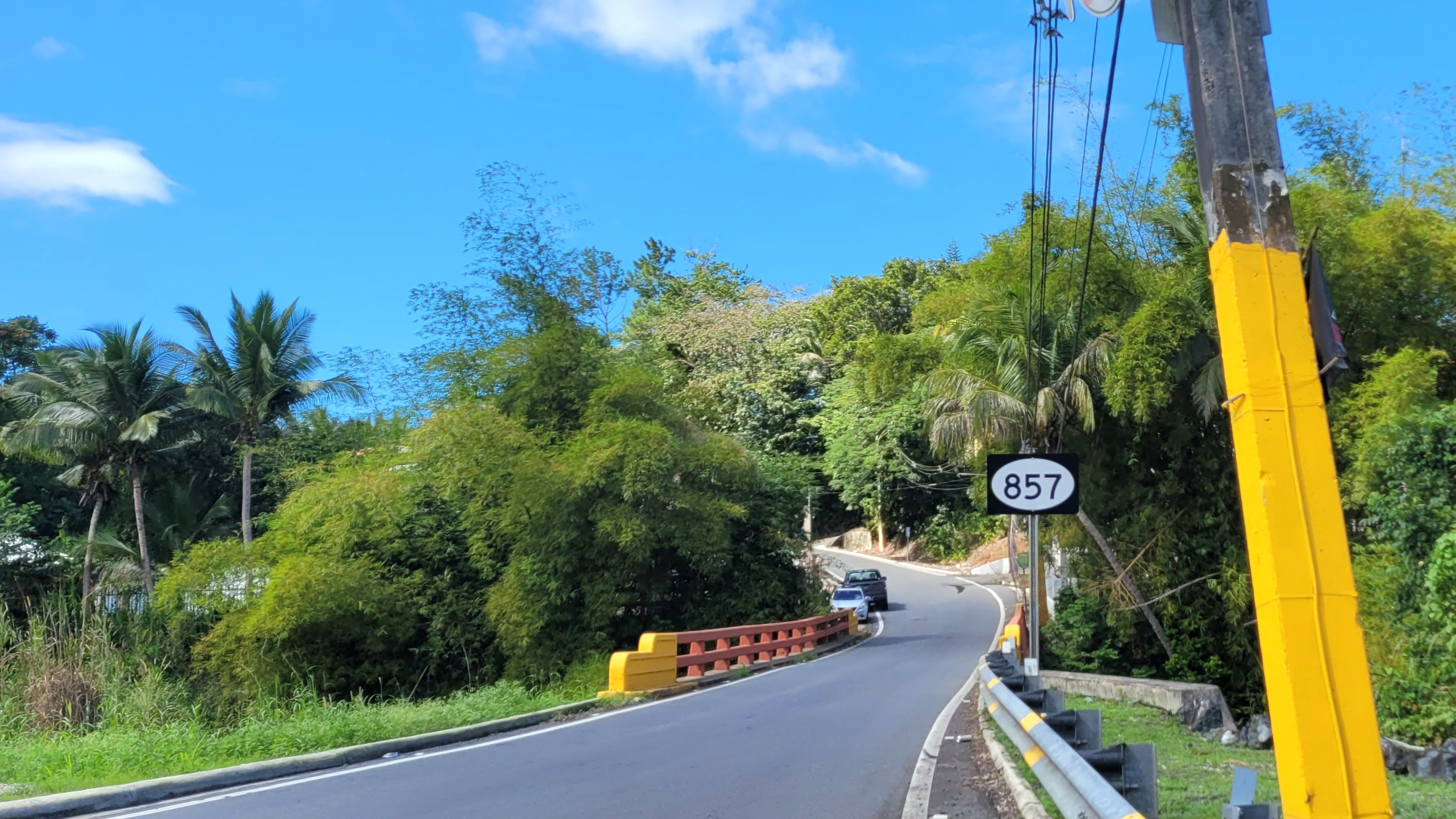
- Puerto Rico Highway 857 between Lomas and Carruzos

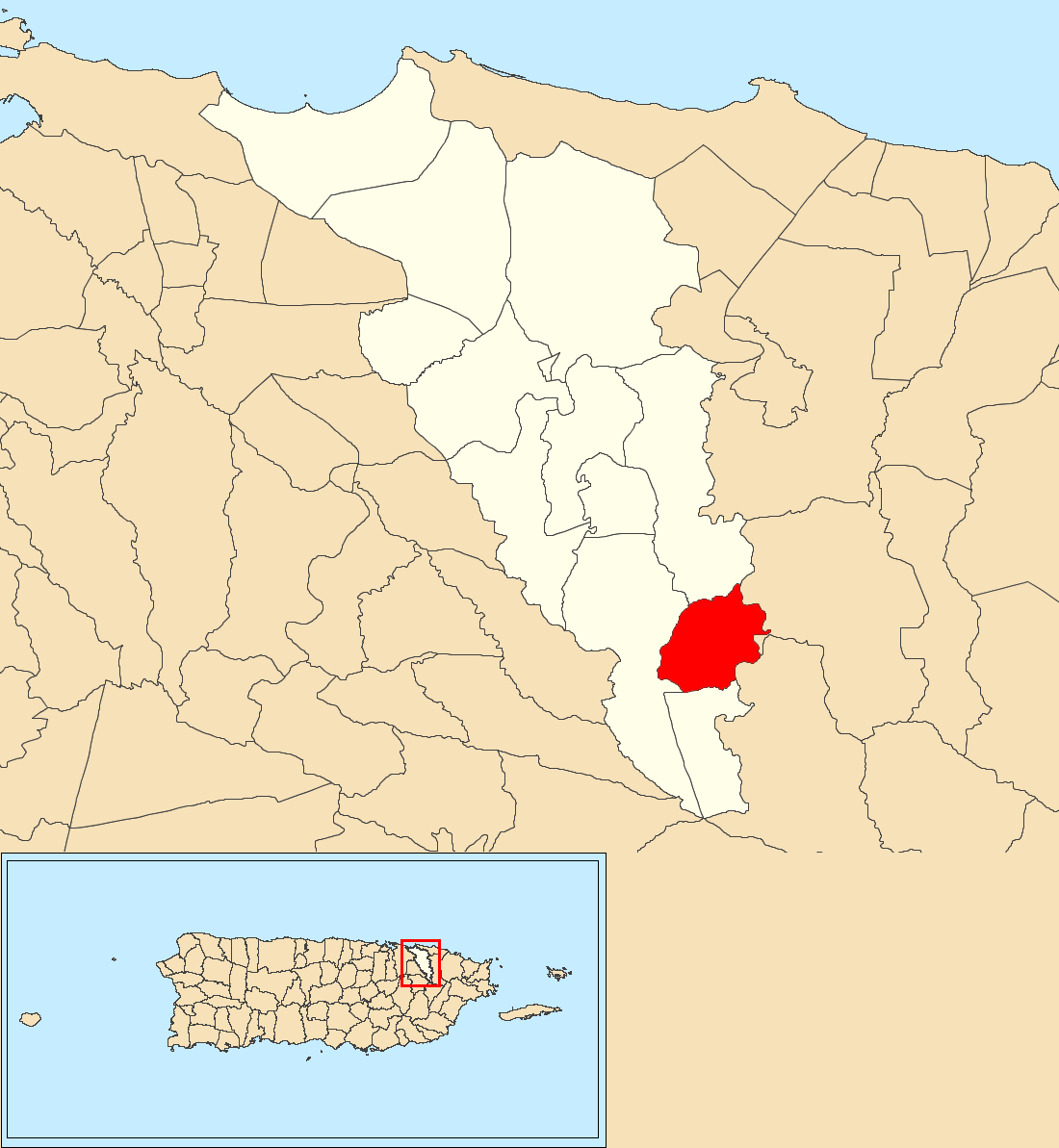
- Location of Carruzos within the municipality of Carolina shown in red

- Location of Puerto Rico
- Coordinates: 18°18′48″N 65°54′59″W
- Commonwealth: Puerto Rico
- Municipality: Carolina

Area
  - Total: 2.04 sq mi (5.3 km^{2})
  - Land: 2.04 sq mi (5.3 km^{2})
  - Water: 0 sq mi (0 km^{2})
- Elevation: 718 ft (219 m)

Population (2010)
  - Total: 2,506
  - Density: 1,228.4/sq mi (474.3/km^{2})
- Source: 2010 Census
- Time zone: UTC−4 (AST)

Carruzos is a barrio in the municipality of Carolina, Puerto Rico. Its population in 2010 was 2,506.

== History ==
Carruzos was in Spain's gazetteers until Puerto Rico was ceded by Spain in the aftermath of the Spanish–American War under the terms of the Treaty of Paris of 1898 and became an unincorporated territory of the United States. In 1899, the United States Department of War conducted a census of Puerto Rico finding that the population of Carruzos barrio was 637.

Historical population
| Census | Pop. | Note | %± |
|---|---|---|---|
| 1900 | 637 | | — |
| 1910 | 764 | | 19.9% |
| 1920 | 911 | | 19.2% |
| 1930 | 930 | | 2.1% |
| 1940 | 1,061 | | 14.1% |
| 1950 | 1,205 | | 13.6% |
| 1960 | 1,163 | | −3.5% |
| 1970 | 1,509 | | 29.8% |
| 1980 | 1,723 | | 14.2% |
| 1990 | 2,222 | | 29.0% |
| 2000 | 2,481 | | 11.7% |
| 2010 | 2,506 | | 1.0% |
U.S. Decennial Census; 1899 (shown as 1900) 1910-1930; 1930-1950 1980-2000 2010

== See also ==
- List of communities in Puerto Rico
