= Emanuel Jose Sanchez =

Puerto Rican jockey

Personal information
- Born: September 21, 1982 Carolina, Puerto Rico
- Died: July 23, 2005 (aged 22) Richmond, Virginia, U.S.
- Occupation: Jockey

Horse racing career
- Sport: Horse racing
- Career wins: 1

Major racing wins
- Race #7 at Colonial Downs on June 19, 2005

Significant horses
- Mark Me Special

Emanuel Jose Sanchez (September 21, 1982 – July 23, 2005) was a Puerto Rican jockey competing in American Thoroughbred horse racing.

Born in Carolina, Puerto Rico, Sanchez emigrated to the United States where he worked as an exercise rider at Bowie Training Center in Bowie, Maryland and had raced at other Thoroughbred racetracks. In the summer of 2005 he was working as an apprentice jockey at Colonial Downs racetrack in New Kent County, Virginia.

Like many jockeys, Emanuel Jose Sanchez struggled to maintain his weight to meet the requirements for racing. According to Christian Olmo, a fellow Puerto Rican jockey and close friend who grew up with Sanchez, he had no visions of grandeur but had a passion for riding horses. Sanchez won one race during his short career in the United States. Riding the mare Mark Me Special he captured the 7th race at Colonial Downs on June 19, 2005. According to The Washington Post, "Sanchez was so unsteady after crossing the finish line at Colonial Downs, he needed help guiding the horse into the winner's circle". On a hot Friday, July 22, shortly after riding a horse named Bear On Tour in the fourth race at Colonial Downs, Sanchez was found collapsed on the floor of the shower in the jockey's room. Rushed to Richmond Community Hospital in Richmond, Virginia, he died on Saturday morning from the effects of dehydration. His death as a result of dieting was the first of two in 2005. On November 12, Louisville, Kentucky jockey Chris Herrell also died as a result of crash dieting.

Emanuel Jose Sanchez's remains were returned to his native Puerto Rico for burial. According to friend Christian Olmo, he is survived by a 6-year-old daughter.
