= Cedro, Carolina, Puerto Rico =

Barrio of Puerto Rico

Cedro
- Barrio
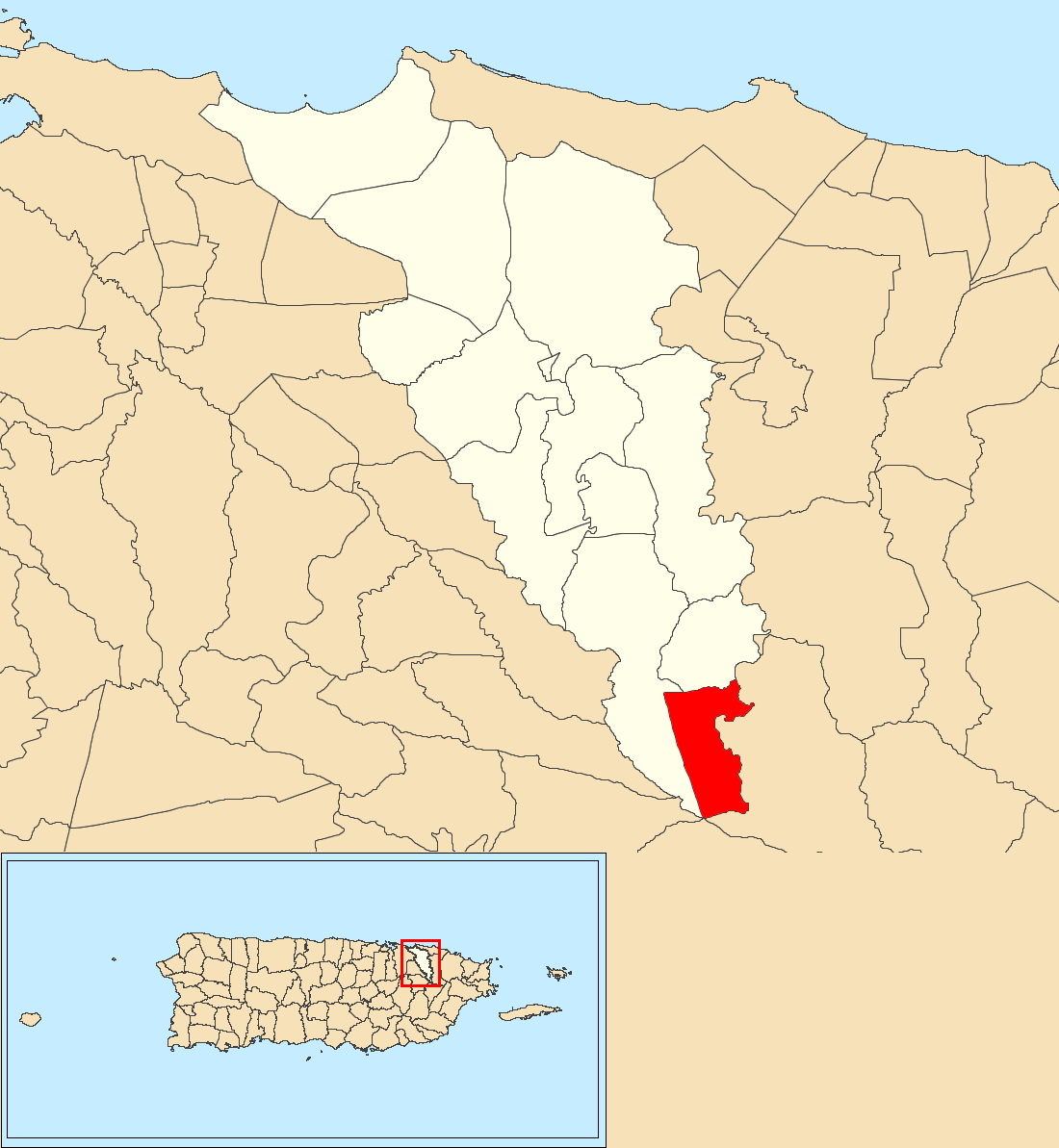
- Location of Cedro within the municipality of Carolina shown in red

- Location of Puerto Rico
- Coordinates: 18°17′16″N 65°55′02″W
- Commonwealth: Puerto Rico
- Municipality: Carolina

Area
  - Total: 1.9 sq mi (4.9 km^{2})
  - Land: 1.9 sq mi (4.9 km^{2})
  - Water: 0 sq mi (0 km^{2})
- Elevation: 545 ft (166 m)

Population (2010)
  - Total: 1,943
  - Density: 1,022.6/sq mi (394.8/km^{2})
- Source: 2010 Census
- Time zone: UTC−4 (AST)

Cedro is a barrio in the municipality of Carolina, Puerto Rico. Its population in 2010 was 1,943.

== History ==
Cedro was in Spain's gazetteers until Puerto Rico was ceded by Spain in the aftermath of the Spanish–American War under the terms of the Treaty of Paris of 1898 and became an unincorporated territory of the United States. In 1899, the United States Department of War conducted a census of Puerto Rico finding that the population of Cedros barrio (as it was named at the time) was 724.

Historical population
Census	Pop.	Note	%±
1900	724		—
1910	521		−28.0%
1920	510		−2.1%
1930	683		33.9%
1940	831		21.7%
1950	675		−18.8%
1960	773		14.5%
1970	862		11.5%
1980	1,318		52.9%
1990	1,633		23.9%
2000	1,918		17.5%
2010	1,943		1.3%
U.S. Decennial Census; 1899 (shown as 1900) 1910-1930; 1930-1950 1980-2000 2010

== See also ==
- List of communities in Puerto Rico
