= Sabana Abajo, Carolina, Puerto Rico =

Barrio of Puerto Rico

Sabana Abajo
- Barrio
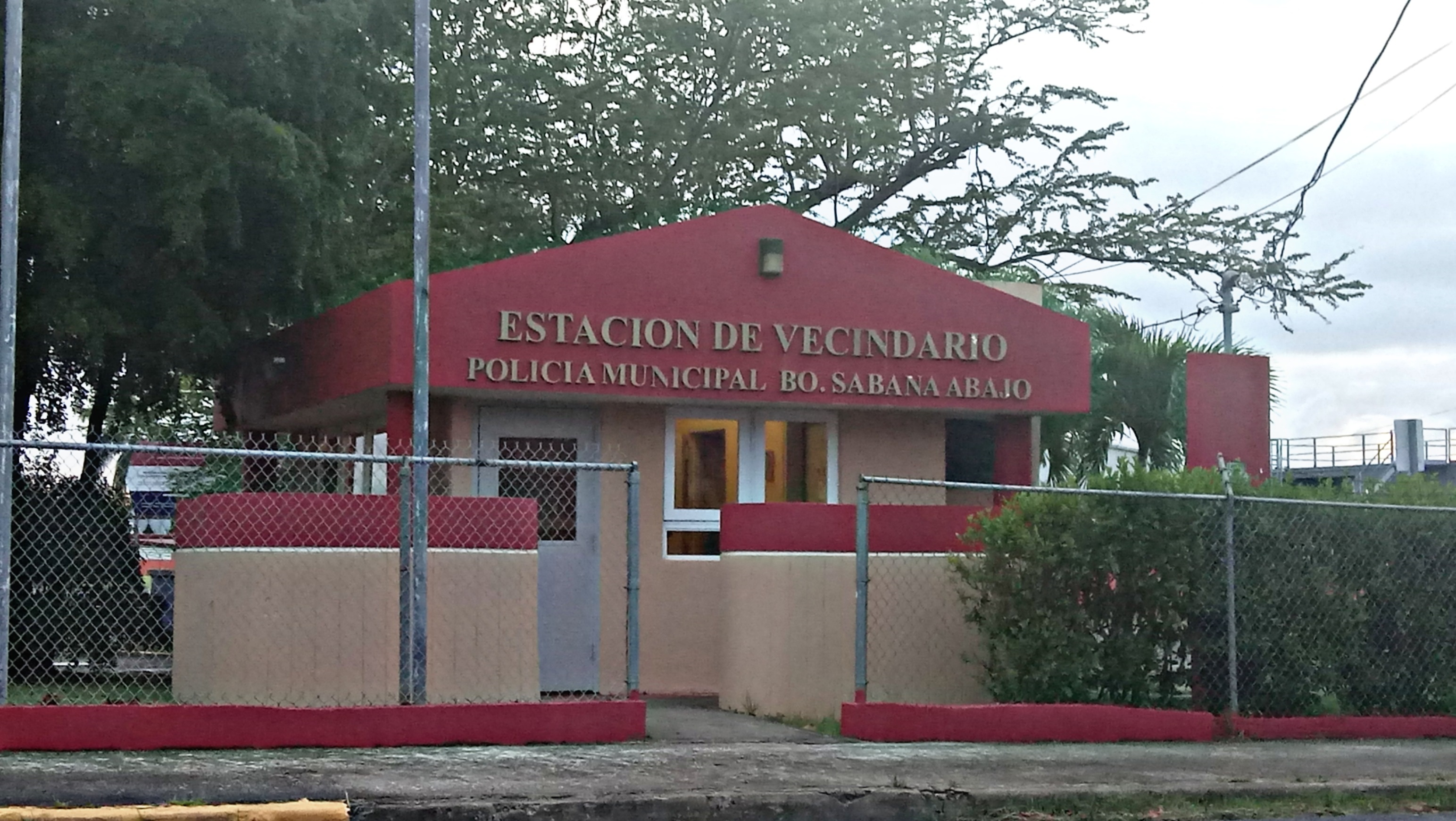
- Neighborhood police station in Sabana Abajo

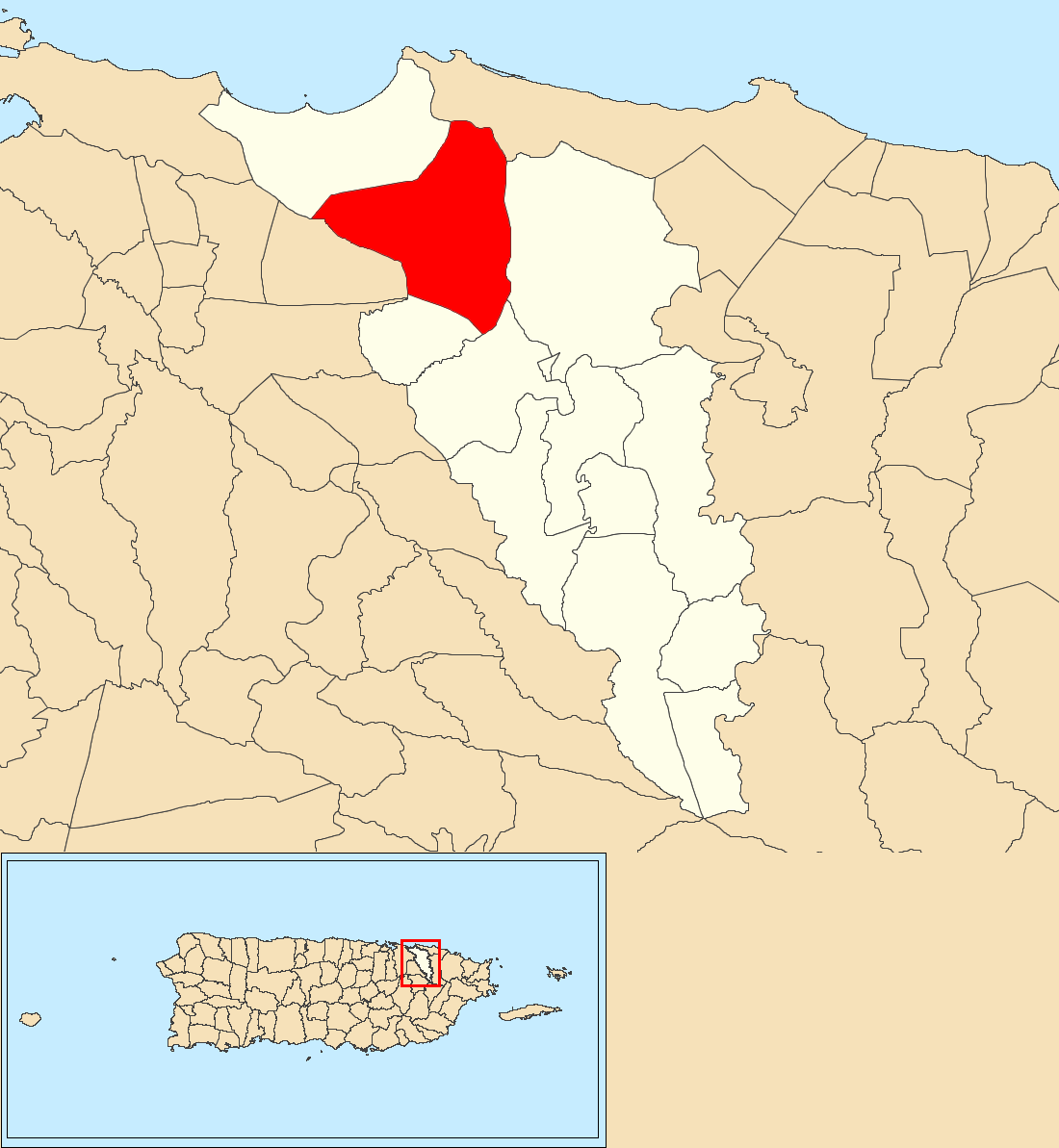
- Location of Sabana Abajo within the municipality of Carolina shown in red

- Location of Puerto Rico
- Coordinates: 18°25′02″N 65°58′53″W
- Commonwealth: Puerto Rico
- Municipality: Carolina

Area
  - Total: 6.00 sq mi (15.5 km^{2})
  - Land: 5.66 sq mi (14.7 km^{2})
  - Water: 0.34 sq mi (0.88 km^{2})
- Elevation: 13 ft (4.0 m)

Population (2010)
  - Total: 55,600
  - Density: 9,840.7/sq mi (3,799.5/km^{2})
- Source: 2010 Census
- Time zone: UTC−4 (AST)

Sabana Abajo is a barrio in the municipality of Carolina, Puerto Rico. Its population in 2010 was 55,600.

== History ==
Sabana Abajo was in Spain's gazetteers until Puerto Rico was ceded by Spain in the aftermath of the Spanish–American War under the terms of the Treaty of Paris of 1898 and became an unincorporated territory of the United States. In 1899, the United States Department of War conducted a census of Puerto Rico finding that the population of Sabana Abajo barrio was 578.

Historical population
Census	Pop.	Note	%±
1900	578		—
1910	878		51.9%
1920	894		1.8%
1930	1,445		61.6%
1940	1,724		19.3%
1950	4,584		165.9%
1960	9,270		102.2%
1970	0		−100.0%
1980	62,777		—
1990	62,559		−0.3%
2000	62,238		−0.5%
2010	55,600		−10.7%
U.S. Decennial Census; 1899 (shown as 1900) 1910-1930; 1930-1950 1980-2000 2010

== See also ==
- List of communities in Puerto Rico
