= Canovanillas, Carolina, Puerto Rico =

Barrio of Puerto Rico

Canovanillas
- Barrio
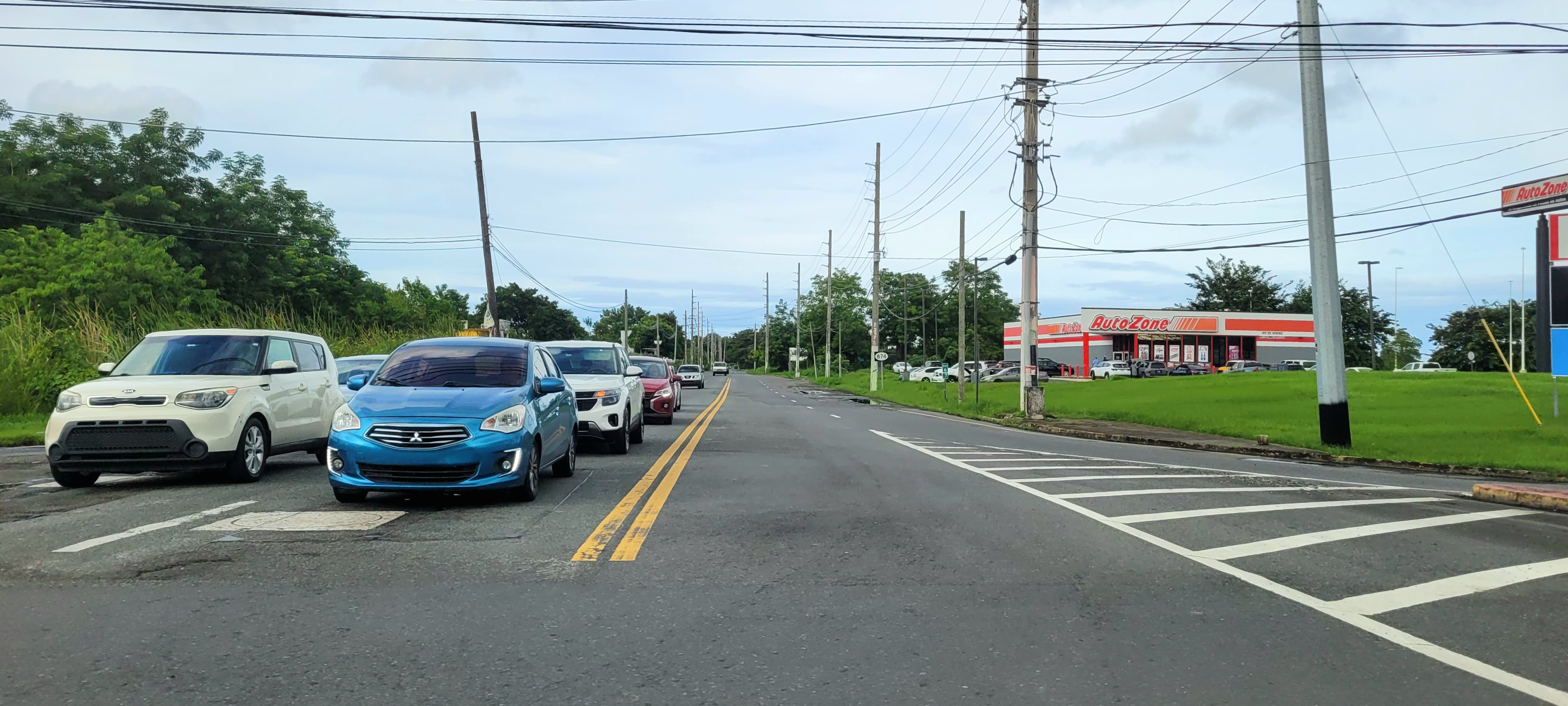
- Puerto Rico Highway 874 in Canovanillas

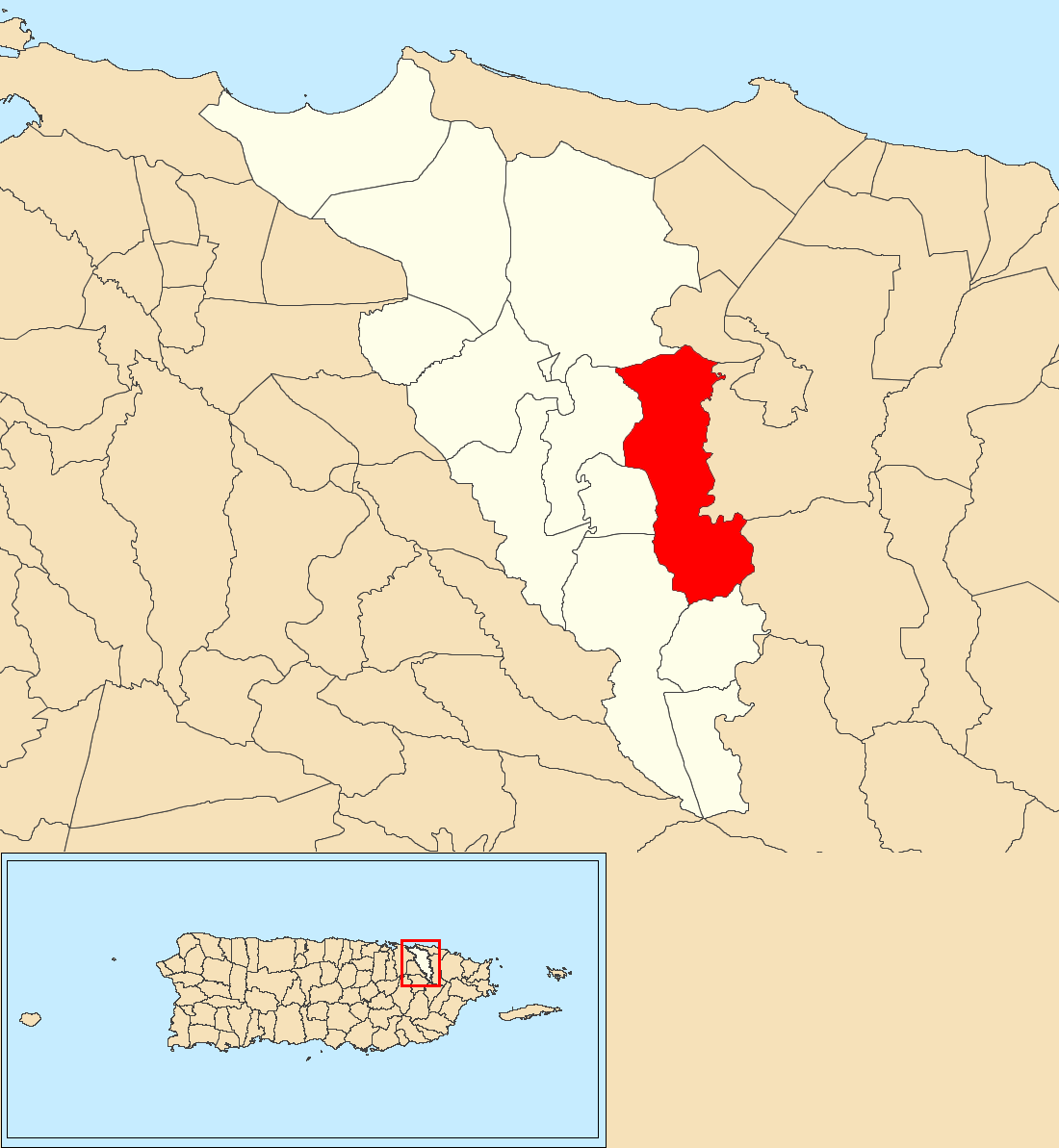
- Location of Canovanillas within the municipality of Carolina shown in red

- Location of Puerto Rico
- Coordinates: 18°21′22″N 65°55′13″W
- Commonwealth: Puerto Rico
- Municipality: Carolina

Area
  - Total: 5.01 sq mi (13.0 km^{2})
  - Land: 4.98 sq mi (12.9 km^{2})
  - Water: 0.03 sq mi (0.078 km^{2})
- Elevation: 328 ft (100 m)

Population (2010)
  - Total: 11,681
  - Density: 2,345.6/sq mi (905.6/km^{2})
- Source: 2010 Census
- Time zone: UTC−4 (AST)

Canovanillas is a barrio in the municipality of Carolina, Puerto Rico. Its population in 2010 was 11,681.

== History ==
Canovanillas was in Spain's gazetteers until Puerto Rico was ceded by Spain in the aftermath of the Spanish–American War under the terms of the Treaty of Paris of 1898 and became an unincorporated territory of the United States. In 1899, the United States Department of War conducted a census of Puerto Rico finding that the population of Canovanillas barrio was 950.

Historical population
Census	Pop.	Note	%±
1900	950		—
1910	1,745		83.7%
1920	1,759		0.8%
1930	1,815		3.2%
1940	2,188		20.6%
1950	1,784		−18.5%
1960	1,627		−8.8%
1970	2,178		33.9%
1980	5,066		132.6%
1990	7,312		44.3%
2000	10,748		47.0%
2010	11,681		8.7%
U.S. Decennial Census; 1899 (shown as 1900) 1910-1930; 1930-1950 1980-2000 2010

== See also ==
- List of communities in Puerto Rico
