= Cacao, Carolina, Puerto Rico =

Barrio of Puerto Rico

Cacao
- Barrio
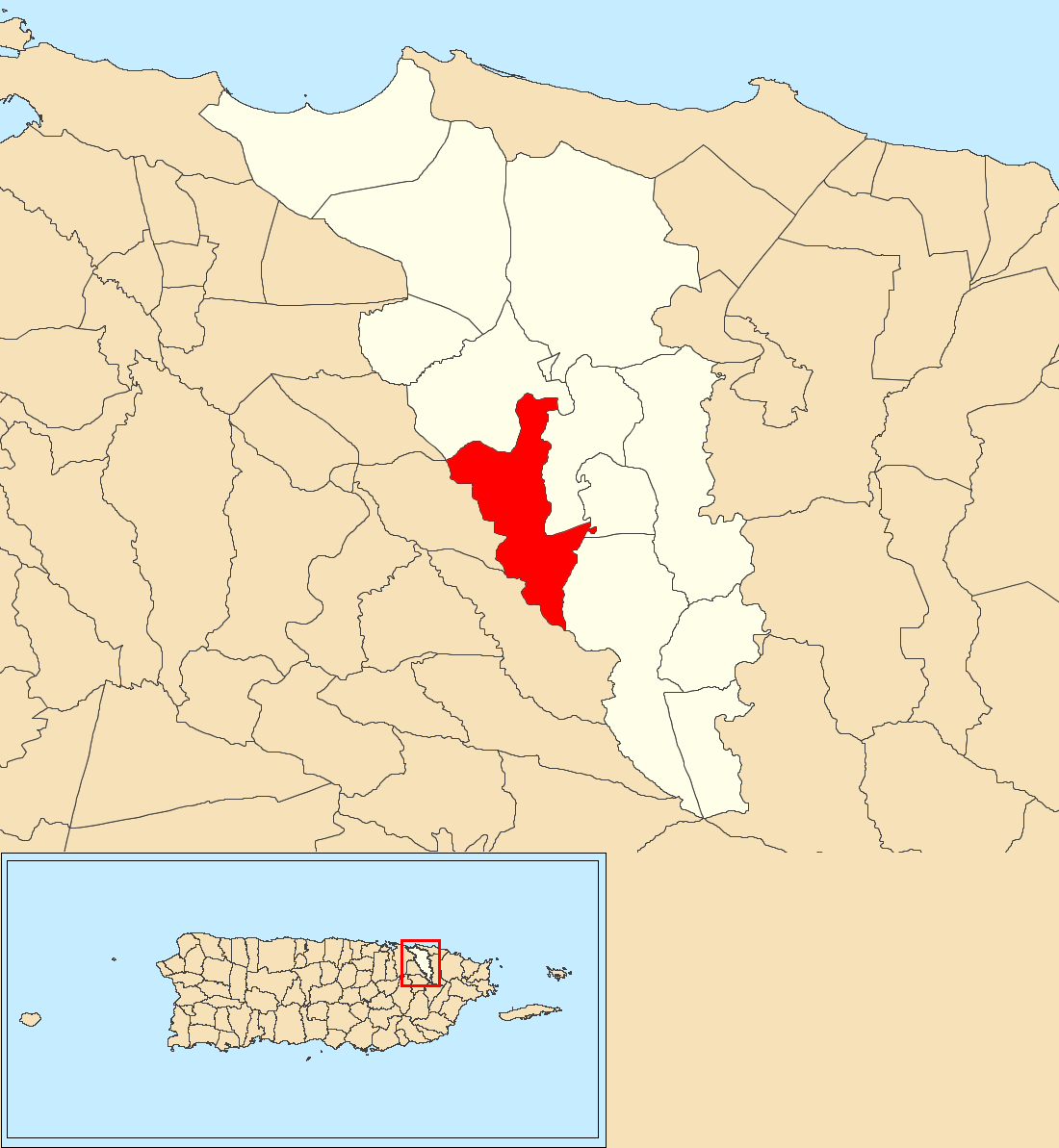
- Location of Cacao within the municipality of Carolina shown in red

- Location of Puerto Rico
- Coordinates: 18°20′37″N 65°57′37″W
- Commonwealth: Puerto Rico
- Municipality: Carolina

Area
  - Total: 3.60 sq mi (9.3 km^{2})
  - Land: 3.53 sq mi (9.1 km^{2})
  - Water: 0.07 sq mi (0.18 km^{2})
- Elevation: 420 ft (130 m)

Population (2010)
  - Total: 4,214
  - Density: 1,193.8/sq mi (460.9/km^{2})
- Source: 2010 Census
- Time zone: UTC−4 (AST)

Cacao is a barrio in the municipality of Carolina, Puerto Rico. Its population in 2010 was 4,214.

== History ==
Cacao was in Spain's gazetteers until Puerto Rico was ceded by Spain in the aftermath of the Spanish–American War under the terms of the Treaty of Paris of 1898 and became an unincorporated territory of the United States. In 1899, the United States Department of War conducted a census of Puerto Rico finding that the population of Cacao barrio was 1,225.

Historical population
Census	Pop.	Note	%±
1900	1,225		—
1910	1,535		25.3%
1920	1,664		8.4%
1930	1,712		2.9%
1940	1,586		−7.4%
1950	1,746		10.1%
1960	1,742		−0.2%
1970	1,884		8.2%
1980	2,706		43.6%
1990	3,287		21.5%
2000	3,668		11.6%
2010	4,214		14.9%
U.S. Decennial Census; 1899 (shown as 1900) 1910-1930; 1930-1950 1980-2000 2010

== See also ==
- List of communities in Puerto Rico
