= The Ritz-Carlton, San Juan =

Casino/Resort located in Isla Verde, Puerto Rico

- Interactive map of The Ritz-Carlton, San Juan
- Location: Isla Verde, Puerto Rico; 6961 Av of the Governors; 18°26′36.746″N 66°0′46.73″W
- No. of rooms: 416
- Owner: RCPR Acquisitions Holdings

The Ritz-Carlton, San Juan is a Ritz-Carlton Hotel & Casino that was built and opened in Isla Verde, Puerto Rico in 1997. It has 10 floors and 416 guestrooms. On-site amenities include beach access, a casino, a health club, a spa, two pools, tennis courts, and waterskis.

== Ownership & Renovations ==
The Ritz-Carlton San Juan was initially owned by Green Isle, who planned on doing renovations before declaring bankruptcy in May 2003. RECP San Juan Investors LLC, a subsidiary of Credit Suisse First Boston, took over.

Renovations were announced in June 2004, set to cost $13 million and take three years. By December it was up for sale again and the local government had to cover a $16.7 million loss on the hotel’s sale.

CPG Real Estate purchased the hotel and renovated the lobby, common spaces and rooms. They added balconies, oceanfront rooms and two restaurants: Il Mulino and BLT Steak. The guestrooms were renovated by Jeffrey Beers International in 2011. Upon realizing their goals, CPG sold the property to RCPR Acquisitions Holdings.

When Hurricane María hit Puerto Rico in 2017 The Ritz-Carlton San Juan suffered severe damage. $150 million was invested for repairs and renovations. As part of the renovation, Civic Construction of Puerto Rico, the general contractor and construction manager, subcontracted Quantum Vision Construction on July 17, 2023, to handle structural concrete work at various locations within the hotel. They allegedly failed to properly repair the damage, refused to provide proof of material purchases, failed to respond to concerns and failed to reimburse owed funds, resulting in a lawsuit. Reopening is set for some time in 2025, but an exact date has yet to be determined.
