= Buena Vista, Carolina, Puerto Rico =

Barrio of Puerto Rico

Buena Vista
- Barrio
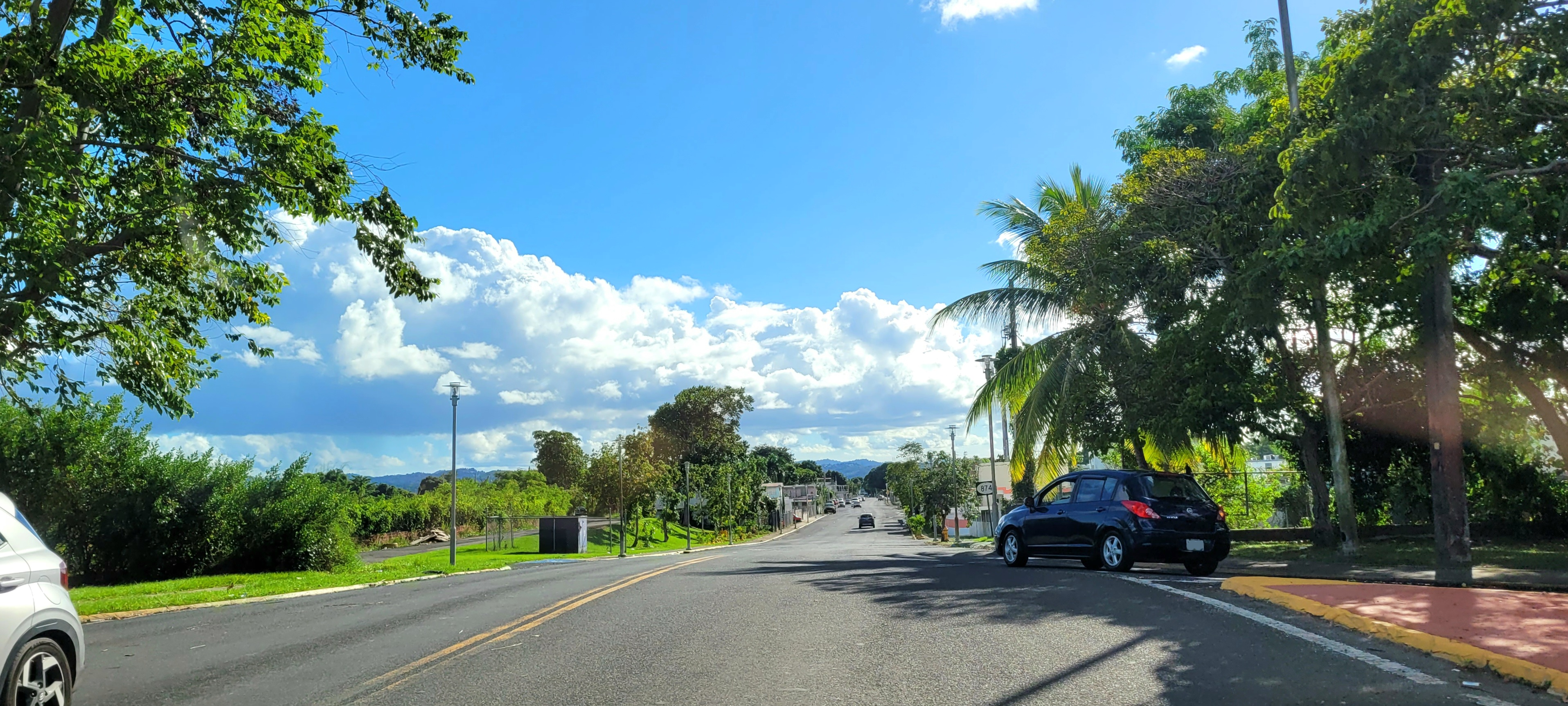
- Puerto Rico Highway 874 in Buena Vista

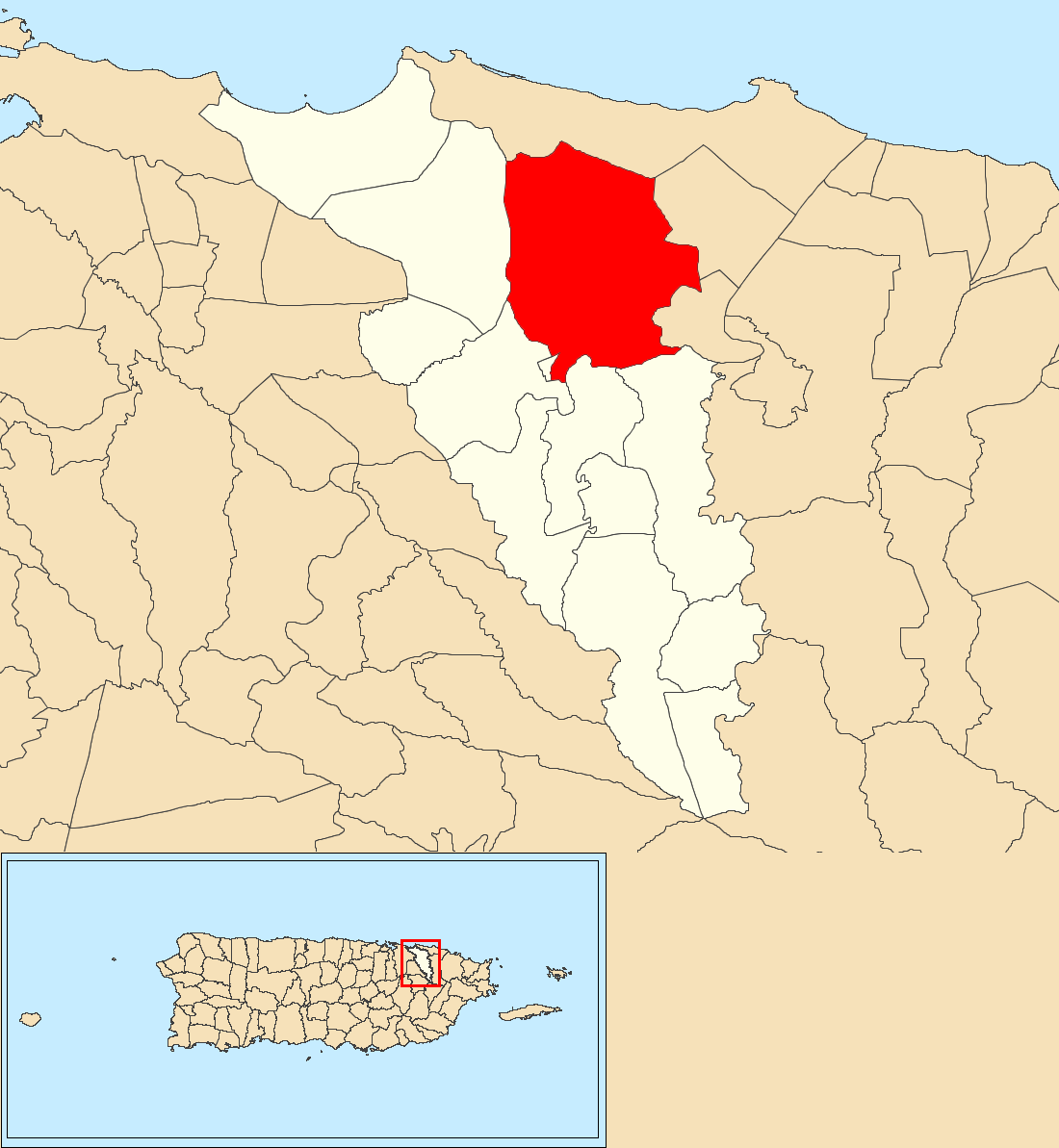
- Location of Buena Vista within the municipality of Carolina shown in red

- Location of Puerto Rico
- Coordinates: 18°24′39″N 65°56′53″W
- Commonwealth: Puerto Rico
- Municipality: Carolina

Area
  - Total: 8.79 sq mi (22.8 km^{2})
  - Land: 8.49 sq mi (22.0 km^{2})
  - Water: 0.30 sq mi (0.78 km^{2})
- Elevation: 23 ft (7.0 m)

Population (2010)
  - Total: 29,303
  - Density: 3,451.5/sq mi (1,332.6/km^{2})
- Source: 2010 Census
- Time zone: UTC−4 (AST)

Buena Vista (formerly known as Hoyo Mulas) is a barrio in the municipality of Carolina, Puerto Rico. Its population in 2010 was 29,303.

== History ==
Buena Vista was in Spain's gazetteers until Puerto Rico was ceded by Spain in the aftermath of the Spanish–American War under the terms of the Treaty of Paris of 1898 and became an unincorporated territory of the United States. In 1899, the United States Department of War conducted a census of Puerto Rico finding that the population of Hoyo Mulas (name changed in 2010) was 1245. The barrio's name was Hoyo Mulas until a name change was legislated, prior to the 2010 census.

Historical population
Census	Pop.	Note	%±
1900	1,245		—
1910	1,628		30.8%
1920	1,227		−24.6%
1930	1,034		−15.7%
1940	1,543		49.2%
1950	2,133		38.2%
1960	1,567		−26.5%
1970	0		−100.0%
1980	36,688		—
1990	34,314		−6.5%
2000	33,914		−1.2%
2010	29,303		−13.6%
U.S. Decennial Census; 1899 (shown as 1900) 1910-1930; 1930-1950 1980-2000 2010

== See also ==
- List of communities in Puerto Rico
