= Barrazas, Carolina, Puerto Rico =

Barrio of Puerto Rico

Barrazas
- Barrio
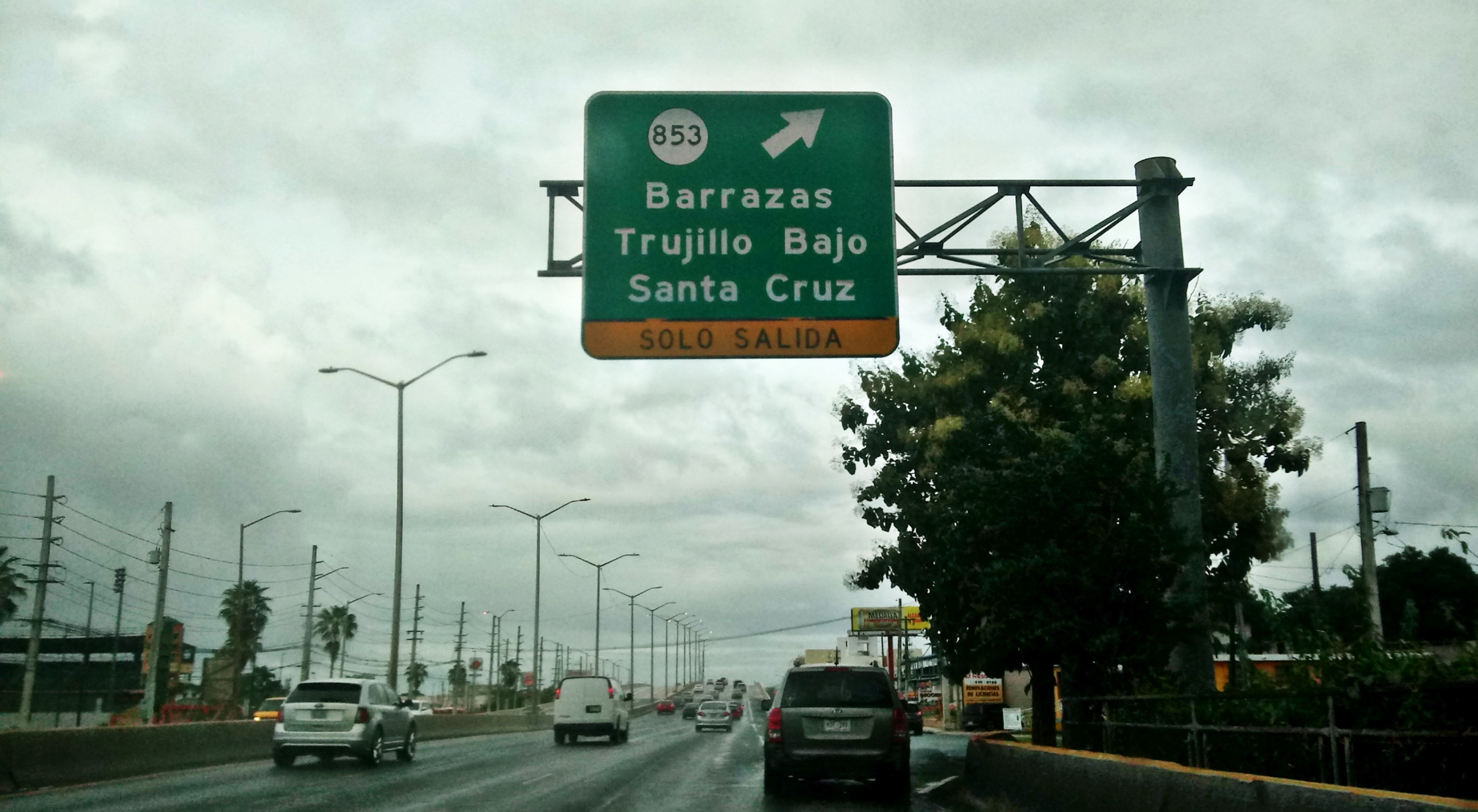
- Sign for Barrazas, Trujillo Bajo and Santa Cruz barrios in Carolina

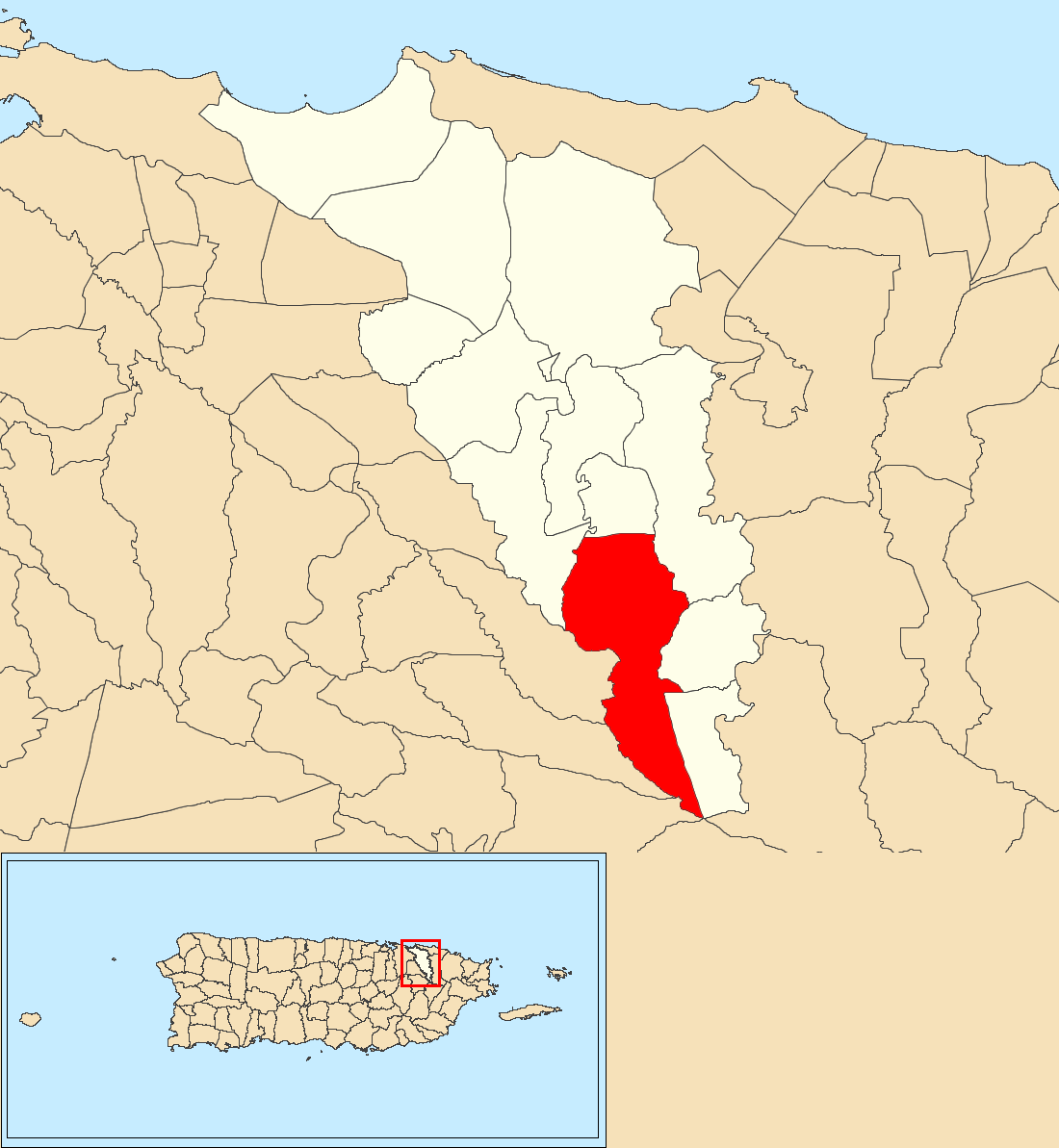
- Location of Barrazas within the municipality of Carolina shown in red

- Location of Puerto Rico
- Coordinates: 18°18′49″N 65°56′19″W
- Commonwealth: Puerto Rico
- Municipality: Carolina

Area
  - Total: 5.39 sq mi (14.0 km^{2})
  - Land: 5.38 sq mi (13.9 km^{2})
  - Water: 0.01 sq mi (0.026 km^{2})
- Elevation: 912 ft (278 m)

Population (2010)
  - Total: 4,301
  - Density: 800.9/sq mi (309.2/km^{2})
- Source: 2010 Census
- Time zone: UTC−4 (AST)

Barrazas is a barrio in the municipality of Carolina, Puerto Rico. Its population in 2010 was 4,301.

== History ==
Barrazas was in Spain's gazetteers until Puerto Rico was ceded by Spain in the aftermath of the Spanish–American War under the terms of the Treaty of Paris of 1898 and became an unincorporated territory of the United States. In 1899, the United States Department of War conducted a census of Puerto Rico finding that the population of Borrasa Bajo barrio was 764 and Borrasa Alta barrio was 889.

Historical population
Census	Pop.	Note	%±
1900	1,653		—
1910	1,706		3.2%
1920	1,807		5.9%
1930	1,996		10.5%
1940	2,123		6.4%
1950	1,936		−8.8%
1960	1,676		−13.4%
1970	1,614		−3.7%
1980	2,892		79.2%
1990	3,418		18.2%
2000	4,076		19.3%
2010	4,301		5.5%
U.S. Decennial Census; 1899 (shown as 1900) 1910-1930; 1930-1950 1980-2000 2010

== See also ==
- List of communities in Puerto Rico
