= Puerto Rico Highway 184 =

Highway in Puerto Rico

Highway 184
- Ruta 184

Route information
- Maintained by Puerto Rico DTPW
- Length: 33.4 km (20.8 mi)
- Existed: 1953–present

Major junctions
- South end: PR-3 in Cacao Bajo
- PR-755 in Cacao Bajo; PR-799 in Cacao Alto; PR-754 in Mulas; PR-762 in Quebrada Arriba; PR-7740 in Muñoz Rivera; PR-179 in Guavate; PR-763 in Guavate; PR-743 in Guavate; PR-7736 in Beatriz; PR-52 in Beatriz
- North end: PR-1 in Beatriz

Location
- Country: United States
- Territory: Puerto Rico
- Municipalities: Patillas, Guayama, Cayey, Cidra

Highway system
- Roads in Puerto Rico; List
← PR-183	→ PR-185

Puerto Rico Highway 184 (PR-184) is a main, rural highway that connects Patillas to Cayey, Puerto Rico, with plans to be extended to Cidra. It extends from PR-3 in Cacao Bajo to PR-1 in Beatriz.

== Route description ==
Sometimes referred to as Pork Highway, it is the main and only access to the various famous roasted-pork restaurants (lechoneras) in the area of Guavate and the access to the Carite State Forest. It borders the Guavate or Carite River, where several people swim often, and like Puerto Rico Highway 181, it borders the man-made Carite Lake, and it meets its end at Puerto Rico Highway 3. The main antennas of the local TV stations Telemundo, WAPA-TV and Univision can be seen from this road in La Santa. The road passes near a point where five municipalities share a border – Cayey, Patillas, San Lorenzo, Caguas and Guayama.

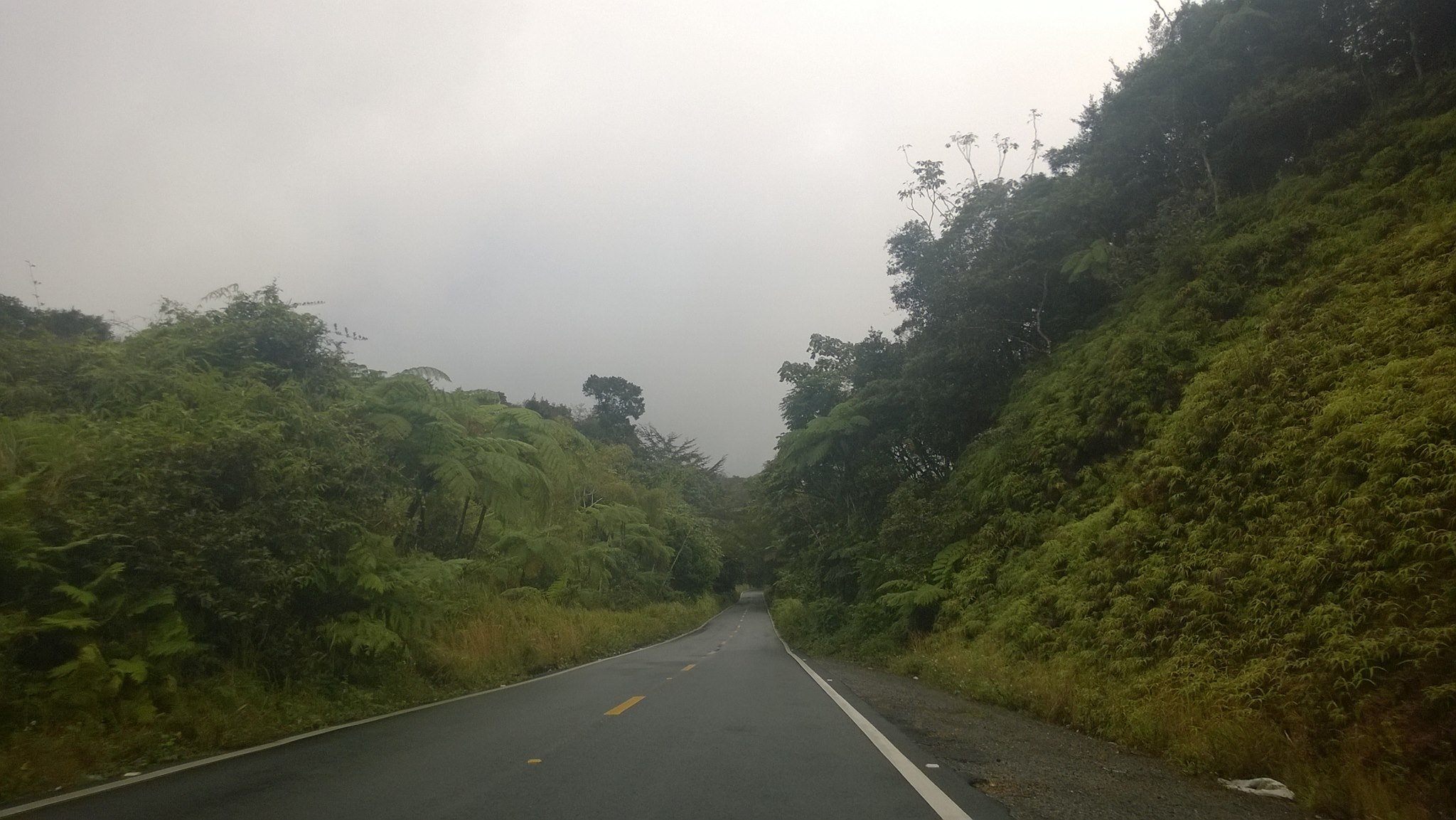
Puerto Rico Highway 184 south in Muñoz Rivera, Patillas

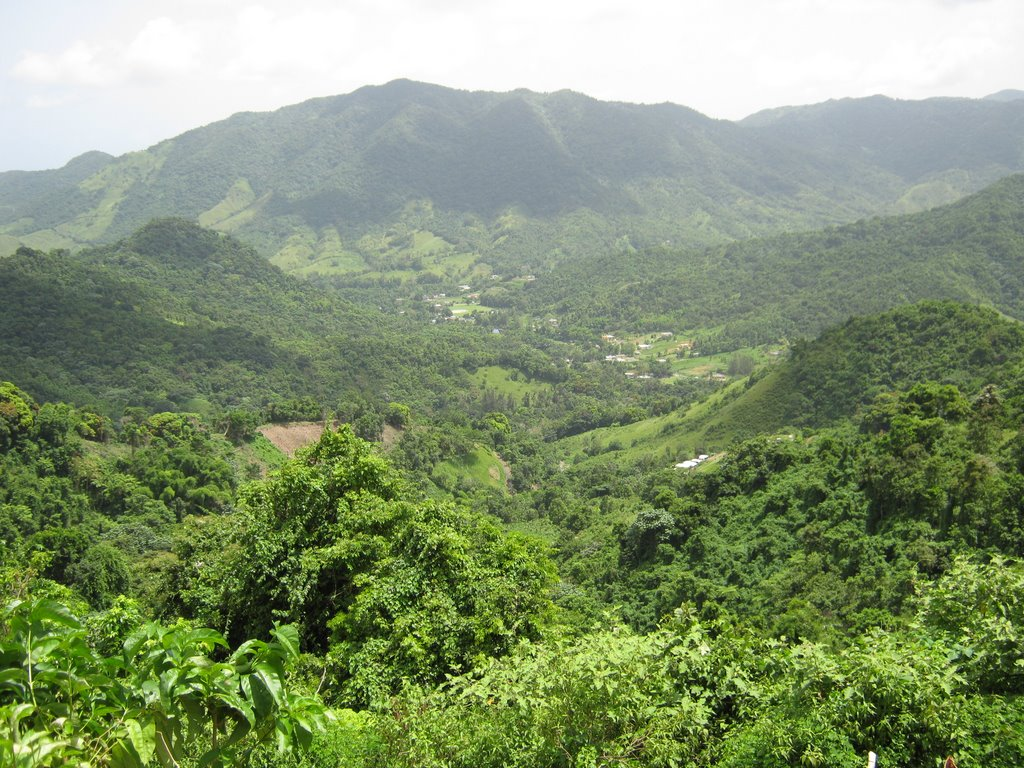
View from PR-184 in Muñoz Rivera, Patillas

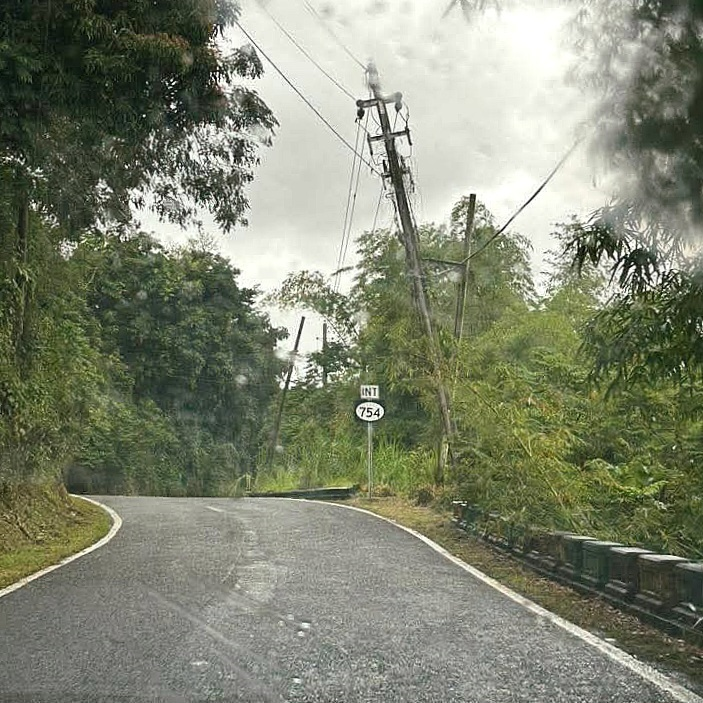
PR-184 north approaching PR-754 intersection in Mulas, Patillas

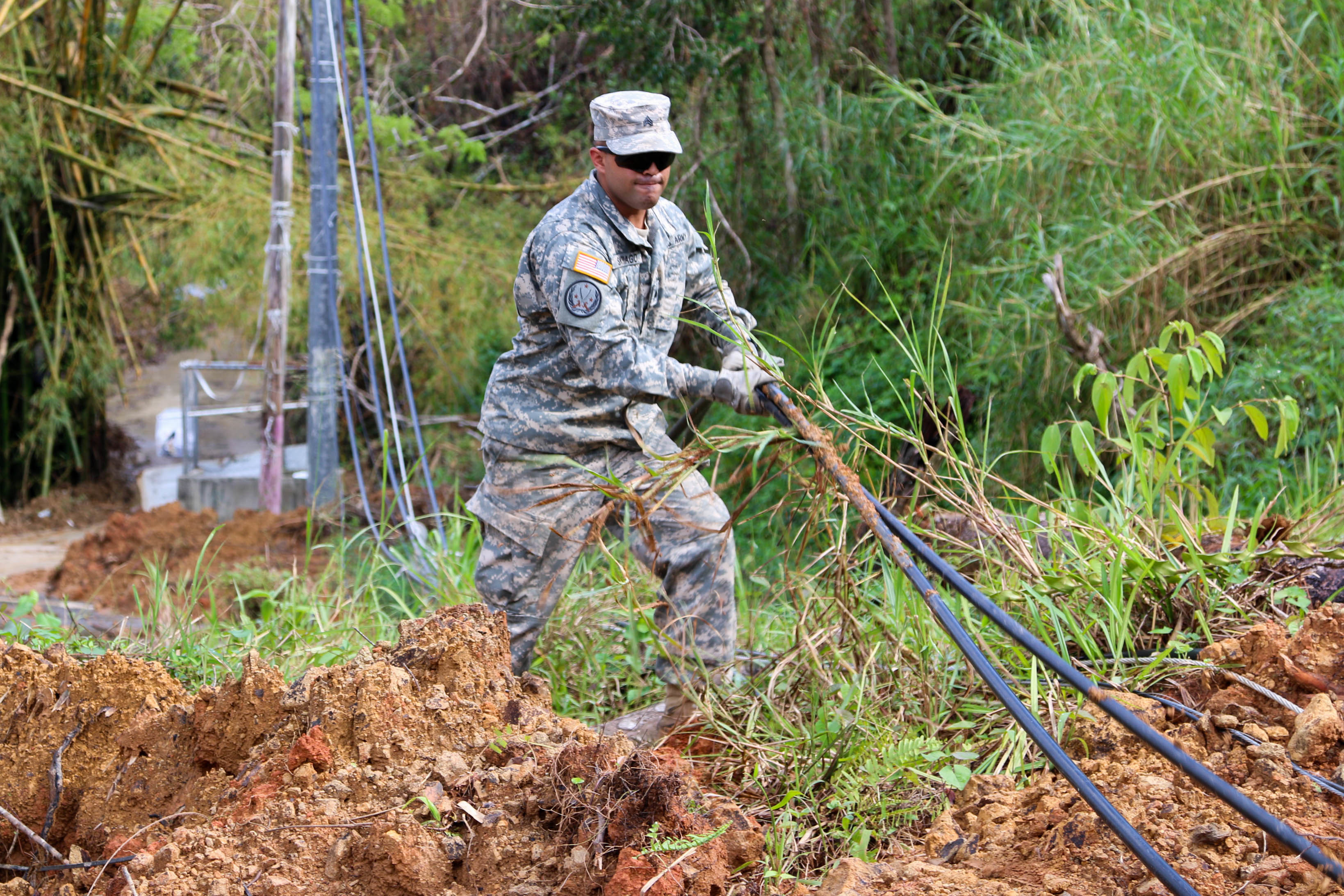
National Guard clearing trees from PR-184 after Hurricane Maria in 2017

== Major intersections ==
Municipality	Location	km	mi	Destinations	Notes
Patillas	Cacao Bajo	0.0	0.0	PR-3 – Patillas, Arroyo	Southern terminus of PR-184
Patillas	Cacao Bajo	1.1	0.68	PR-755 – Ancones	
Patillas	Cacao Alto	2.4– 2.5	1.5– 1.6	PR-799 – Patillas	
Patillas	Mulas	7.0	4.3	PR-754 – Mulas	
Patillas	Quebrada Arriba	9.9	6.2	PR-762 – Quebrada Arriba	
Patillas	Muñoz Rivera	19.3	12.0	PR-7740 (Ruta Panorámica) – San Lorenzo	Southern terminus of the Ruta Panorámica concurrency
Guayama	No major junctions				
Cayey	Guavate	24.2	15.0	PR-179 (Ruta Panorámica) – Guayama	Northern terminus of the Ruta Panorámica concurrency
Cayey	Guavate	27.5– 27.6	17.1– 17.1	PR-7184 – Guavate	Unsigned
Cayey	Guavate	27.8– 27.9	17.3– 17.3	PR-763 – Caguas	
Cayey	Guavate	30.8	19.1	PR-743 – Vegas	
Cayey	Beatriz	32.5	20.2	PR-7736 – Beatriz	
Cayey	Beatriz	33.1– 33.2	20.6– 20.6	PR-52 (Autopista Luis A. Ferré) – Caguas, San Juan, Ponce	PR-52 exit 32; diamond interchange
Cidra	Beatriz	33.4	20.8	PR-1 – Cayey, Cidra, Caguas	Northern terminus of PR-184
1.000 mi = 1.609 km; 1.000 km = 0.621 mi: Concurrency terminus

== See also ==
- 1953 Puerto Rico highway renumbering
