= Carite =

Carite may refer to:

- Carites, a people mentioned in the Bible
- Carite, Guayama, Puerto Rico, barrio in Puerto Rico
- Carite Lake in Puerto Rico
- Carite State Forest in Puerto Rico
- ARV Carite (S-11), a Venezuela submarine
- Cero (fish), also called carite
