= Carite State Forest =

Forest in southeastern Puerto Rico

Carite State Forest Spanish: Bosque Estatal de Carite
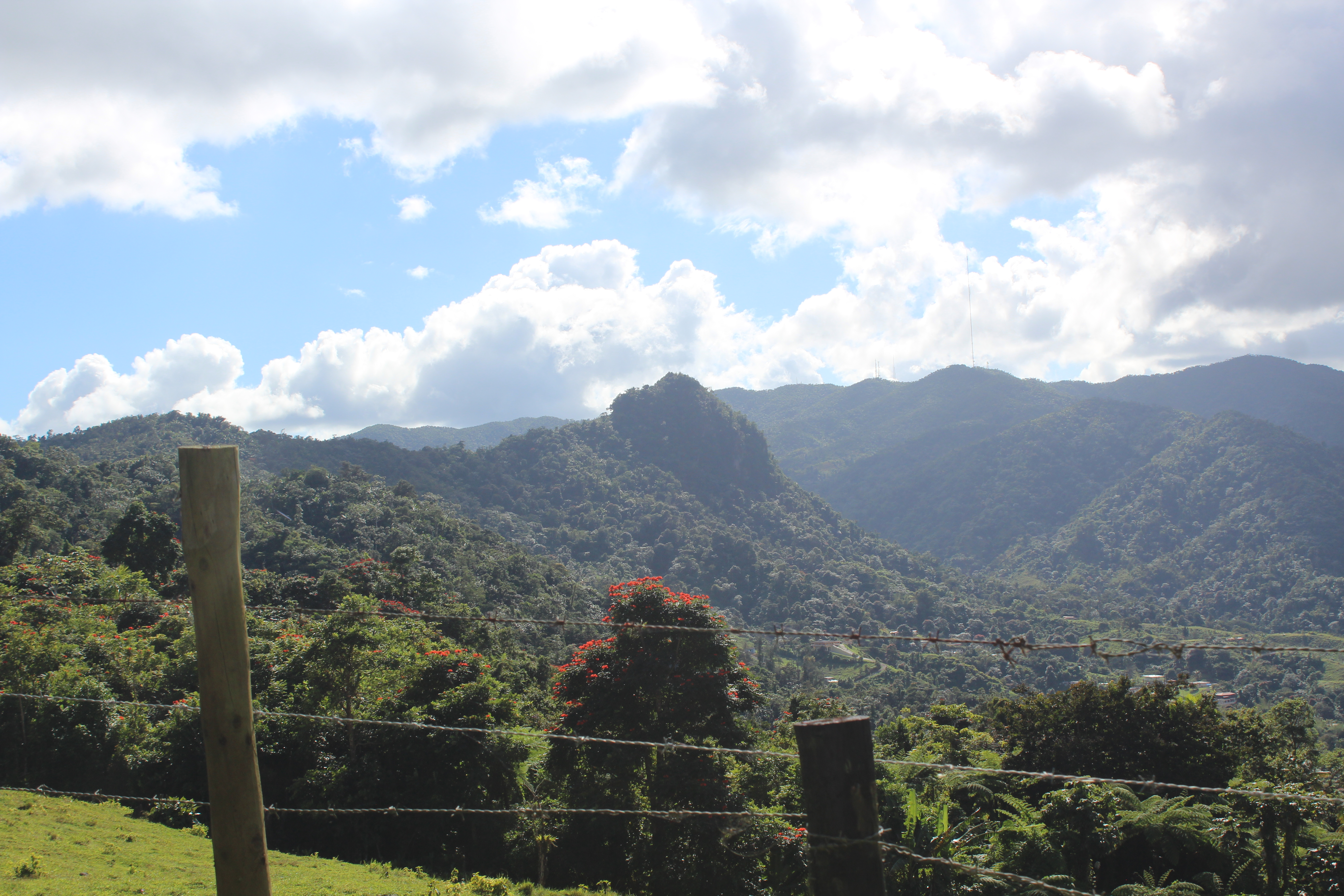
- Carite State Forest from Borinquen, Caguas

Geography
- Location: Caguas, Cayey, Guayama, Patillas, San Lorenzo
- Coordinates: 18°06′21″N 66°03′06″W
- Elevation: 2,962 feet (903 m)
- Area: 6,700 cuerdas (6,500 acres)

Administration
- Status: Public, Commonwealth
- Governing body: Puerto Rico Department of Natural and Environmental Resources (DRNA)
- Website: www.drna.gobierno.pr

Ecology
- WWF Classification: Puerto Rican moist forests

Carite State Forest (Spanish: Bosque Estatal de Carite) is a state forest and nature reserve located in the Sierra de Cayey mountain range in southeastern Puerto Rico. The forest extends over approximately 2,600 hectares (6,500 acres) and is located in the municipalities of Caguas, Cayey, Guayama, Patillas and San Lorenzo. The forest is located along the Ruta Panorámica (officially the Luis Muñoz Marín Scenic Route), which offers access to the forest.

== History ==
Carite State Forest is one of 20 forestry units in the territory of Puerto Rico. This forest area was established by a proclamation in 1935 and was formerly listed as a state forest on July 1, 1975, through the Law of Puerto Rican Forests (Law Num. 133). The area was preserved with the intention of developing it for its timber industry. The state forest was established with the goal of protecting the hydrological basins of the Loíza, Patillas and La Plata rivers which were being affected by erosion caused by deforestation throughout the 20th century. In more recent times the forest has become an important wildlife preserve, ecological research site and recreational area.

== Geography ==
This forest is located within the Sierra de Cayey mountain range. This range belongs to the larger Cordillera Central which extends through Puerto Rico from west to east. The highest point of the Sierra at 2,962 feet (903 m) in elevation, Cerro La Santa (Spanish for peak of the saint or peak of the holy woman), is located within the forest in the municipalities of Caguas, Cayey and San Lorenzo. This is the highest point in those three municipalities.

=== Geology ===
The mountains in the Carite Forest are of volcanic origin. The underlying rocks in the area located between the surface of the forest and depths of 3 kilometres (1.9 mi) were created as a result of volcanic activity that took place during the Early Cretaceous period between 79 and 144 million years ago. About 13 types of soil can be found within the forest region.

=== Climate ===
The climate of the forest is humid and cool; the most humid time of the year is between the months of May and October, analogous to the wet season of the island and the region's hurricane season. The average annual temperature is of 22 °C (72 °F) and the average annual precipitation measurement is 2,200 millimetres (85 in).

== Ecology and conservation ==
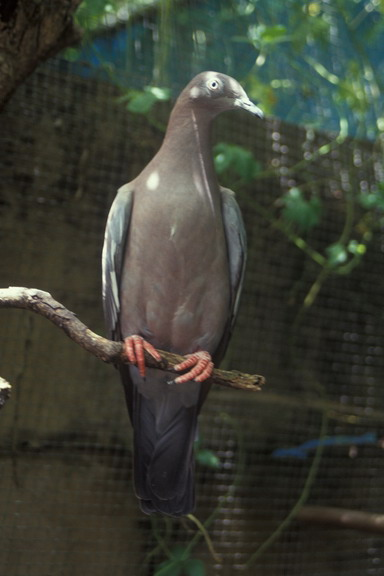
The Puerto Rican plain pigeon or paloma sabanera is endemic to the island and populous in the region.

=== Fauna ===
The forest is an important wildlife refuge and is home to 49 species of birds (9 of which are endemic), 15 species of amphibians, 12 species of reptiles and 7 species of mammals. About 9 species of animals that live in the forest are listed as endangered or threatened species, some of which are the Puerto Rican broad-winged hawk (Buteo platypterus brunnescens), the Puerto Rican sharp-shinned hawk (Accipiter striatus venator), the elfin woods warbler (Setophaga angelae), Eneida's coquí (Eleutherodactylus eneidae), the web-footed coqui (Eleutherodactylus karlschmidti), the Puerto Rican rock frog or coquí guajón (Eleutherodactylus cooki), and the Puerto Rican boa (Chilabothrus inornatus).

The area is renowned for its population of Puerto Rican plain pigeons or paloma sabanera (Patagioenas inornata wetmorei) which were formerly on the brink of extinction but were saved thanks to conservation efforts and is now considered stable. The golden coquí (Eleutherodactylus jasperi) used to be found in this forest but no specimens have been found in recent years and the species is now considered extinct.

Before their extirpation from most of Puerto Rico, the Carite area was a common habitat for the now critically endangered Puerto Rican parrot (Amazona vittata) until the first half of the 20th century. The Carite forest, together with the nearby Carite Lake in Guayama, has been recognized as an Important Bird Area by BirdLife International since 2004 due to its importance as a protected habitat for endemic and native bird populations.

=== Flora ===
Carite is home to more than 204 species of trees out of which 176 species are native. There are 43 endemic species of plants such as the Puerto Rican magnolia (Magnolia portoricensis) and the Puerto Rican raintree (Brunfelsia portoricensis). The forest is also home to the Luquillo Mountain stopper or uvillo (Eugenia haematocarpa), an endangered myrtle which can only be found in El Yunque National Forest and Carite State Forest.

The forest's vegetation can be classified into three ecological zones: the subtropical moist forest of Sierra palm trees which comprises 9% of the forest, the very humid subtropical moist forest which comprises more than 98% of the forest area and is home to the elfin or dwarf forest, and the low montane humid forest which only comprises about 0.5% of the forest area and is home to the palo colorado (Cyrilla racemiflora).

== Recreation ==
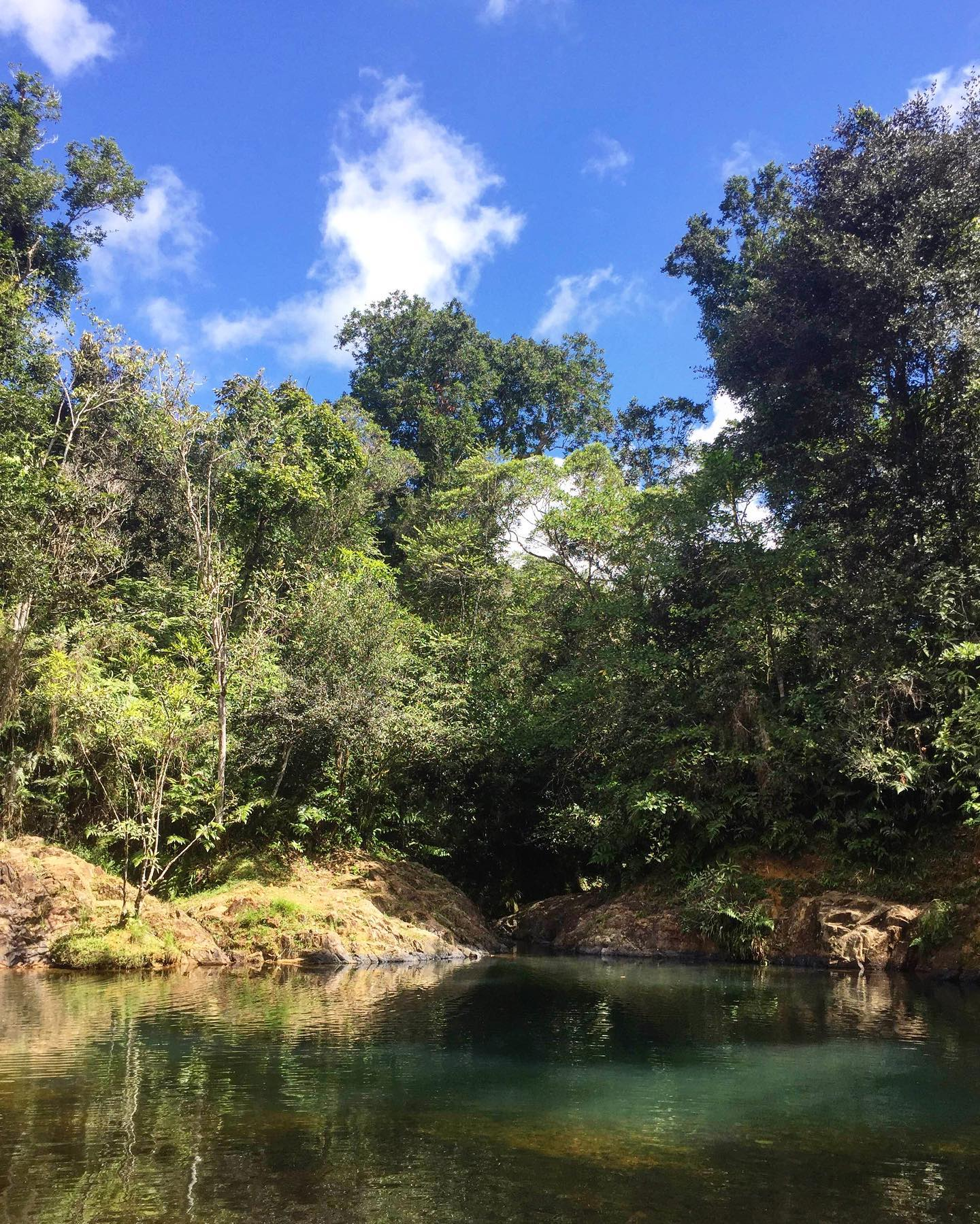
Charco Azul in 2015.

Recreation in the forest is managed by the Puerto Rico Department of Natural and Environmental Resources (DRNA). There are opportunities of camping, picnics and swimming. There used to be up to 25 hiking trails in the forest area; however, many of the trails have not been properly maintained, and some have never been reopened after being completely destroyed by hurricanes such as Georges and Maria. The only currently maintained trail is the Charco Azul Trail which leads to the Charco Azul swimming area.

=== Camping and picnic areas ===
The DRNA offices are open Monday to Friday from 7 a.m. to 3:30 p.m. The recreation areas are open from about 9 a.m. to 5 p.m. Most of the areas designated for camping and picnics are located uphill from Guavate in Cayey (in the past, the forest has also been referred to as the Guavate Forest) close to the famous lechoneras. The picnic area close to the Guavate lechoneras have not been opened after being destroyed by Hurricane Maria and the only maintained picnic area is located in the Charco Azul section of the forest. As of 2020, camping areas have not yet reopened after the destruction caused by the hurricane.

=== Charco Azul ===
Charco Azul (Spanish for blue pool), located in the municipality of Patillas, is one of the main highlights of the state forest. This is a clear, blue-colored natural pool formed by the Charco Azul river falls, which flow into the Patillas River. The area, located along PR-184, offers sites for picnics, camping, showers, and restrooms for people who wish to swim in it.

== Gallery ==
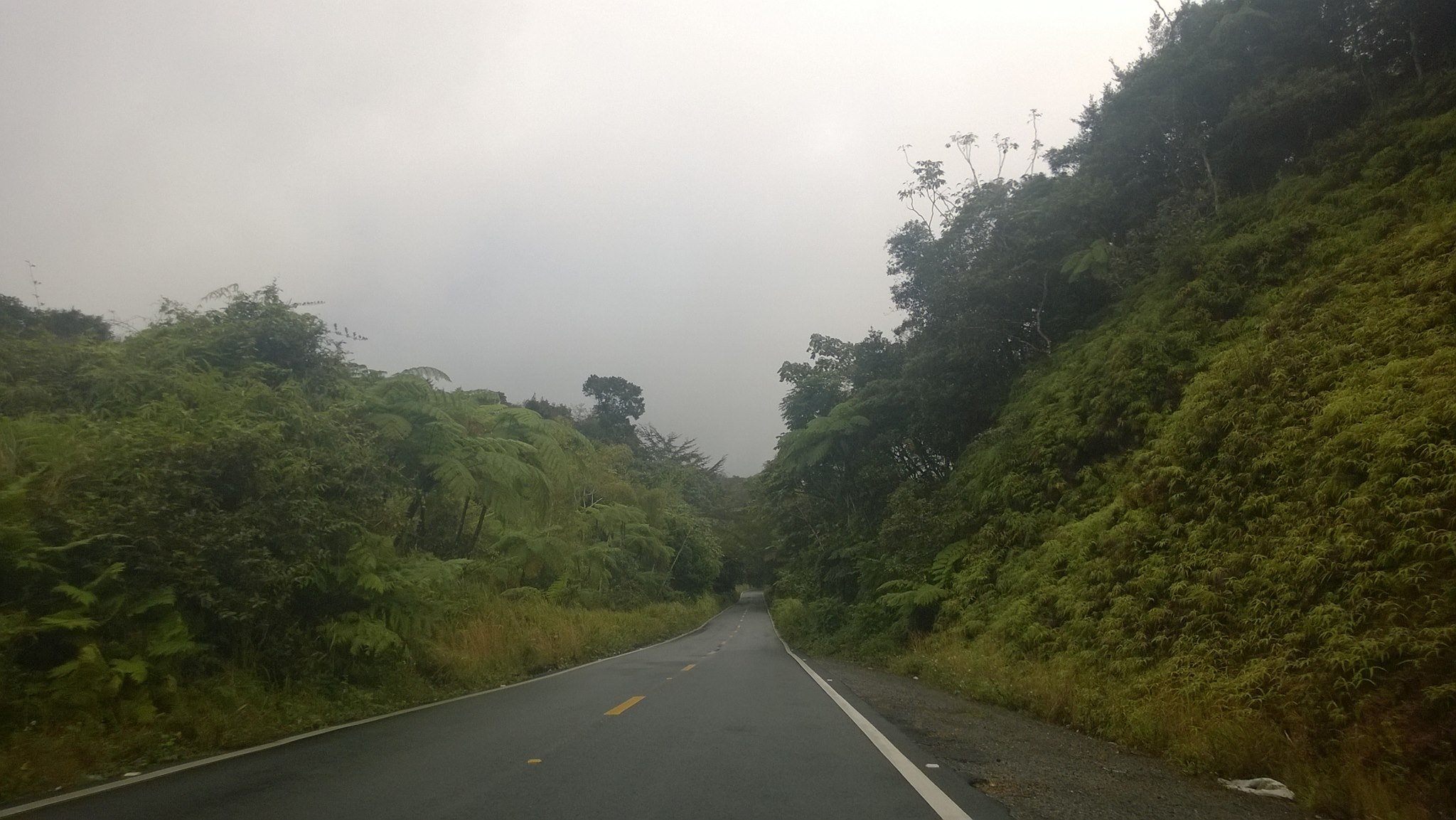
View of the forest from highway PR-184.

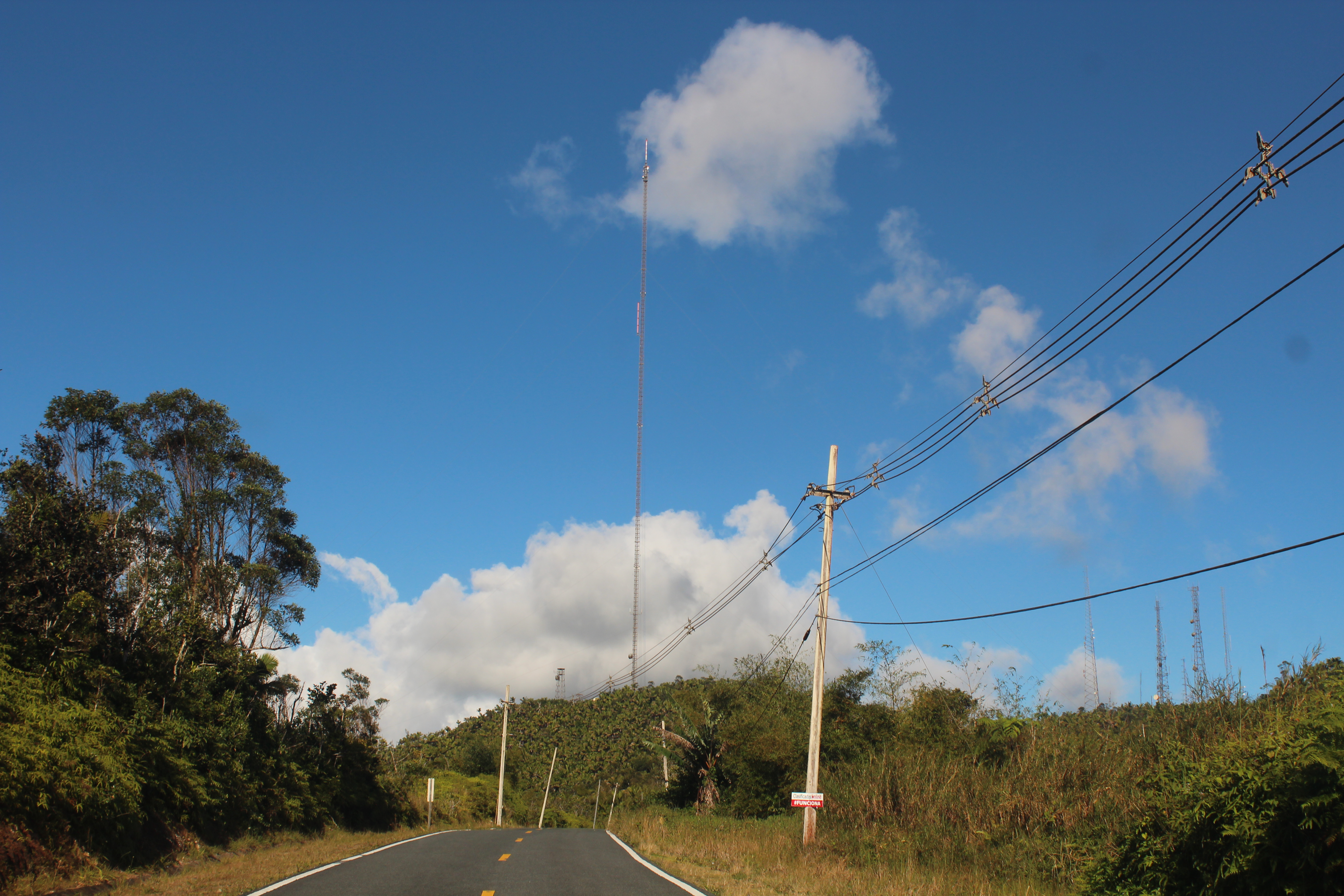
Cerro La Santa from PR-184.

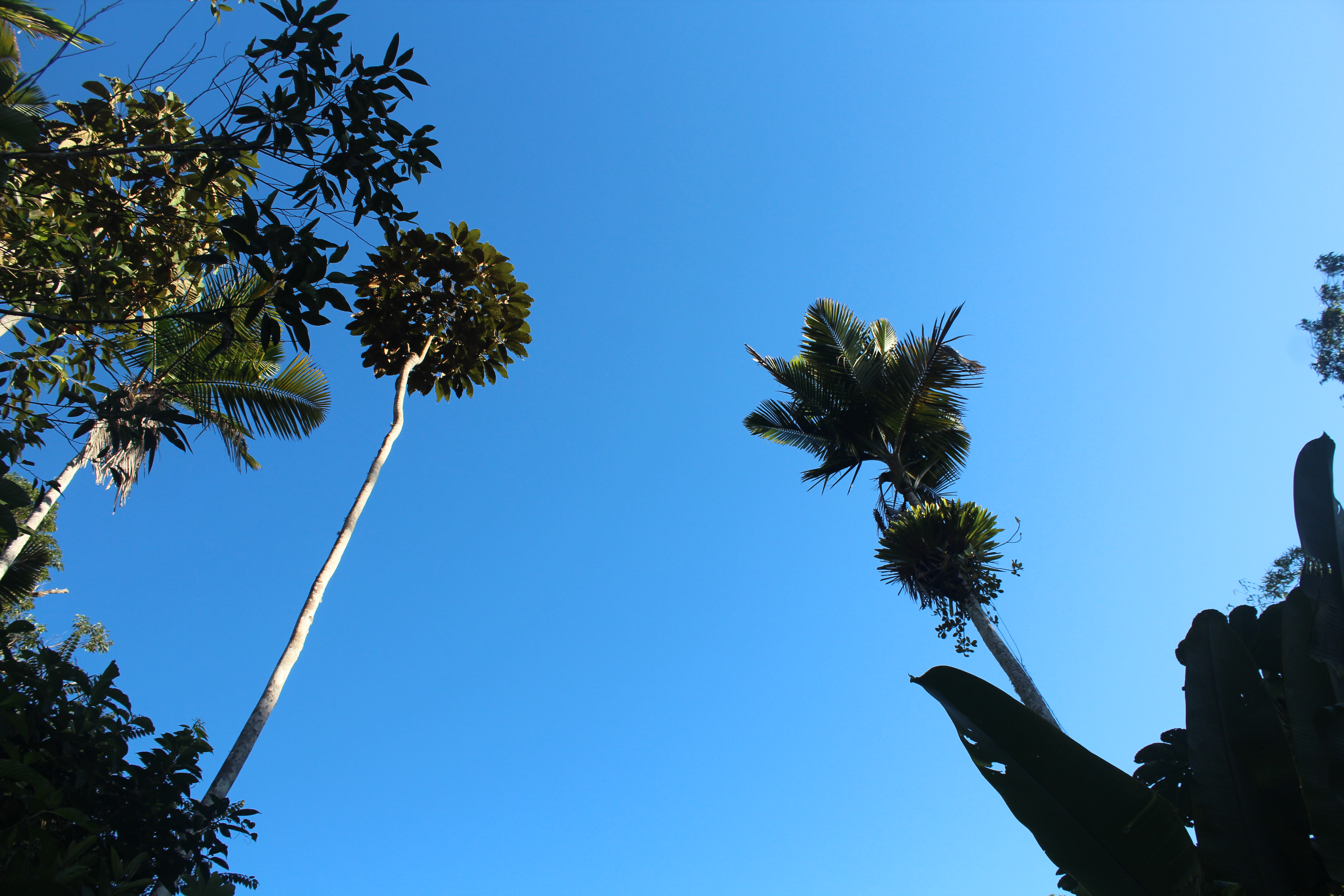
Vegetation in the forest.

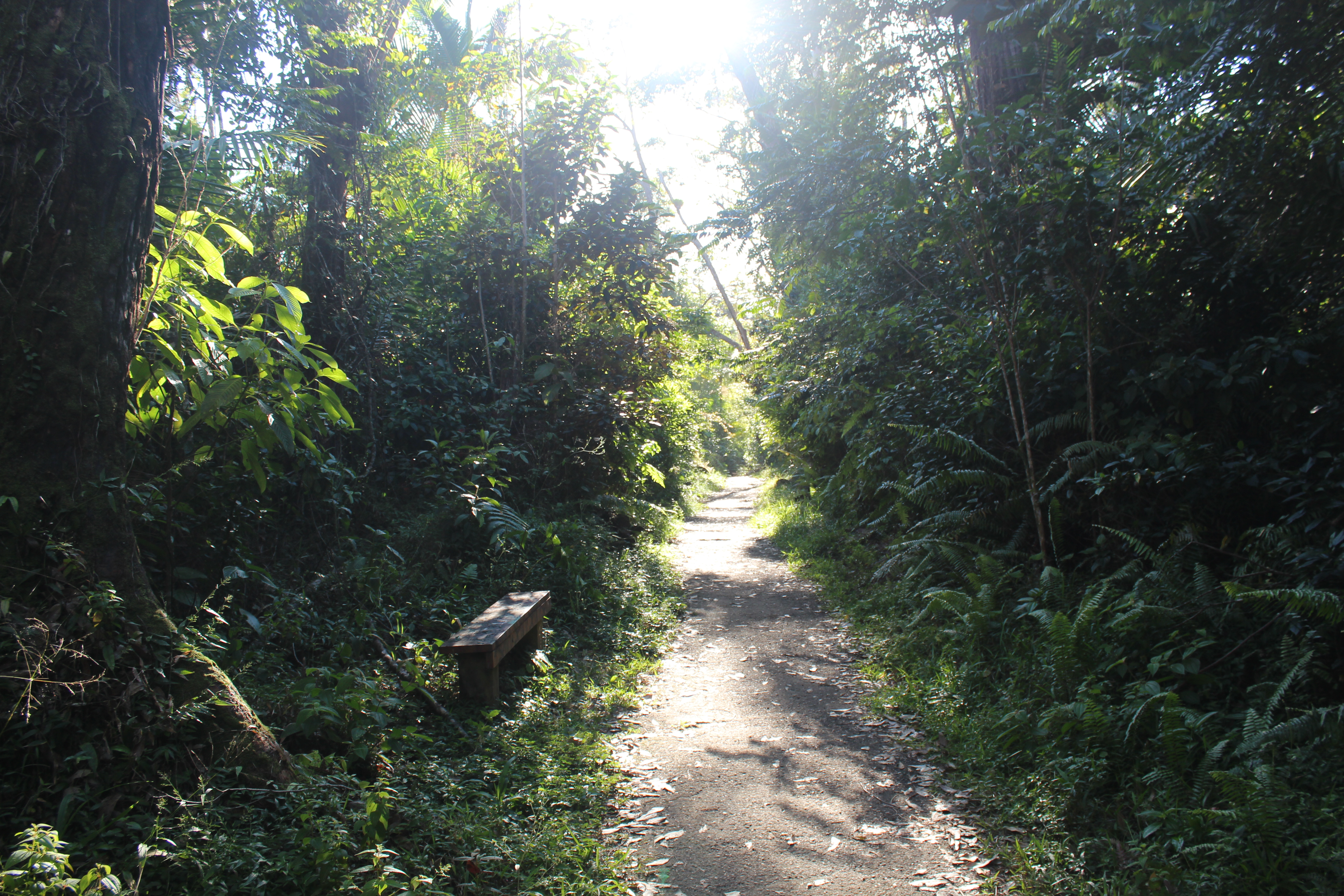
Hiking trail near Charco Azul.

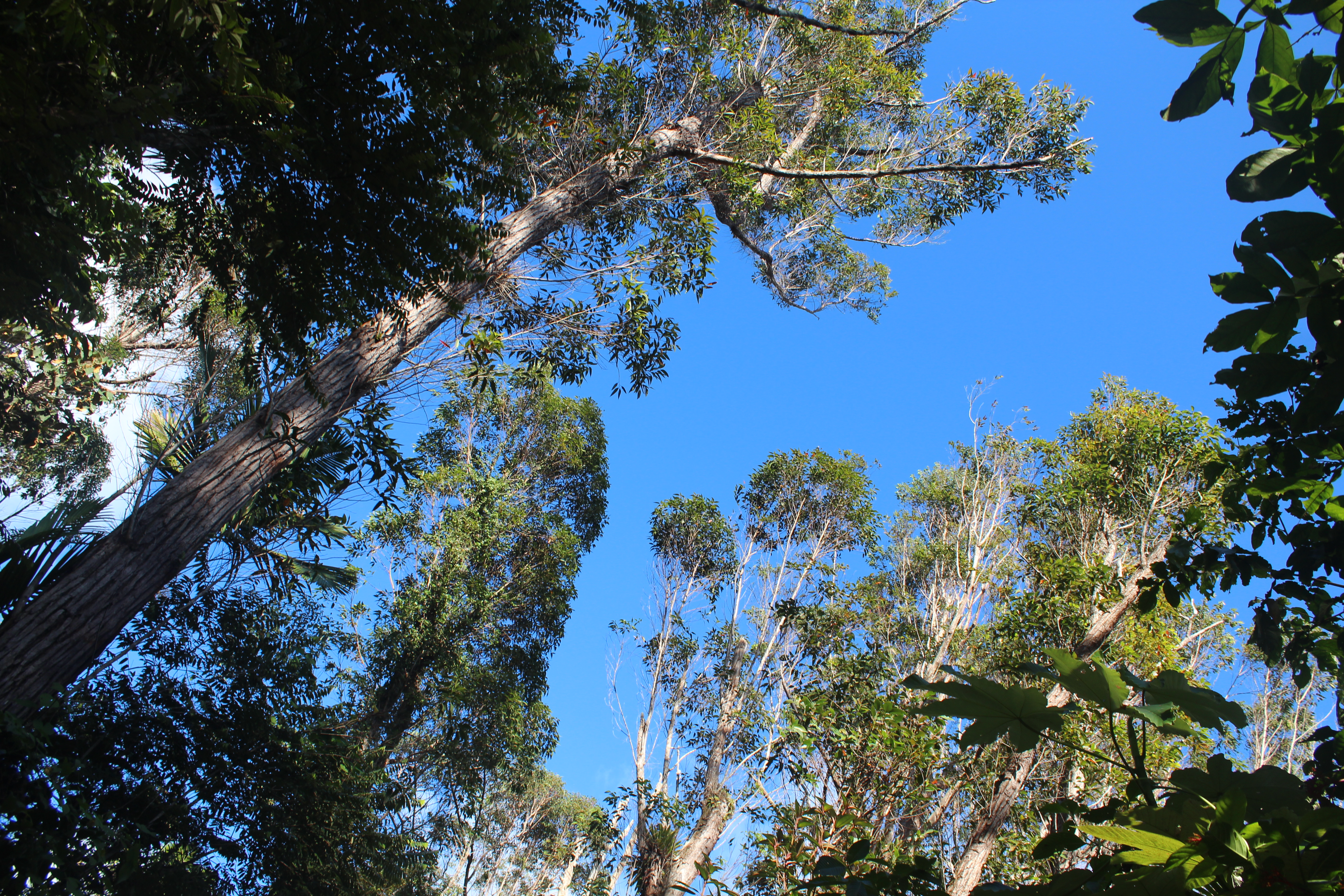
Tabonuco forest.

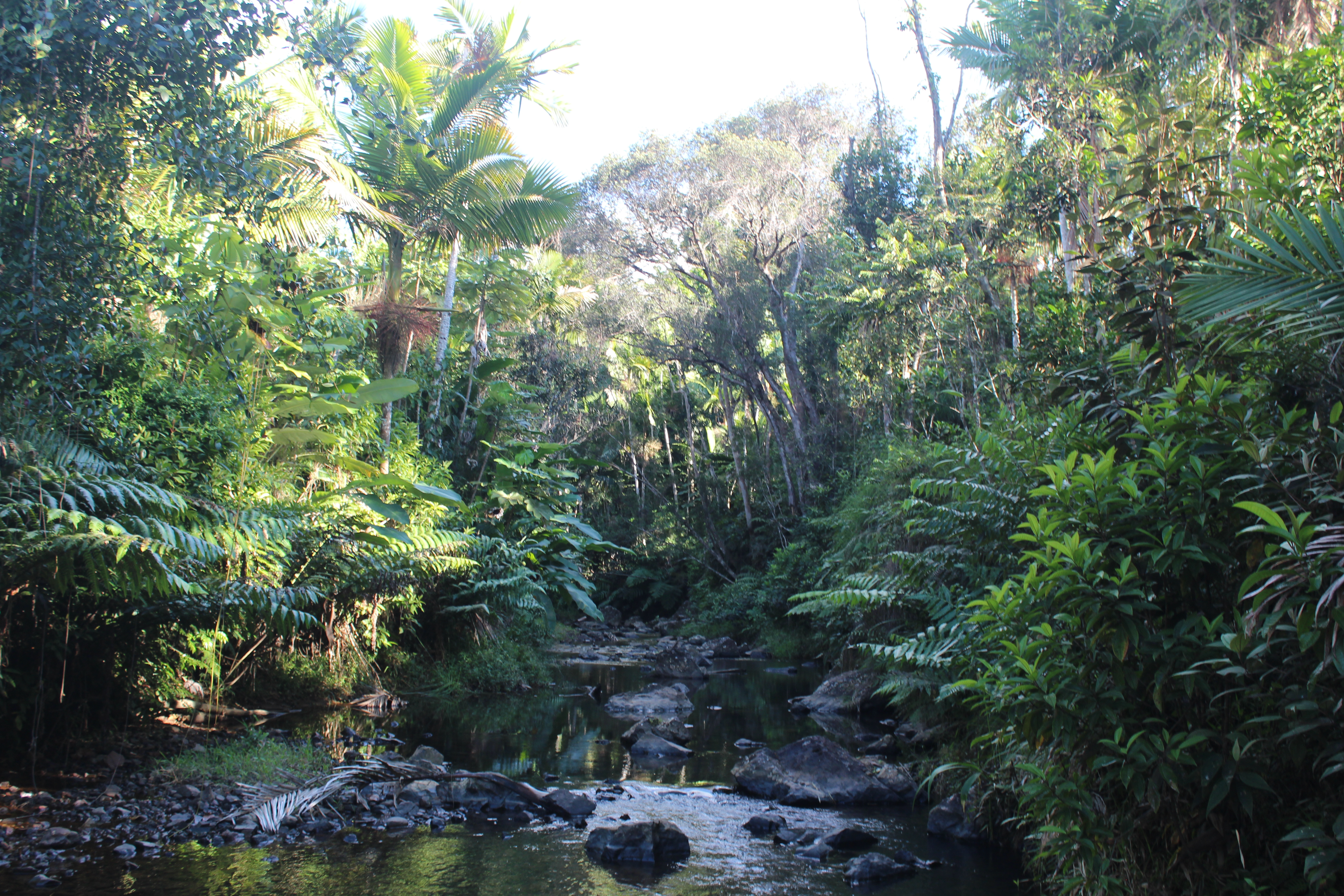
Creek near Charco Azul

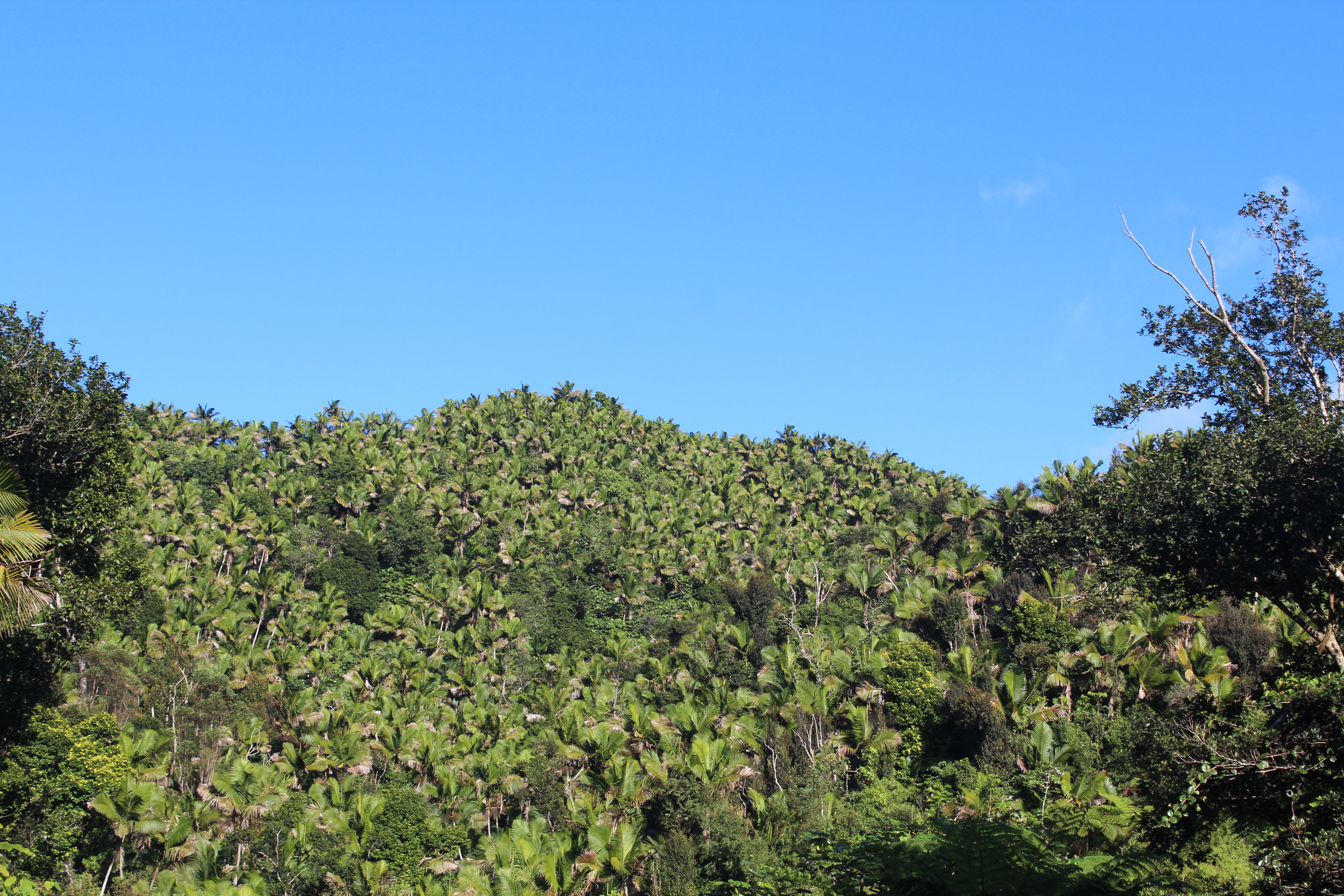
Sierra palm forest near Cerro La Santa.

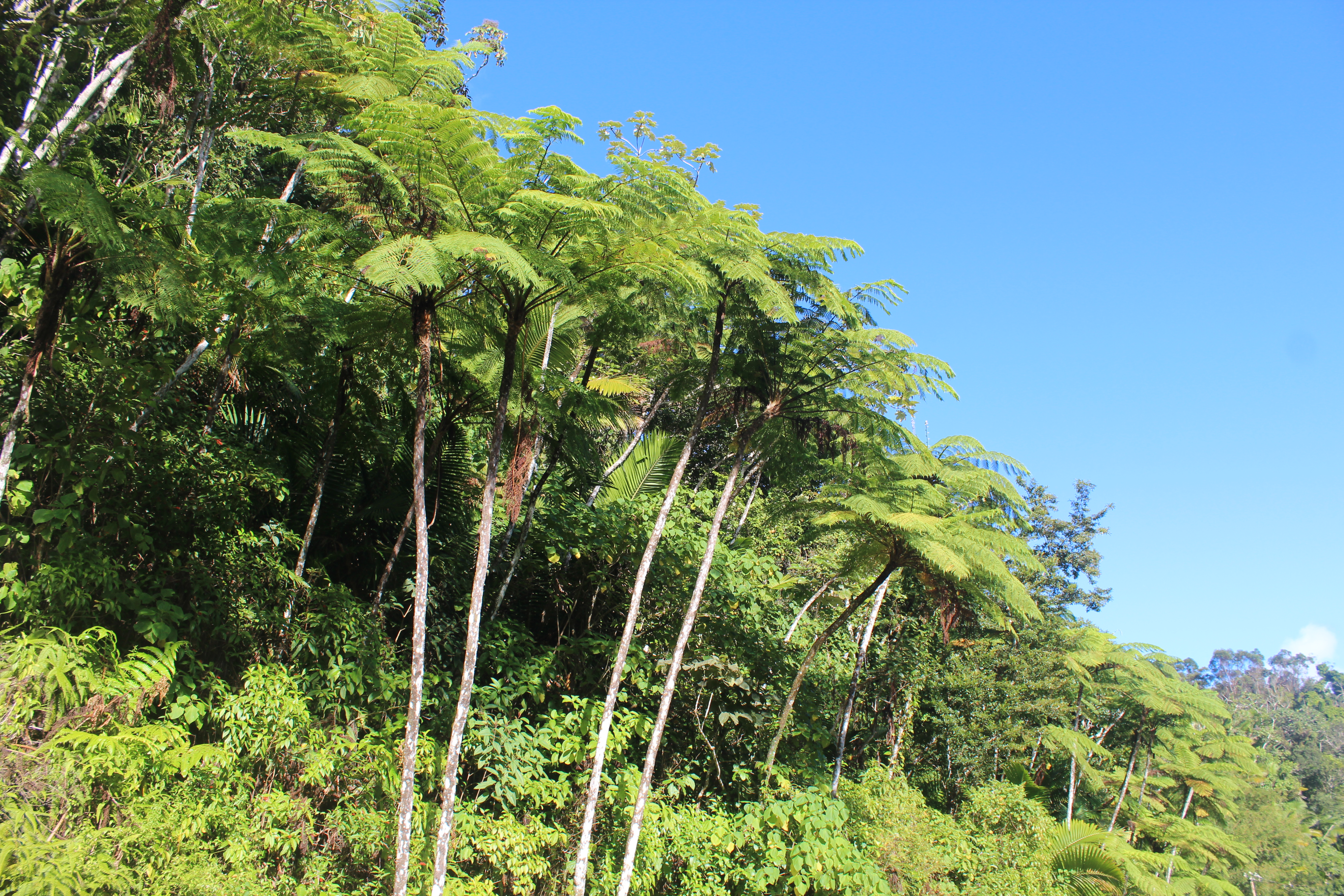
Tree ferns common in the forest.

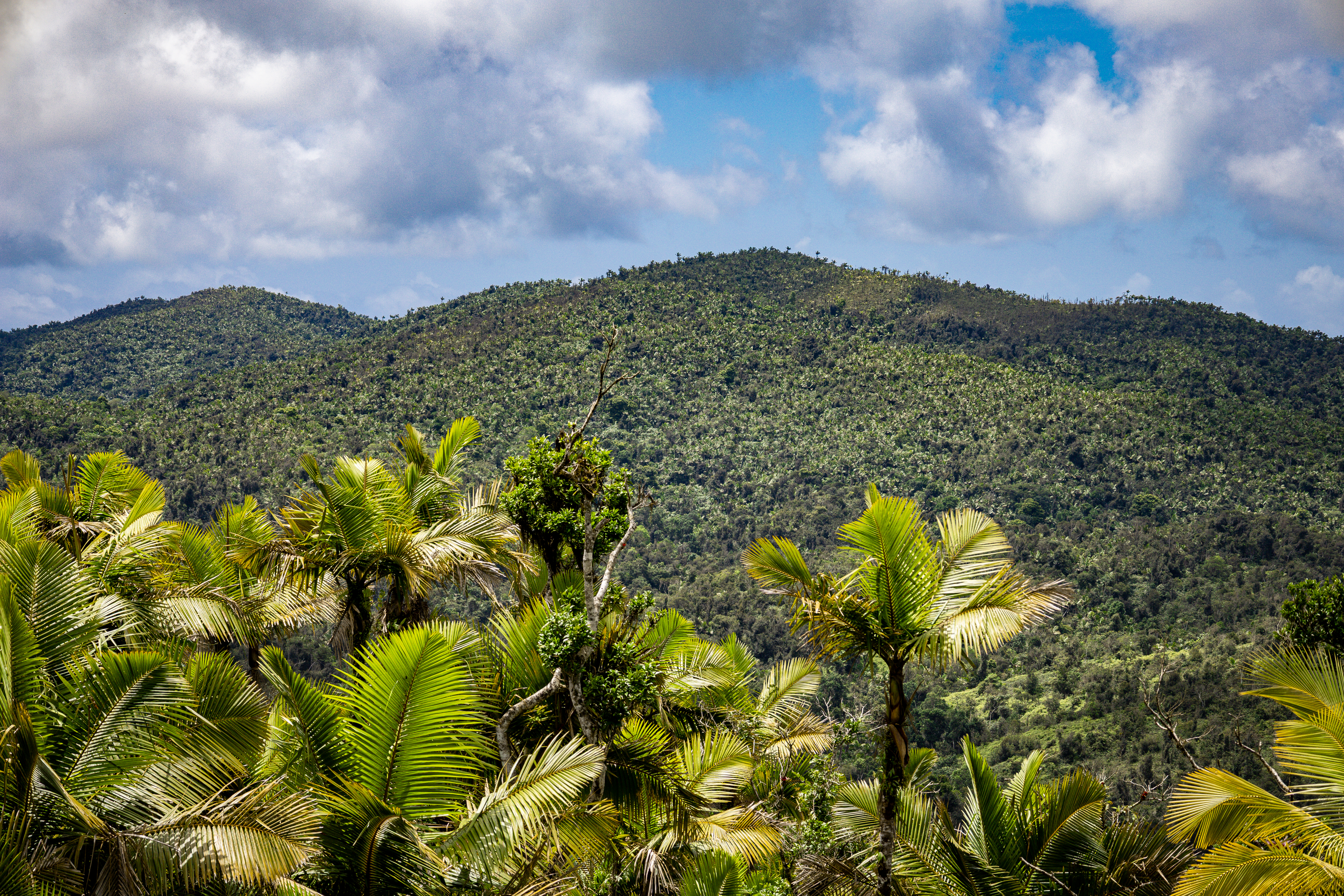
Carite from Montaña Santa

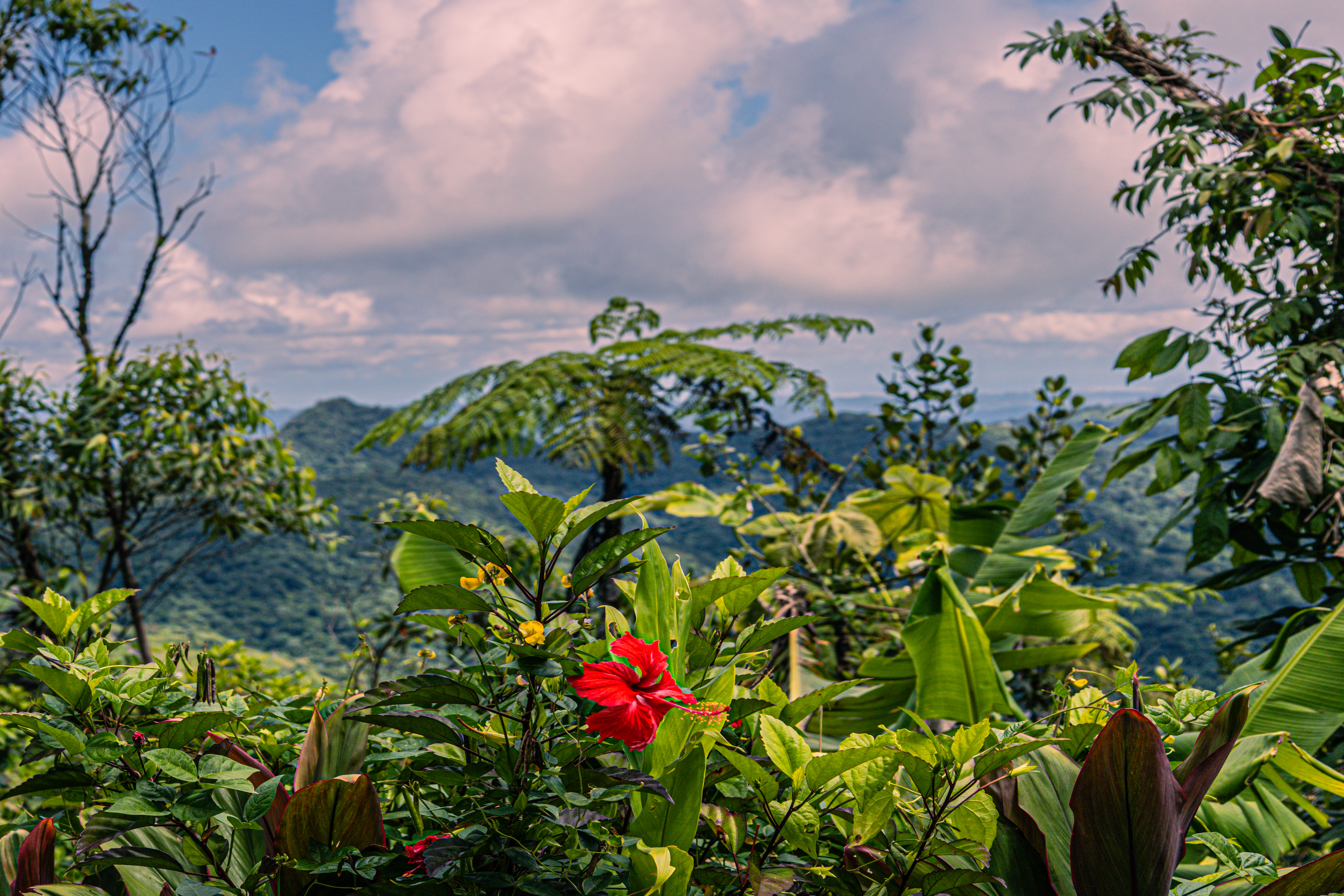
Carite from Montaña Santa

== See also ==
- Guavate, Cayey
- El Yunque National Forest
- Guilarte State Forest
- Toro Negro State Forest

== External sites ==
- Media related to Bosque Estatal de Carite at Wikimedia Commons
- Bosques de Puerto Rico - El Bosque Estatal de Carite (in Spanish)
