= Mulas =

Barrio of Patillas, Puerto Rico

- Barrio
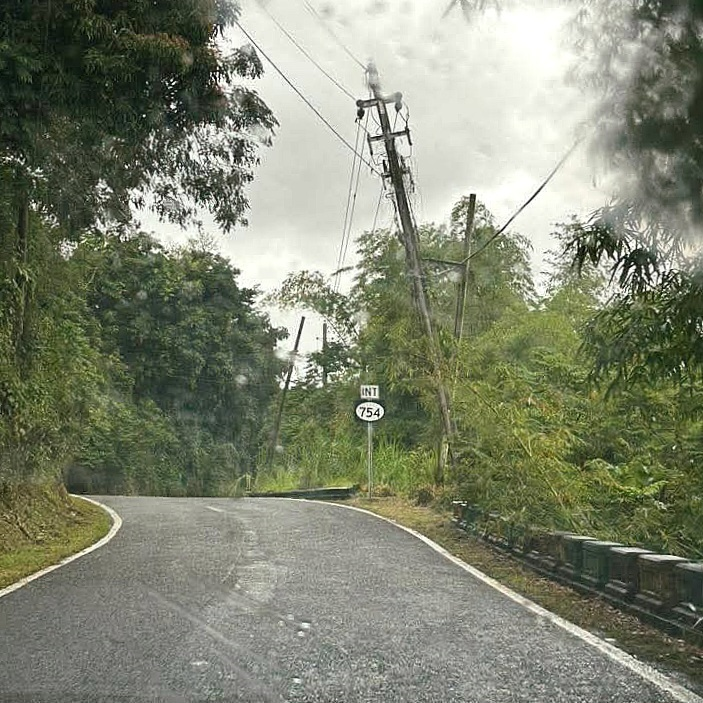
- Puerto Rico Highway 184 in Mulas

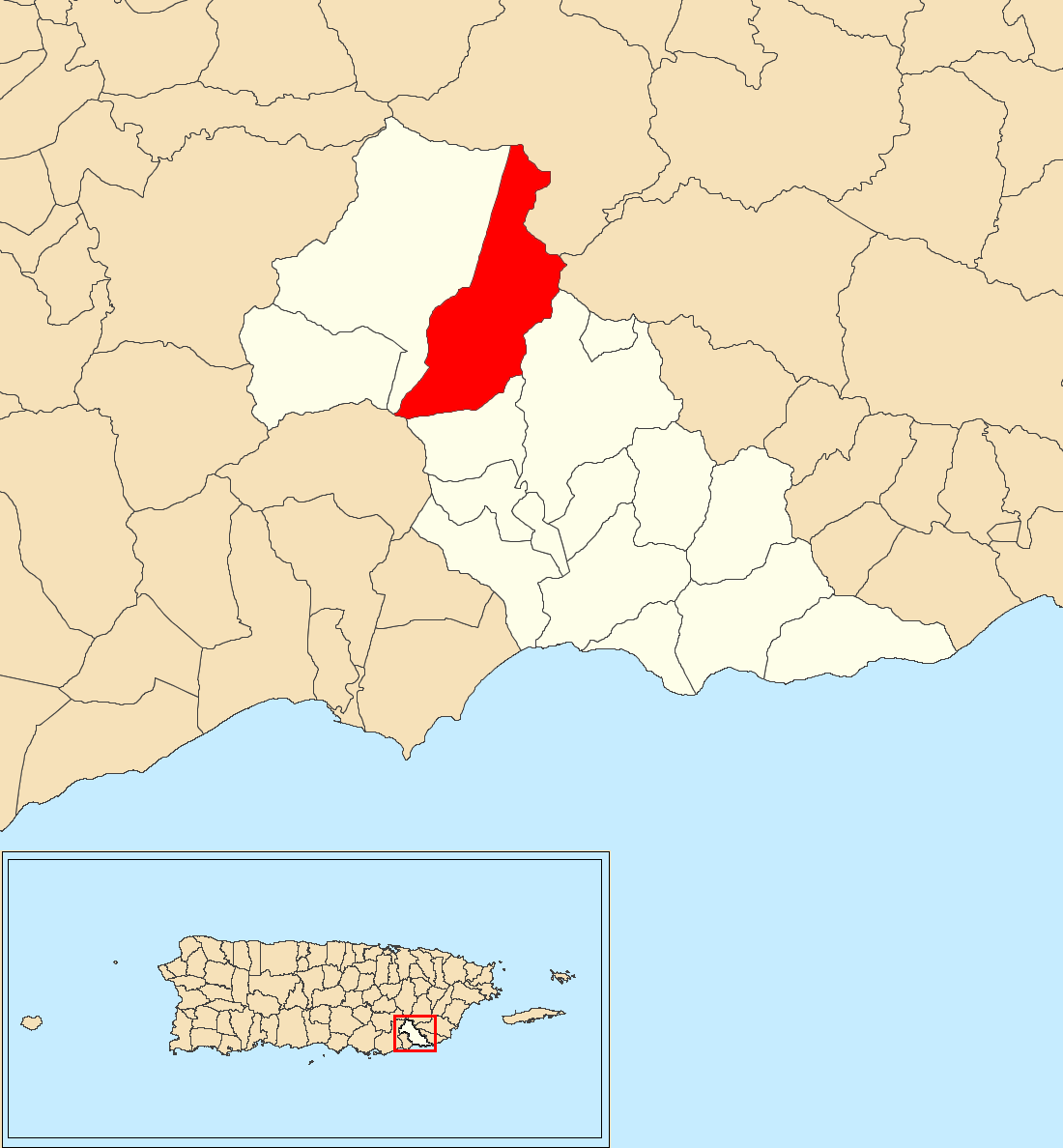
- Location of Mulas within the municipality of Patillas shown in red

- Location of Puerto Rico
- Coordinates: 18°03′49″N 66°01′38″W
- Commonwealth: Puerto Rico
- Municipality: Patillas

Area
  - Total: 5.33 sq mi (13.8 km^{2})
  - Land: 5.33 sq mi (13.8 km^{2})
  - Water: 0 sq mi (0 km^{2})
- Elevation: 1,060 ft (320 m)

Population (2010)
  - Total: 439
  - Density: 82.4/sq mi (31.8/km^{2})
- Source: 2010 Census
- Time zone: UTC−4 (AST)
- ZIP Code: 00723
- Area code: 787/939

Mulas is a barrio (neighbourhood) in the municipality of Patillas, Puerto Rico. Its population in 2010 was 439.

== History ==
Mulas was in Spain's gazetteers until Puerto Rico was ceded by Spain in the aftermath of the Spanish–American War under the terms of the Treaty of Paris of 1898 and became an unincorporated territory of the United States. In 1899, the United States Department of War conducted a census of Puerto Rico finding that the population of Mulas barrio was 823.

Historical population
| Census | Pop. | Note | %± |
|---|---|---|---|
| 1900 | 823 | | — |
| 1910 | 852 | | 3.5% |
| 1920 | 953 | | 11.9% |
| 1930 | 822 | | −13.7% |
| 1940 | 877 | | 6.7% |
| 1950 | 842 | | −4.0% |
| 1960 | 721 | | −14.4% |
| 1970 | 713 | | −1.1% |
| 1980 | 590 | | −17.3% |
| 1990 | 454 | | −23.1% |
| 2000 | 502 | | 10.6% |
| 2010 | 439 | | −12.5% |
U.S. Decennial Census; 1899 (shown as 1900) 1910-1930; 1930-1950 1980-2000 2010

== Sectors ==
Barrios (which are, in contemporary times, roughly comparable to minor civil divisions) in turn are further subdivided into smaller local populated place areas/units called sectores (sectors in English). The types of sectores may vary, from normally sector to urbanización to reparto to barriada to residencial, among others.

The following sectors are in Mulas barrio:

Carretera 184, Carretera 754, Sector Anón, Sector Icaco, Sector Las Delicias, Sector Neris, Sector Pueblito, and Sector Sofía.

== See also ==
- List of communities in Puerto Rico
- List of barrios and sectors of Patillas, Puerto Rico
