= Muñoz Rivera =

Barrio of Patillas, Puerto Rico

- Barrio
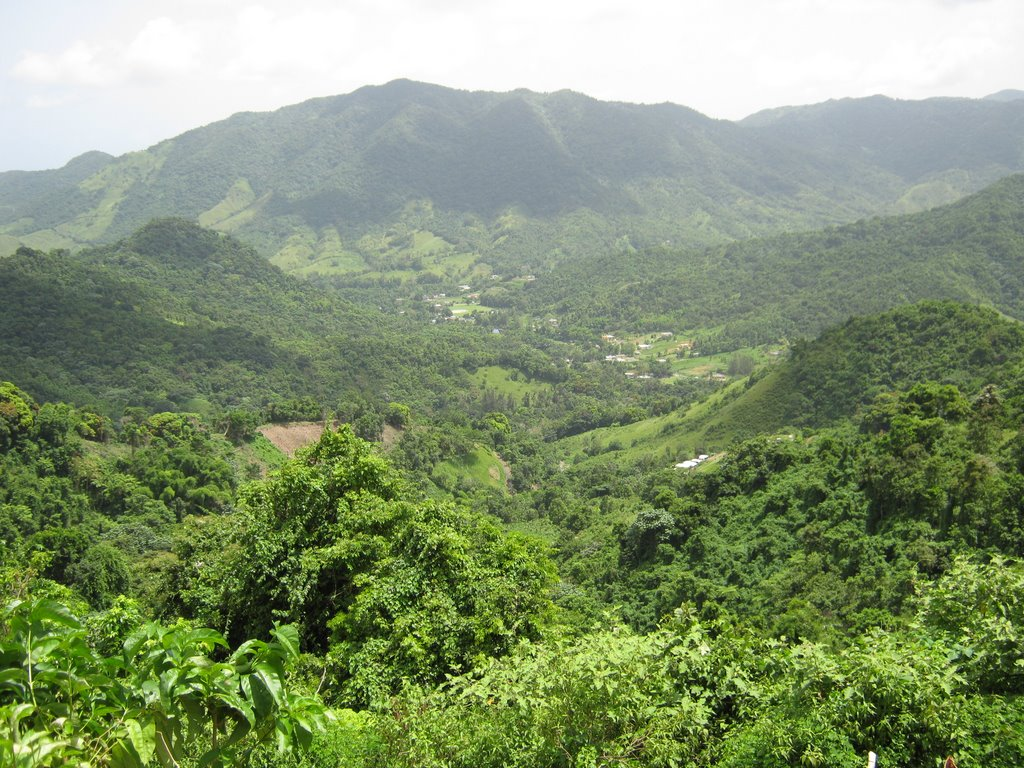
- View from Muñoz Rivera

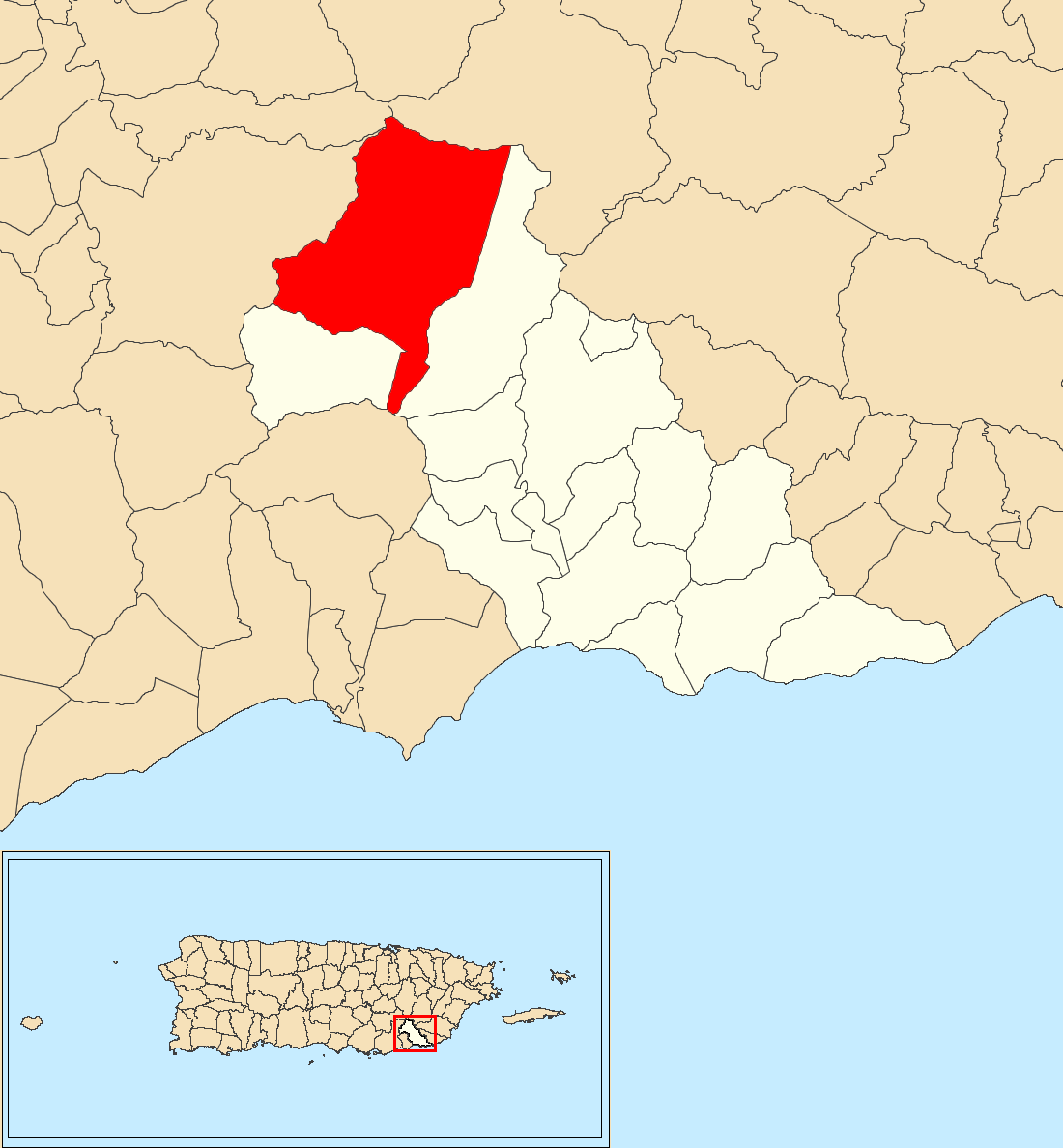
- Location of Muñoz Rivera within the municipality of Patillas shown in red

- Location of Puerto Rico
- Coordinates: 18°04′51″N 66°02′49″W
- Commonwealth: Puerto Rico
- Municipality: Patillas

Area
  - Total: 8.84 sq mi (22.9 km^{2})
  - Land: 8.84 sq mi (22.9 km^{2})
  - Water: 0 sq mi (0 km^{2})
- Elevation: 1,316 ft (401 m)

Population (2010)
  - Total: 673
  - Density: 76.1/sq mi (29.4/km^{2})
- Source: 2010 Census
- Time zone: UTC−4 (AST)
- ZIP Code: 00723
- Area code: 787/939

Muñoz Rivera is a barrio in the municipality of Patillas, Puerto Rico. Its population in 2010 was 673.

Historical population
Census	Pop.	Note	%±
1900	1,080		—
1910	933		−13.6%
1920	1,109		18.9%
1930	926		−16.5%
1940	1,215		31.2%
1950	1,311		7.9%
1960	1,043		−20.4%
1970	715		−31.4%
1980	567		−20.7%
1990	904		59.4%
2000	743		−17.8%
2010	673		−9.4%
U.S. Decennial Census; 1899 (shown as 1900) 1910-1930; 1930-1950 1980-2000 2010

== Sectors ==
Barrios (which are, in contemporary times, roughly comparable to minor civil divisions) in turn are further subdivided into smaller local populated place areas/units called sectores (sectors in English). The types of sectores may vary, from normally sector to urbanización to reparto to barriada to residencial, among others.

The following sectors are in Muñoz Rivera barrio:

Carretera 179, Carretera 184, Sector El Campamento Real, Sector Los Tres Chorros, Sector Miraflores, Sector Palma Sola, Sector Real, Sector Riachuelo, Sector Río Arriba, and Sector Sonadora.

== Gallery ==
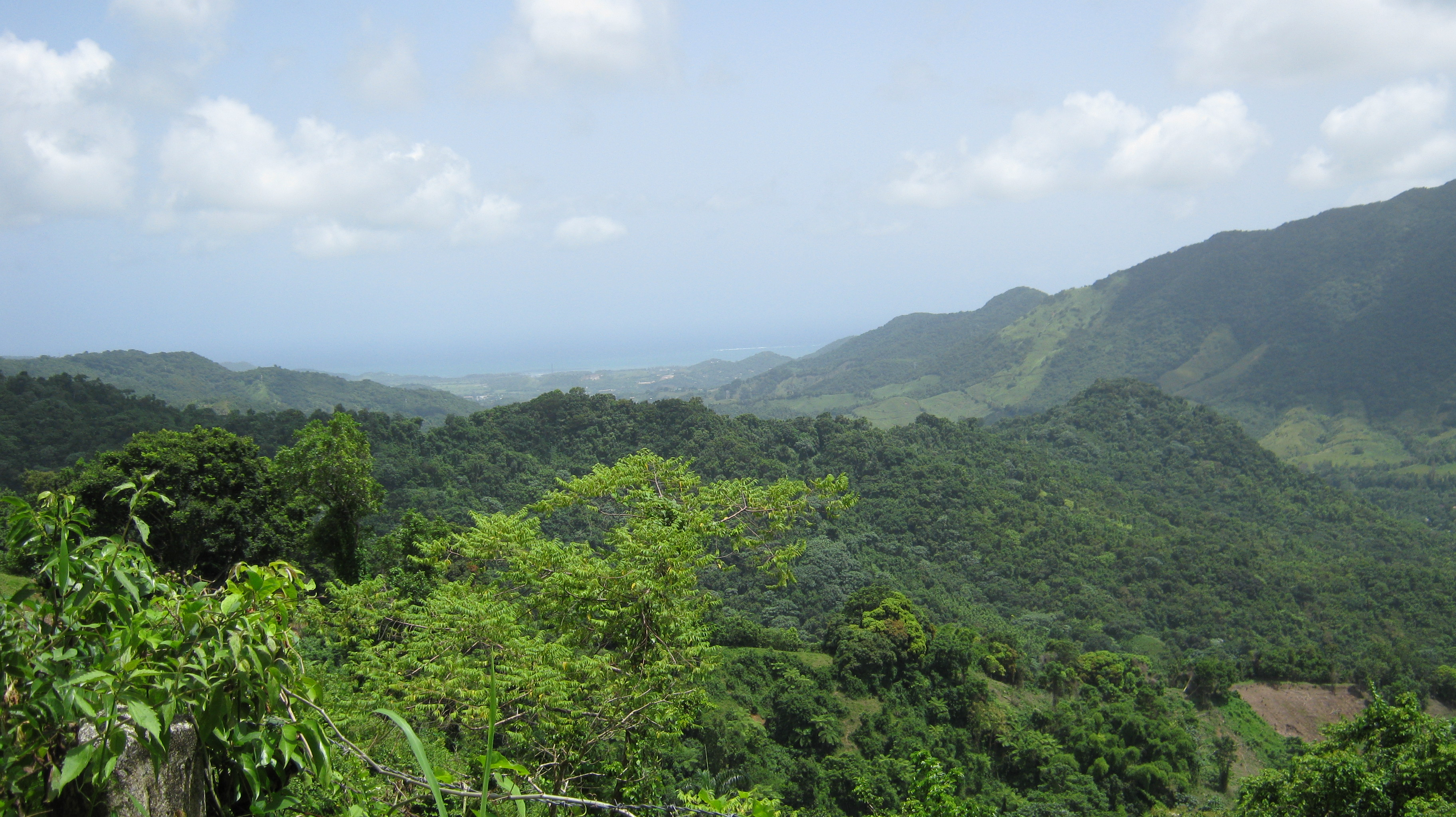
View facing Patillas Pueblo from PR-184

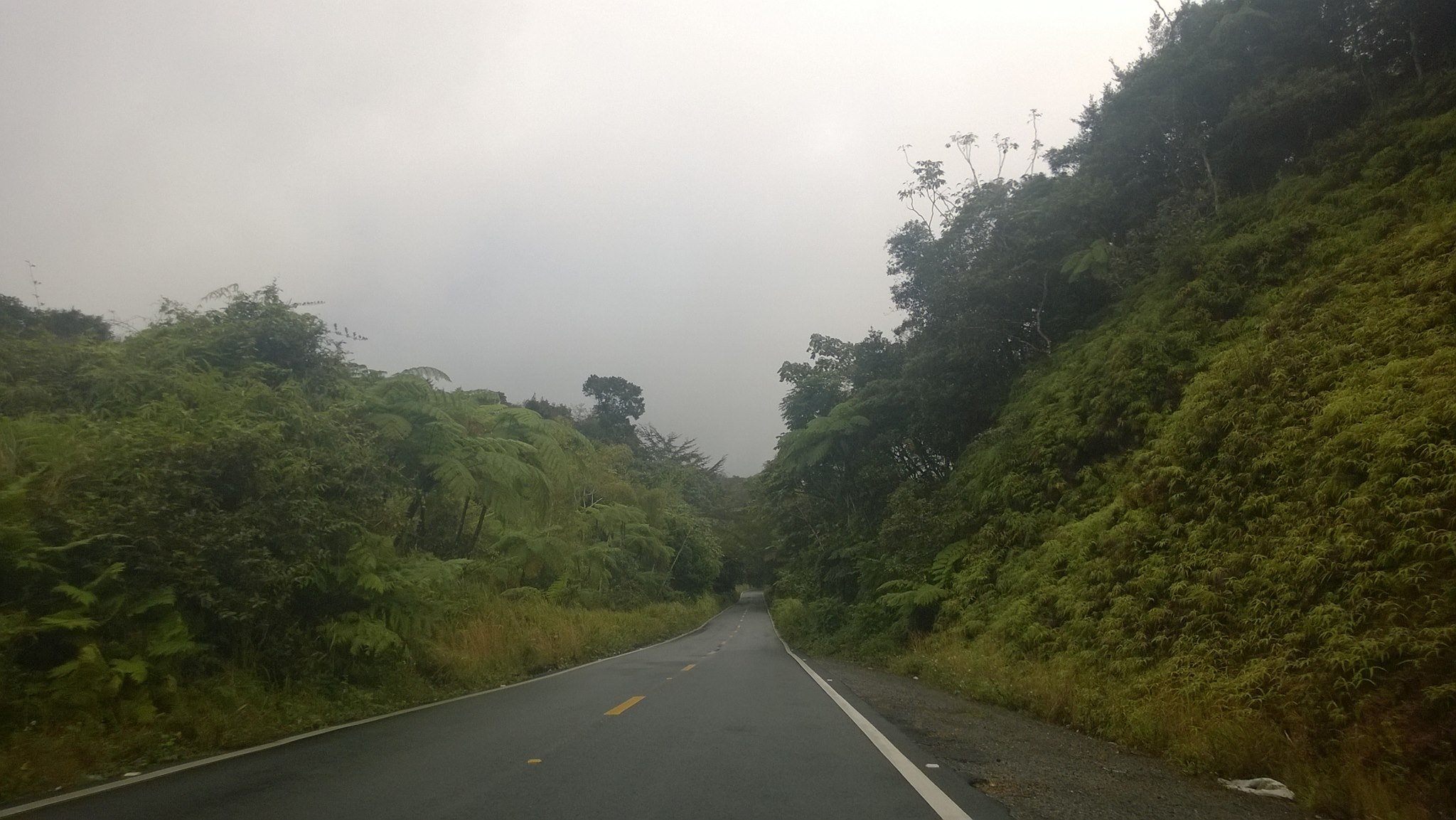
Puerto Rico Highway 184 in Muñoz Rivera

== See also ==
- List of communities in Puerto Rico
- List of barrios and sectors of Patillas, Puerto Rico
