= Guavate, Cayey, Puerto Rico =

Barrio of Cayey, Puerto Rico

Guavate
- Barrio
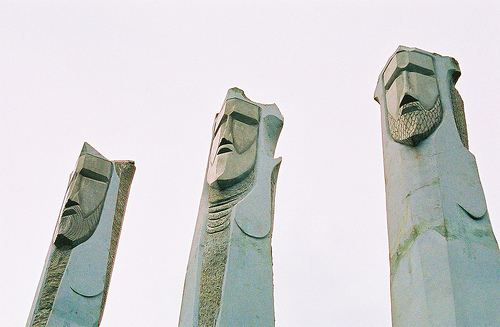
- Three Kings Monument carved by sculptor Juan Santos Torres at the Loma de los Tres Reyes Magos

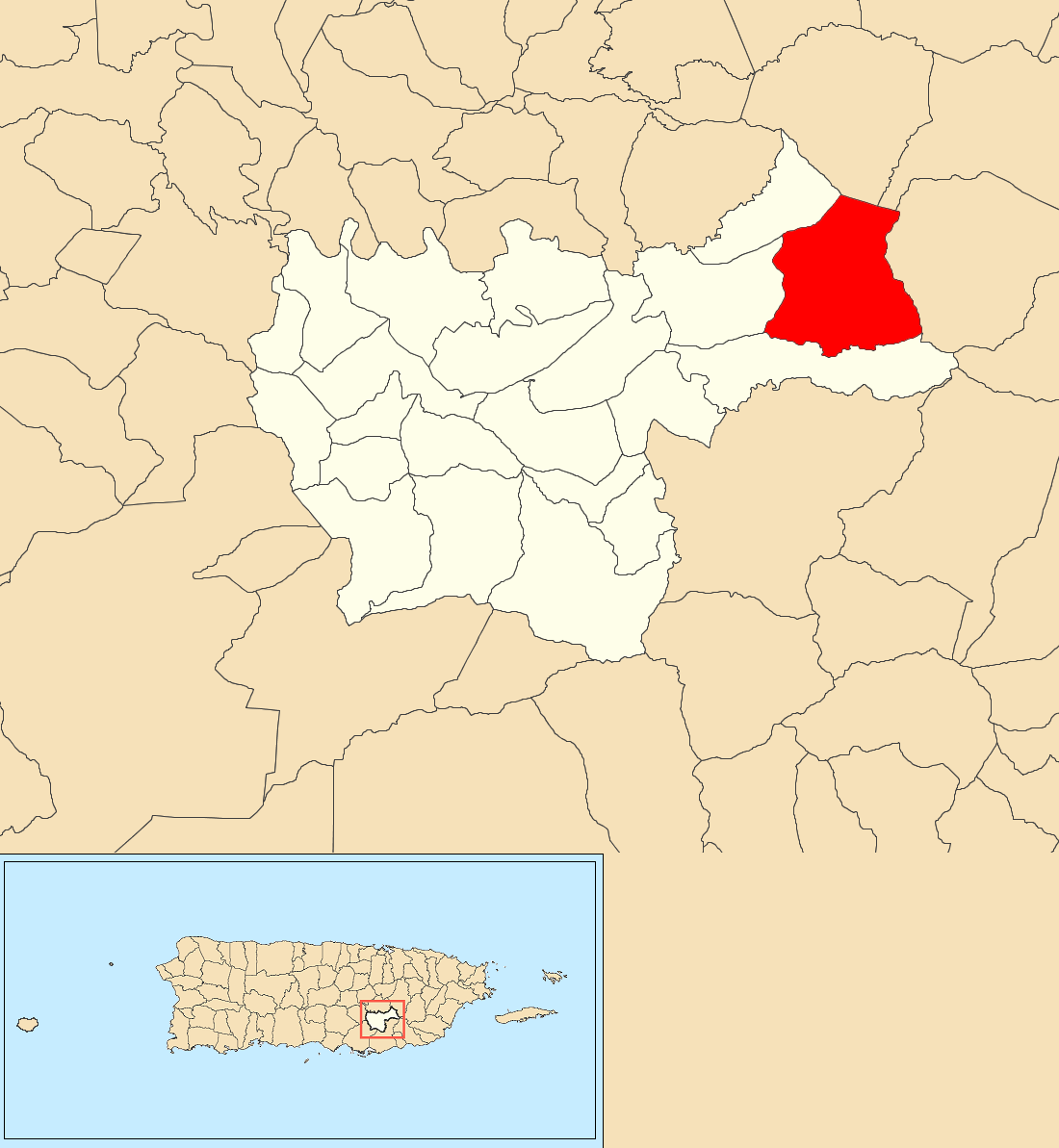
- Location of Guavate within the municipality of Cayey shown in red

- Location of Puerto Rico
- Coordinates: 18°07′56″N 66°04′43″W
- Commonwealth: Puerto Rico
- Municipality: Cayey

Area
  - Total: 4.52 sq mi (11.7 km^{2})
  - Land: 4.52 sq mi (11.7 km^{2})
  - Water: 0 sq mi (0 km^{2})
- Elevation: 1,673 ft (510 m)

Population (2010)
  - Total: 1,870
  - Density: 413.7/sq mi (159.7/km^{2})
- Source: 2010 Census
- Time zone: UTC−4 (AST)
- ZIP Codes: 00736
- Area code: 787/939

Guavate is a barrio in the municipality of Cayey, Puerto Rico. Its population in 2010 was 1,870.

== History ==
Guavate was in Spain's gazetteers until Puerto Rico was ceded by Spain in the aftermath of the Spanish–American War under the terms of the Treaty of Paris of 1898 and became an unincorporated territory of the United States. In 1899, the United States Department of War conducted a census of Puerto Rico finding that the combined population of Beatriz and Guavate barrios was 853.

Historical population
Census	Pop.	Note	%±
1910	433		—
1920	320		−26.1%
1930	519		62.2%
1940	949		82.9%
1950	1,031		8.6%
1960	931		−9.7%
1970	893		−4.1%
1980	939		5.2%
1990	1,562		66.3%
2000	1,491		−4.5%
2010	1,870		25.4%
U.S. Decennial Census; 1900 (N/A) 1910-1930; 1930-1950 1980-2000 2010

== Tourism ==
Guavate is known for its "pork highway" (a stretch of Puerto Rico Highway 184) and was featured in the Discover Puerto Rico tourism campaign of 2019 for being a must-see place in Puerto Rico because of its tender pork cuisine, mild weather and scenic views of Sierra de Cayey. The Carite State Forest is located nearby.

== Notable residents ==
Juan Santos Torres El Picapiedras de Guavate is a well-known Puerto Rican sculptor who lives in and has a workshop in Guavate.

== Gallery ==
Places in Guavate

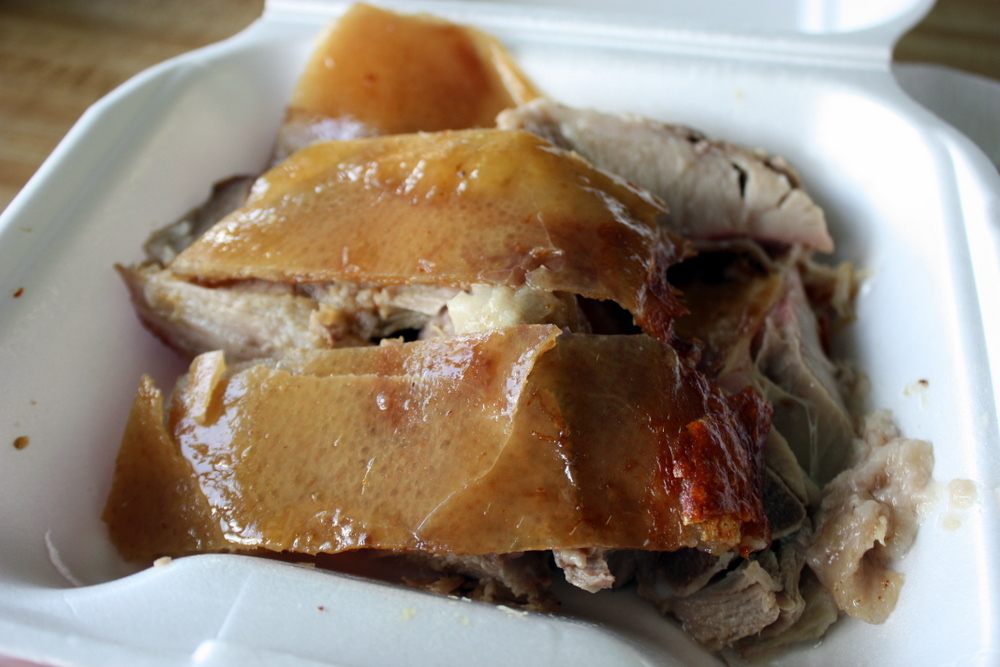
Los Pinos lechonera

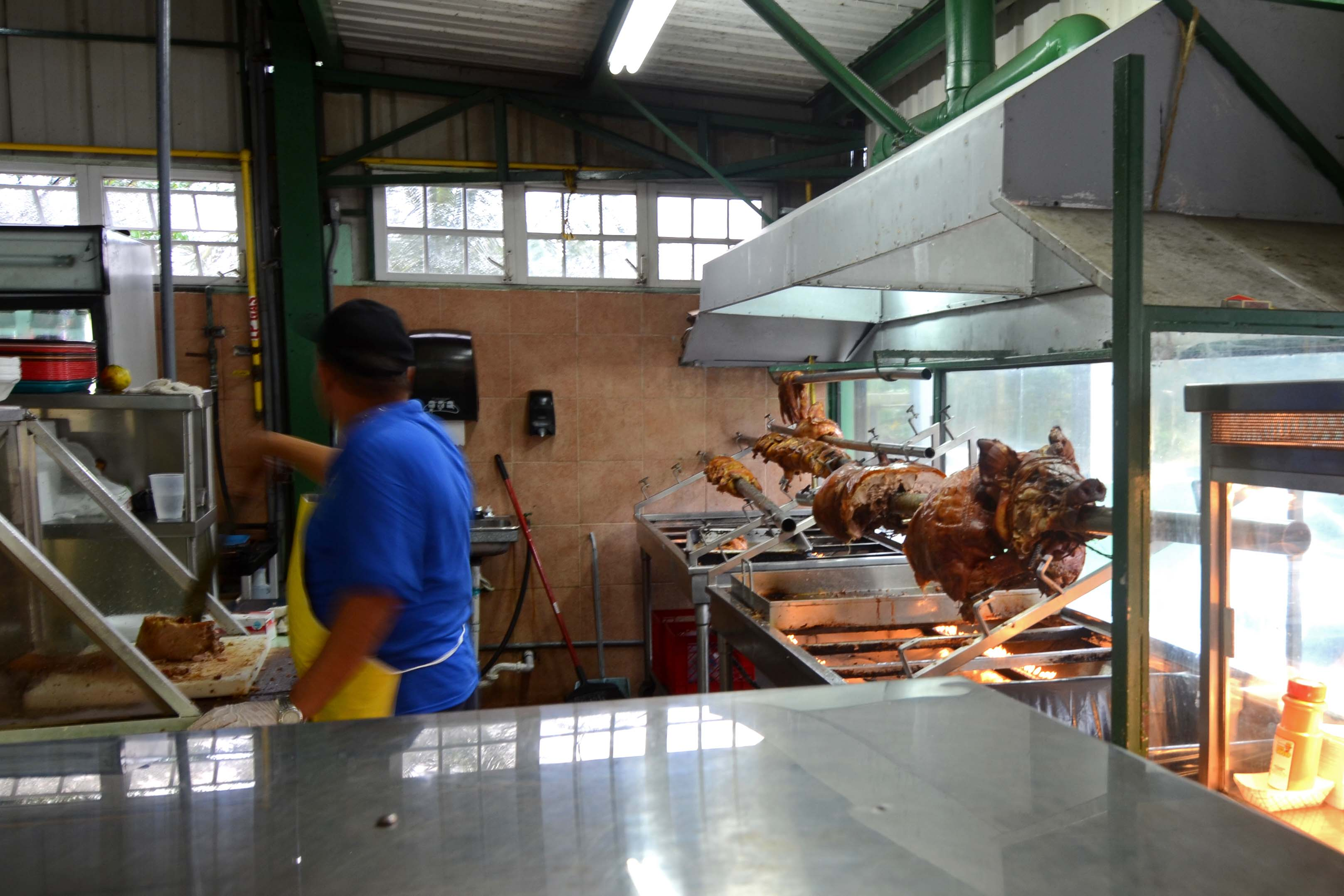
Lechonera

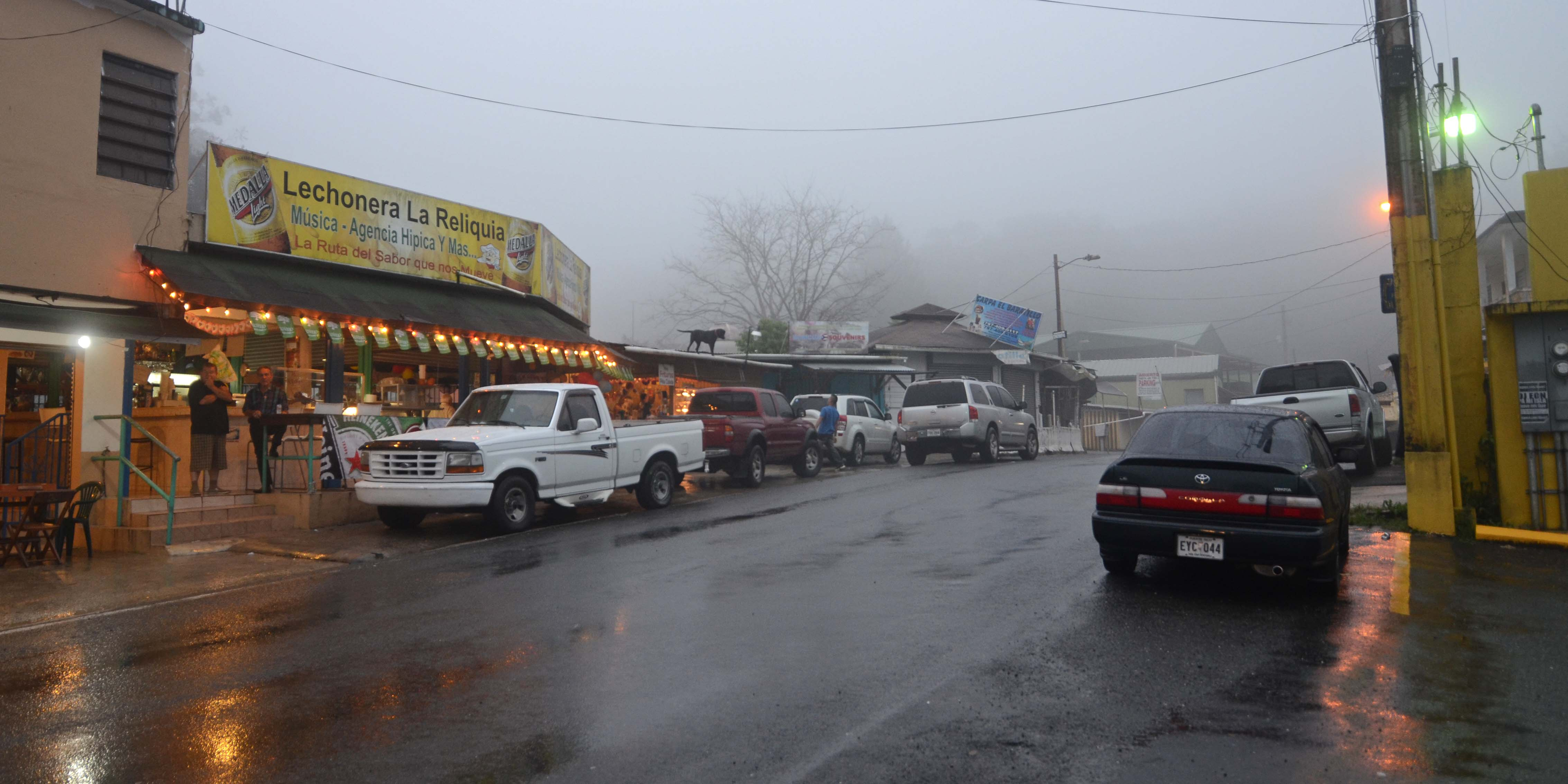
View of lechoneras on PR-184

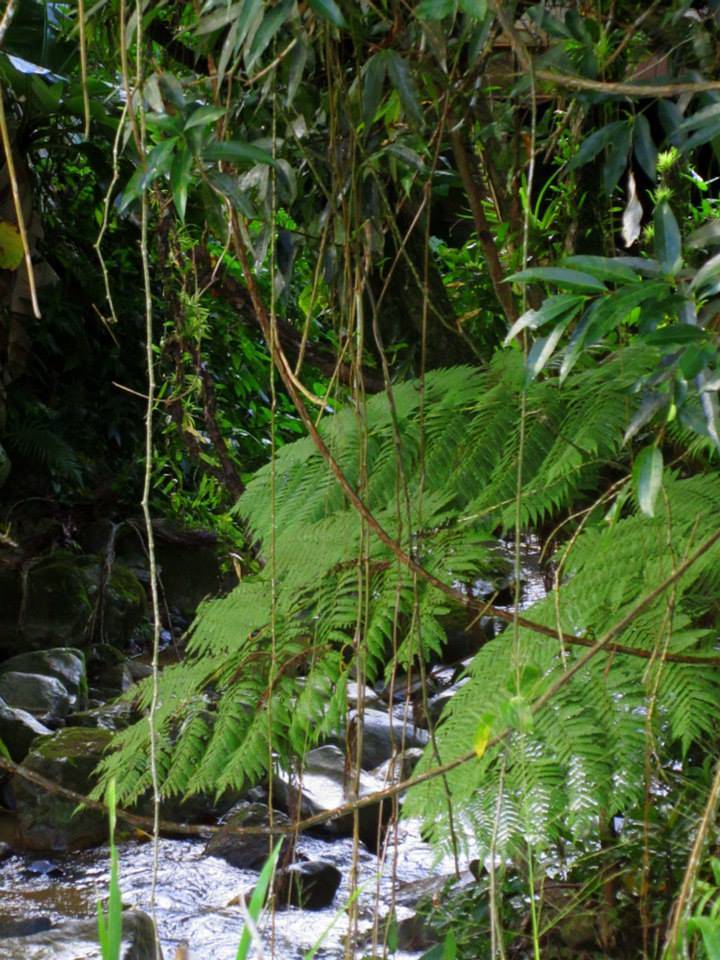
Guavate River

== See also ==
- List of communities in Puerto Rico
