= Cacao Bajo =

Barrio of Patillas, Puerto Rico

- Barrio
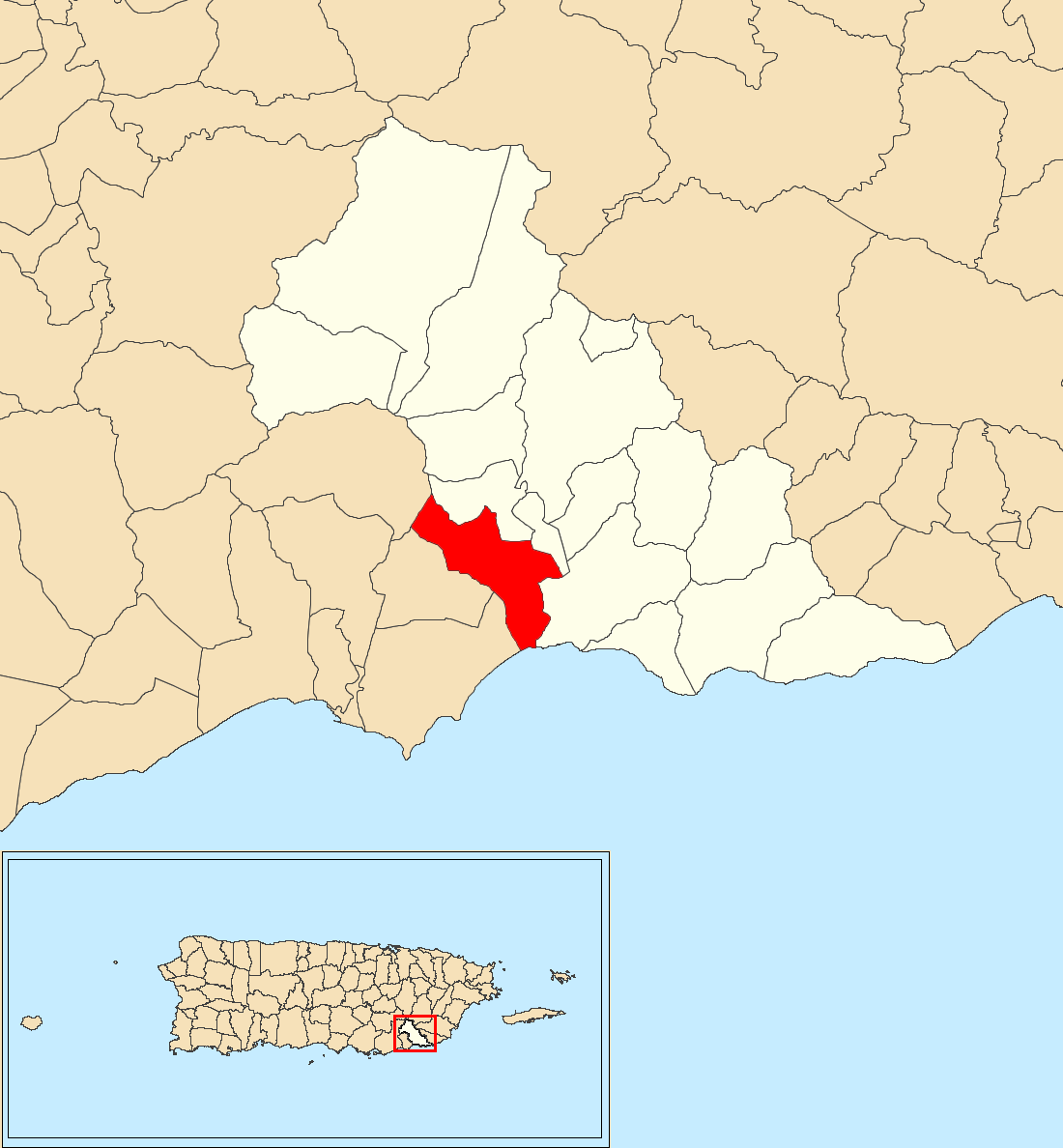
- Location of Cacao Bajo within the municipality of Patillas shown in red

- Location of Puerto Rico
- Coordinates: 17°59′47″N 66°01′38″W
- Commonwealth: Puerto Rico
- Municipality: Patillas

Area
  - Total: 2.63 sq mi (6.8 km^{2})
  - Land: 2.42 sq mi (6.3 km^{2})
  - Water: 0.21 sq mi (0.54 km^{2})
- Elevation: 135 ft (41 m)

Population (2010)
  - Total: 1,437
  - Density: 593.8/sq mi (229.3/km^{2})
- Source: 2010 Census
- Time zone: UTC−4 (AST)
- ZIP Code: 00723
- Area code: 787/939

Cacao Bajo is a barrio in the municipality of Patillas, Puerto Rico. Its population in 2010 was 1,437.

== History ==
Cacao Bajo was in Spain's gazetteers until Puerto Rico was ceded by Spain in the aftermath of the Spanish–American War under the terms of the Treaty of Paris of 1898 and became an unincorporated territory of the United States. In 1899, the United States Department of War conducted a census of Puerto Rico finding that the combined population of Quebrada Arriba and Cacao Bajo barrios was 928.

Historical population
Census	Pop.	Note	%±
1910	598		—
1920	565		−5.5%
1930	405		−28.3%
1940	1,112		174.6%
1950	1,452		30.6%
1960	1,569		8.1%
1970	0		−100.0%
1980	1,718		—
1990	1,906		10.9%
2000	1,425		−25.2%
2010	1,437		0.8%
U.S. Decennial Census; 1900 (N/A) 1910-1930; 1930-1950 1980-2000 2010

== Sectors ==
Barrios (which are, in contemporary times, roughly comparable to minor civil divisions) in turn are further subdivided into smaller local populated place areas/units called sectores (sectors in English). The types of sectores may vary, from normally sector to urbanización to reparto to barriada to residencial, among others.

The following sectors are in Cacao Bajo barrio:

Carretera 3, Carretera 184, Carretera 755, Sector Ancones Sifón, Sector La Herradura, Sector Los Pompos, Sector Margote, Sector Obén, Sector Raja Larga, Sector Sabana, Sector Seboruco, Sector Túnel Sabana, Sector Yaurel Chiquito, Urbanización Estancias de Aurora, and Urbanización Las Violetas.

== See also ==
- List of communities in Puerto Rico
- List of barrios and sectors of Patillas, Puerto Rico
