= Quebrada Arriba, Patillas, Puerto Rico =

Barrio of Puerto Rico

Quebrada Arriba
- Barrio
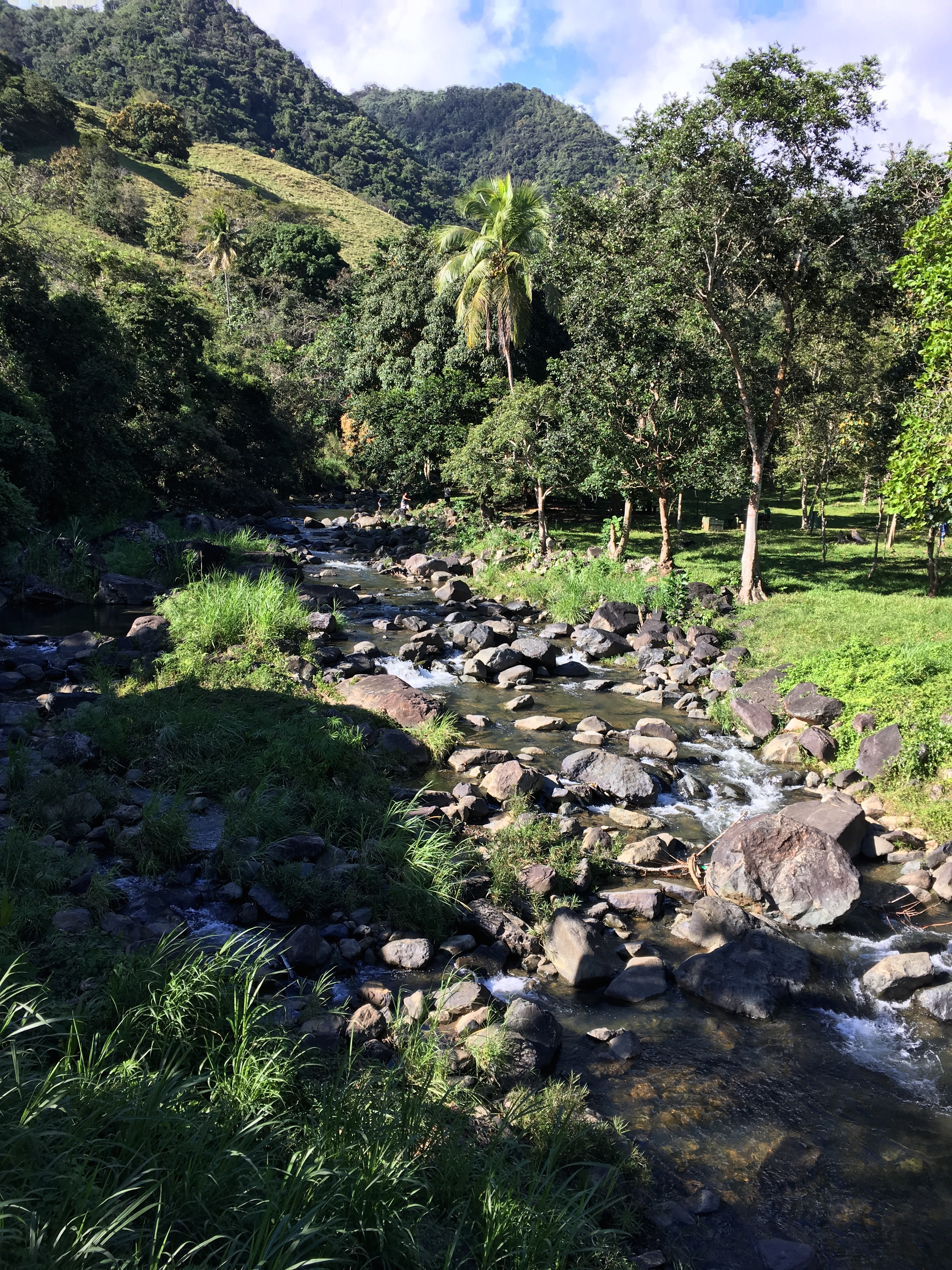
- Recreation area near Quebrada Arriba

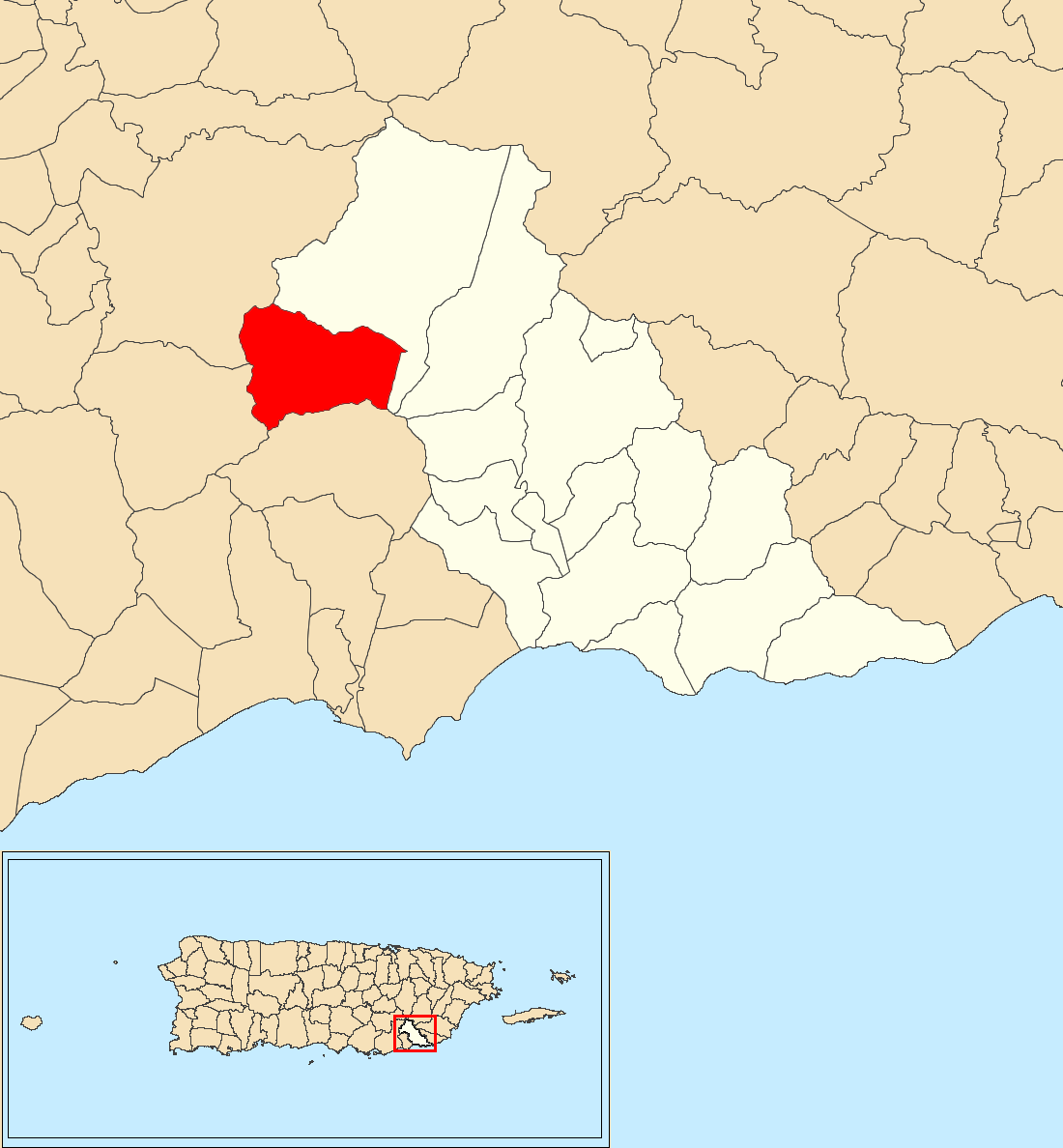
- Location of Quebrada Arriba within the municipality of Patillas shown in red

- Location of Puerto Rico
- Coordinates: 18°02′56″N 66°04′15″W
- Commonwealth: Puerto Rico
- Municipality: Patillas

Area
  - Total: 3.64 sq mi (9.4 km^{2})
  - Land: 3.64 sq mi (9.4 km^{2})
  - Water: 0 sq mi (0 km^{2})
- Elevation: 709 ft (216 m)

Population (2010)
  - Total: 711
  - Density: 195.3/sq mi (75.4/km^{2})
- Source: 2010 Census
- Time zone: UTC−4 (AST)
- ZIP Code: 00723
- Area code: 787/939

Quebrada Arriba is a barrio in the municipality of Patillas, Puerto Rico. Its population in 2010 was 711.

== History ==
Quebrada Arriba was in Spain's gazetteers until Puerto Rico was ceded by Spain in the aftermath of the Spanish–American War under the terms of the Treaty of Paris of 1898 and became an unincorporated territory of the United States. In 1899, the United States Department of War conducted a census of Puerto Rico finding that the combined population of Quebrada Arriba and Cacao Bajo barrios was 928.

Historical population
Census	Pop.	Note	%±
1910	609		—
1920	640		5.1%
1930	658		2.8%
1940	771		17.2%
1950	747		−3.1%
1960	511		−31.6%
1970	754		47.6%
1980	862		14.3%
1990	792		−8.1%
2000	843		6.4%
2010	711		−15.7%
U.S. Decennial Census; 1900 (N/A) 1910-1930; 1930-1950 1980-2000 2010

== Sectors ==
Barrios (which are, in contemporary times, roughly comparable to minor civil divisions) in turn are further subdivided into smaller local populated place areas/units called sectores (sectors in English). The types of sectores may vary, from normally sector to urbanización to reparto to barriada to residencial, among others.

The following sectors are in Quebrada Arriba barrio:

Carretera 184, Carretera 762, Sector Fondo del Saco, Sector Las Parcelas, and Sector Los Cafeítos.

== See also ==
- List of communities in Puerto Rico
- List of barrios and sectors of Patillas, Puerto Rico
