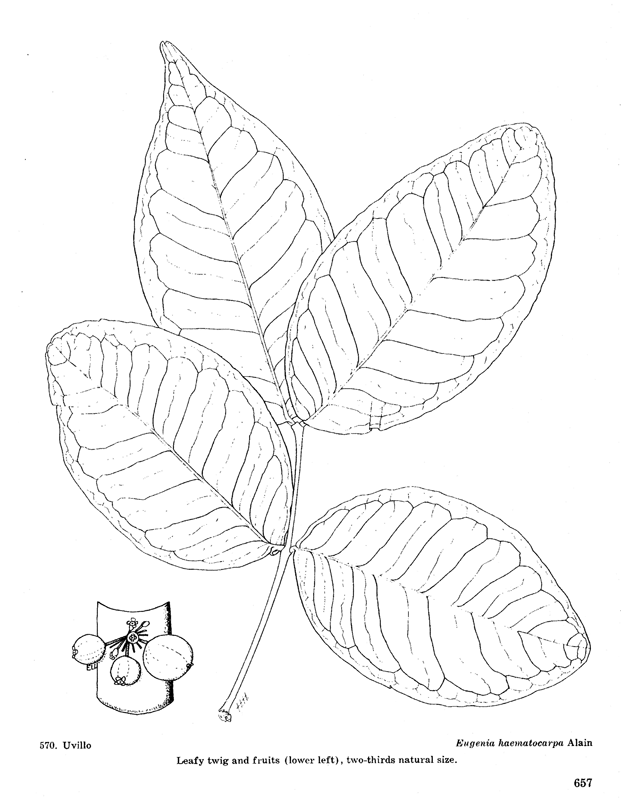

Conservation status
- Endangered (IUCN 2.3)

Scientific classification
- Kingdom: Plantae
- Clade: Tracheophytes
- Clade: Angiosperms
- Clade: Eudicots
- Clade: Rosids
- Order: Myrtales
- Family: Myrtaceae
- Genus: Eugenia
- Species: E. haematocarpa

Binomial name
- Eugenia haematocarpa Alain

= Eugenia haematocarpa =

Species of plant

Eugenia haematocarpa is a rare species of flowering plant in the family Myrtaceae. It is endemic to Puerto Rico. It is classified as an endangered species by the U.S. Fish and Wildlife Service and there has been a plan for its recovery in place for some years. Its common names include uvillo and Luquillo Mountain stopper.

Specimens of this tree were first collected in 1939 in Naguabo. It is known from the Caribbean National Forest and the Sierra de Cayey on the eastern side of the island of Puerto Rico.

It has been observed growing amongst Syzygium jambos, Prestoea montana, Tabebuia heterophylla, Ocotea leucoxylon, Inga laurina, and Alchornea latifolia in mountain forest habitat. The main cause of the tree's rarity is habitat destruction.

This is an evergreen tree growing up to 6 meters tall with gray or whitish bark that strips away in plates. The leathery oval leaves are up to 18 centimeters long and are borne in pairs. Flowers occur in clusters on the trunk and each has four pink petals just over 2 centimeters long. The fruit is a dark red berry between 2 and 3 centimeters in length.
