= Beatriz, Cayey, Puerto Rico =

Barrio of Puerto Rico

Beatriz
- Barrio
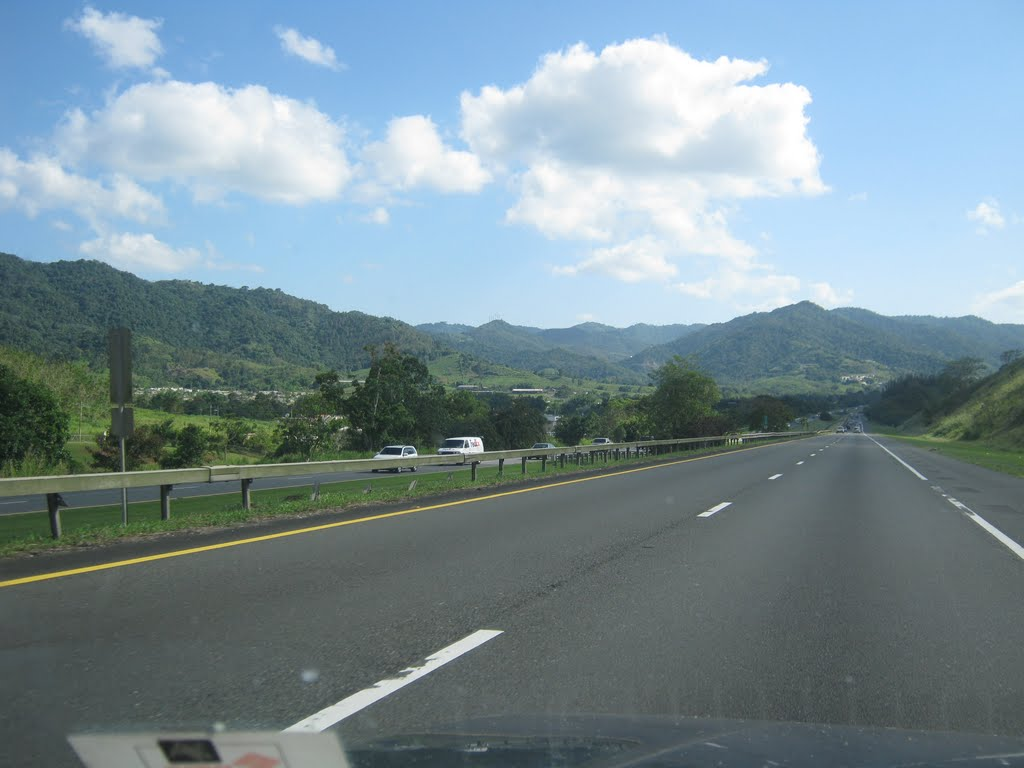
- PR-52 in Beatriz

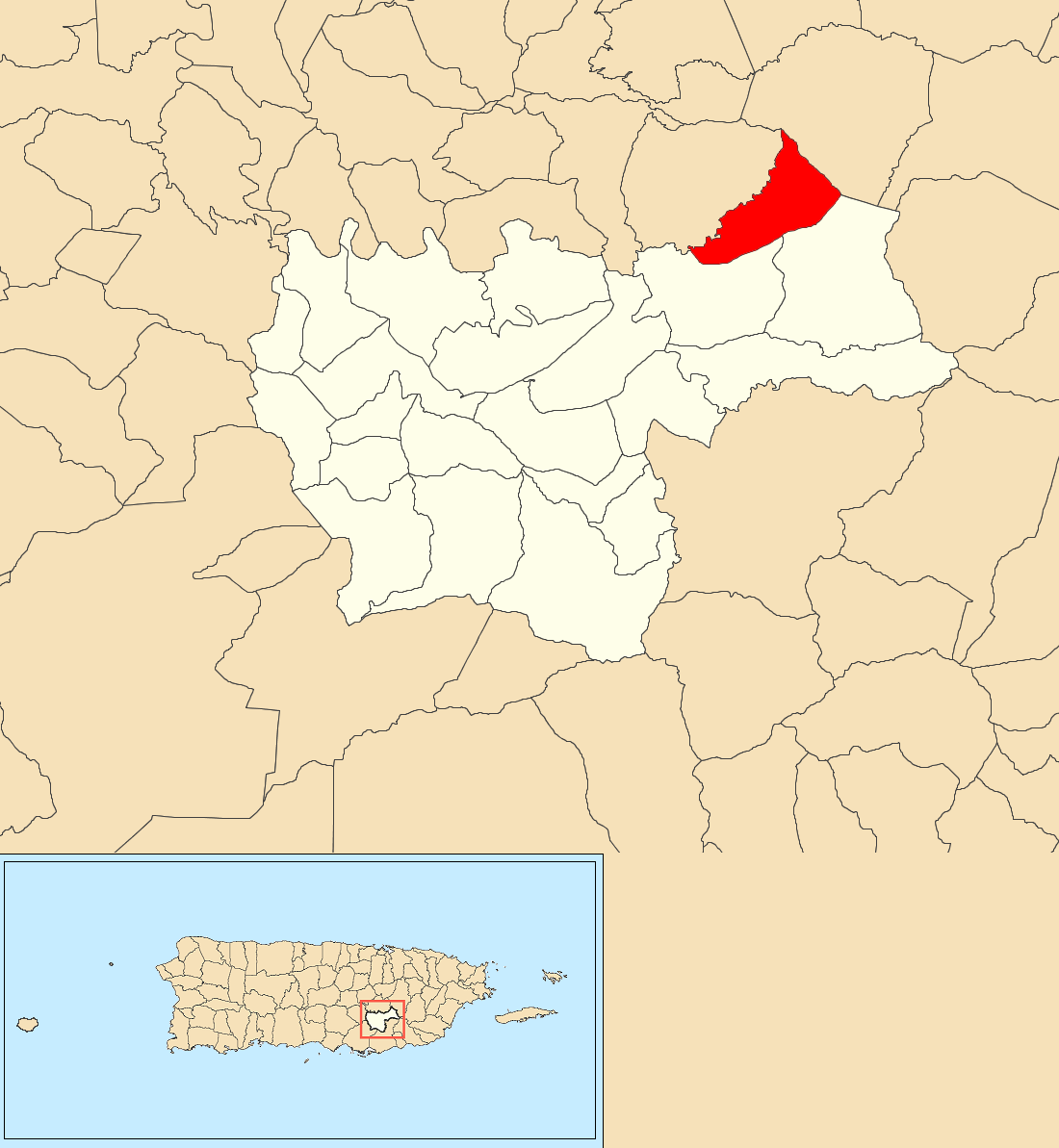
- Location of Beatriz within the municipality of Cayey shown in red

- Location of Puerto Rico
- Coordinates: 18°08′58″N 66°05′47″W
- Commonwealth: Puerto Rico
- Municipality: Cayey

Area
  - Total: 2.09 sq mi (5.4 km^{2})
  - Land: 2.09 sq mi (5.4 km^{2})
  - Water: 0 sq mi (0 km^{2})
- Elevation: 1,345 ft (410 m)

Population (2010)
  - Total: 3,027
  - Density: 1,448.3/sq mi (559.2/km^{2})
- Source: 2010 Census
- Time zone: UTC−4 (AST)

Beatriz is a barrio in the municipality of Cayey, Puerto Rico. Its population in 2010 was 3,027.

== History ==
Beatriz appeared in Spain's gazetteers until Puerto Rico was ceded by Spain in the aftermath of the Spanish–American War under the terms of the Treaty of Paris of 1898 and became an unincorporated territory of the United States. In 1899, the United States Department of War conducted a census of Puerto Rico, finding that the combined population of the barrios of Beatriz and Guavate was 853.

Historical population
Census	Pop.	Note	%±
1910	395		—
1920	740		87.3%
1930	782		5.7%
1940	1,035		32.4%
1950	741		−28.4%
1960	1,098		48.2%
1970	1,273		15.9%
1980	1,209		−5.0%
1990	1,467		21.3%
2000	1,986		35.4%
2010	3,027		52.4%
U.S. Decennial Census; 1900 (N/A) 1910-1930; 1930-1950 1980-2000 2010

== See also ==
- List of communities in Puerto Rico
