= Beatriz, Cidra, Puerto Rico =

Barrio of Puerto Rico

Beatriz
- Barrio
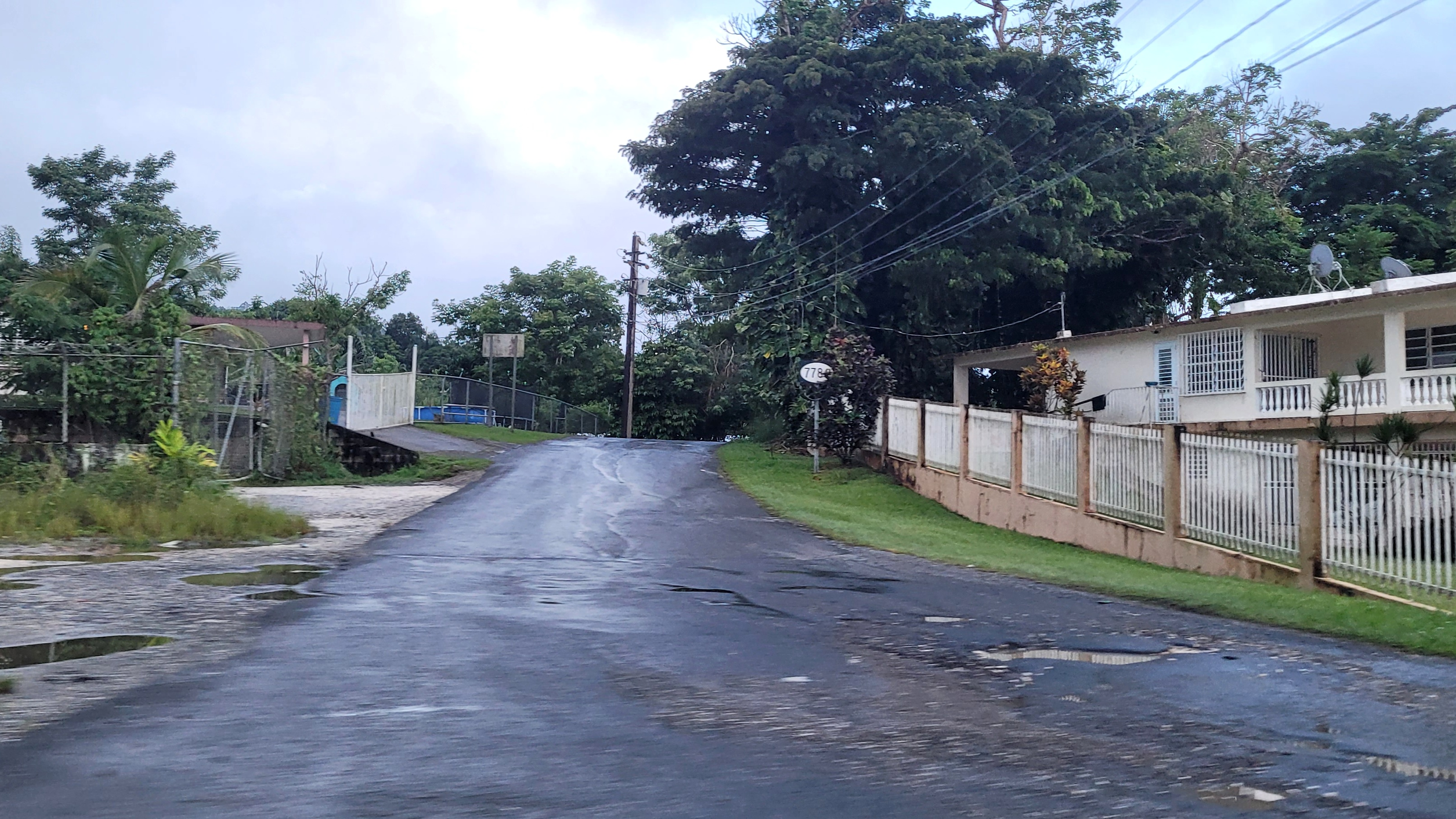
- Puerto Rico Highway 7786 in Beatriz

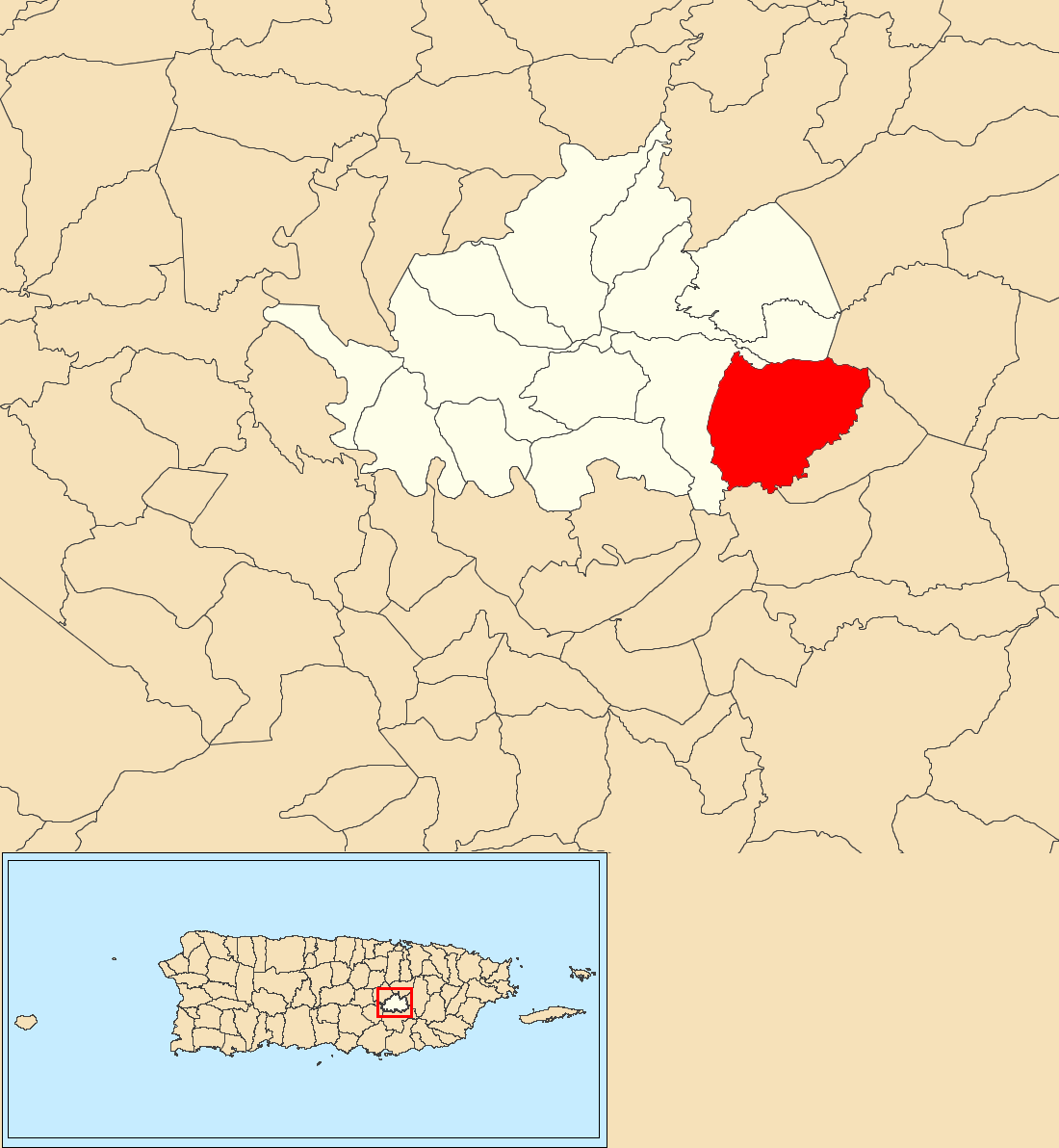
- Location of Beatriz within the municipality of Cidra shown in red

- Location of Puerto Rico
- Coordinates: 18°09′24″N 66°06′31″W
- Commonwealth: Puerto Rico
- Municipality: Cidra

Area
  - Total: 4.25 sq mi (11.0 km^{2})
  - Land: 4.24 sq mi (11.0 km^{2})
  - Water: 0.01 sq mi (0.026 km^{2})
- Elevation: 1,545 ft (471 m)

Population (2010)
  - Total: 3,095
  - Density: 730/sq mi (280/km^{2})
- Source: 2010 Census
- Time zone: UTC−4 (AST)
- ZIP Code: 00739
- Area code: 787/939

Beatriz is a barrio in the municipality of Cidra, Puerto Rico. Its population in 2010 was 3,095.

== History ==
Beatriz was in Spain's gazetteers until Puerto Rico was ceded by Spain in the aftermath of the Spanish–American War under the terms of the Treaty of Paris of 1898 and became an unincorporated territory of the United States. In 1899, the United States Department of War conducted a census of Puerto Rico finding that the combined population of Beatriz barrio and Arenas barrio was 997.

Historical population
| Census | Pop. | Note | %± |
|---|---|---|---|
| 1910 | 528 | | — |
| 1920 | 688 | | 30.3% |
| 1930 | 1,521 | | 121.1% |
| 1940 | 1,546 | | 1.6% |
| 1950 | 1,660 | | 7.4% |
| 1960 | 1,721 | | 3.7% |
| 1970 | 2,038 | | 18.4% |
| 1980 | 2,082 | | 2.2% |
| 1990 | 3,126 | | 50.1% |
| 2000 | 3,168 | | 1.3% |
| 2010 | 3,095 | | −2.3% |
U.S. Decennial Census; 1900 (N/A) 1910-1930; 1930-1950 1980-2000 2010

== Sectors ==
Barrios (which are, in contemporary times, roughly comparable to minor civil divisions) in turn are further subdivided into smaller local populated place areas/units called sectores (sectors in English). The types of sectores may vary, from normally sector to urbanización to reparto to barriada to residencial, among others.

The following sectors are in Beatriz barrio:

Beatriz Carr, Camino Cristo de La Roca, Camino Isidro Acosta, Camino Real, Los Soto, Monte Verde (Colinas), Parcelas Nuevas, Quintas de Monticello, Sector Bambú, Sector Brisas del Plata, Sector Campito, Sector Centeno Quiles, Sector Chavón, Sector Clavijo, Sector Colinas de Beatriz I y II, Sector Colinas Del Capitán, Sector El Llano, Sector Huertas, Sector Juan González (Sector Mero), Sector La Bomba, Sector La Vega, Sector Las Cruces, Sector Los Gómez, Sector Ortíz, Sector Pesquera, Sector Rodríguez, Sector Sapera (Valle Verde), Sector Sapera Adentro, Sector Virginia, Urbanización Brisas de Montecarlo, Urbanización Colinas Verdes, and Urbanización Valle de Beatriz.

== See also ==
- List of communities in Puerto Rico
- List of barrios and sectors of Cidra, Puerto Rico
