= Carite Lake =

Lake in Guayama, Puerto Rico

Lago Carite
- Location within Puerto Rico
- Location: Guayama, Puerto Rico
- Coordinates: 18.0766290°N 66.1057212°W
- Type: reservoir
- Basin countries: Puerto Rico
- Surface area: 0.47 m^{2} (5.1 sq ft)
- References: USGS: GNIS Detail - Lago Carite.

Lake Carite (Spanish: Lago Carite) is a reservoir of the La Plata River located in the municipality of Guayama on the main island of Puerto Rico. The lake was created in 1913 by the Porto Rico Irrigation Service for the purpose of providing potable water to southeastern Puerto Rico.

The lake is located near the farthest source of the La Plata river basin and is open for recreational fishing and boating. Together with the nearby Carite State Forest, the lake and its surroundings have been recognized as an Important Bird Area by BirdLife International since 2004.

== See also ==
- List of dams and reservoirs in Puerto Rico
