= Garrochales =

Garrochales may refer to:

== Places ==
- Garrochales, Arecibo, Puerto Rico, a barrio
- Garrochales, Barceloneta, Puerto Rico, a barrio
