= Florida Afuera, Barceloneta, Puerto Rico =

Barrio of Puerto Rico

Florida Afuera
- Barrio
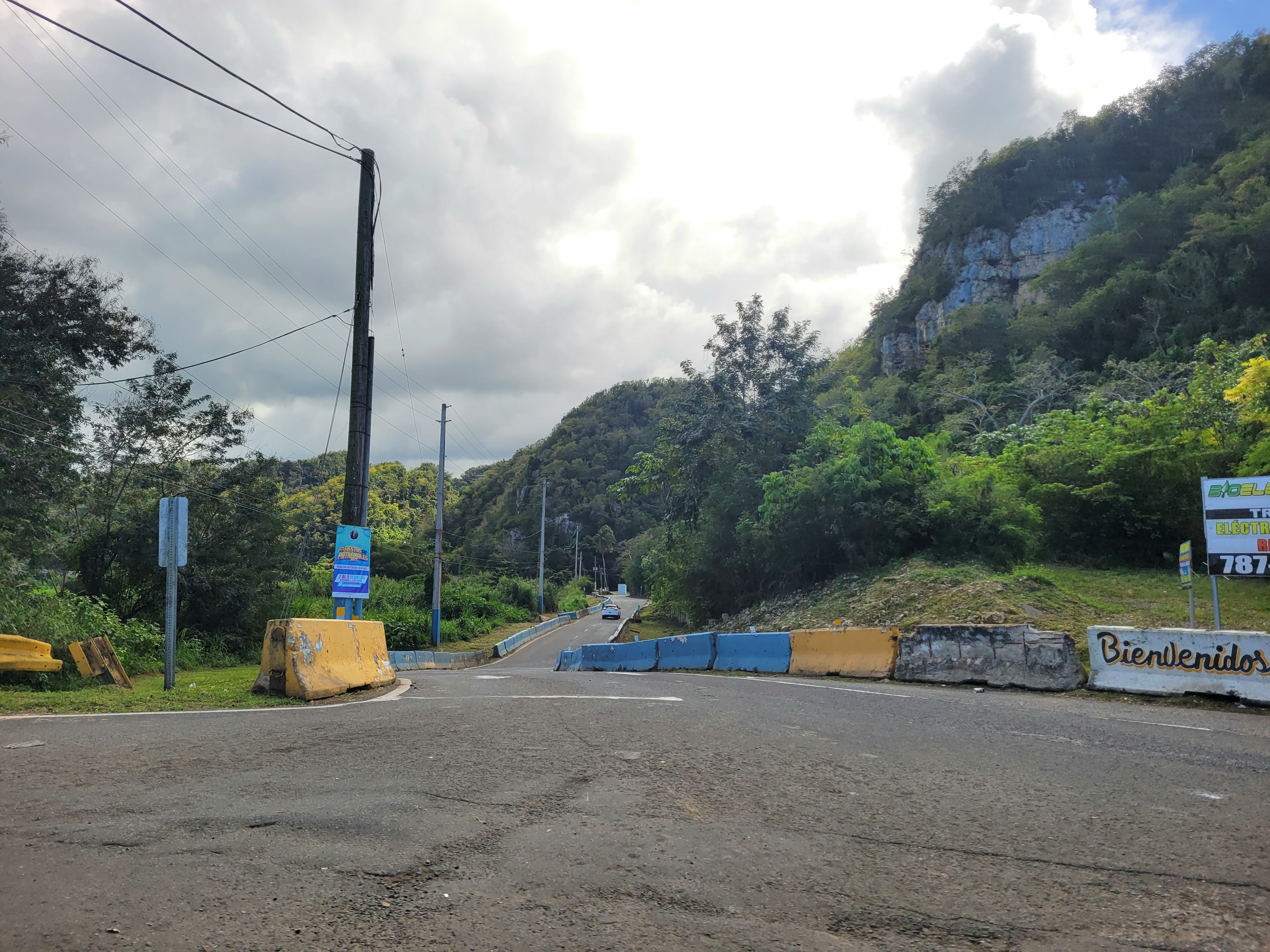
- Puerto Rico Highway 666 in Florida Afuera

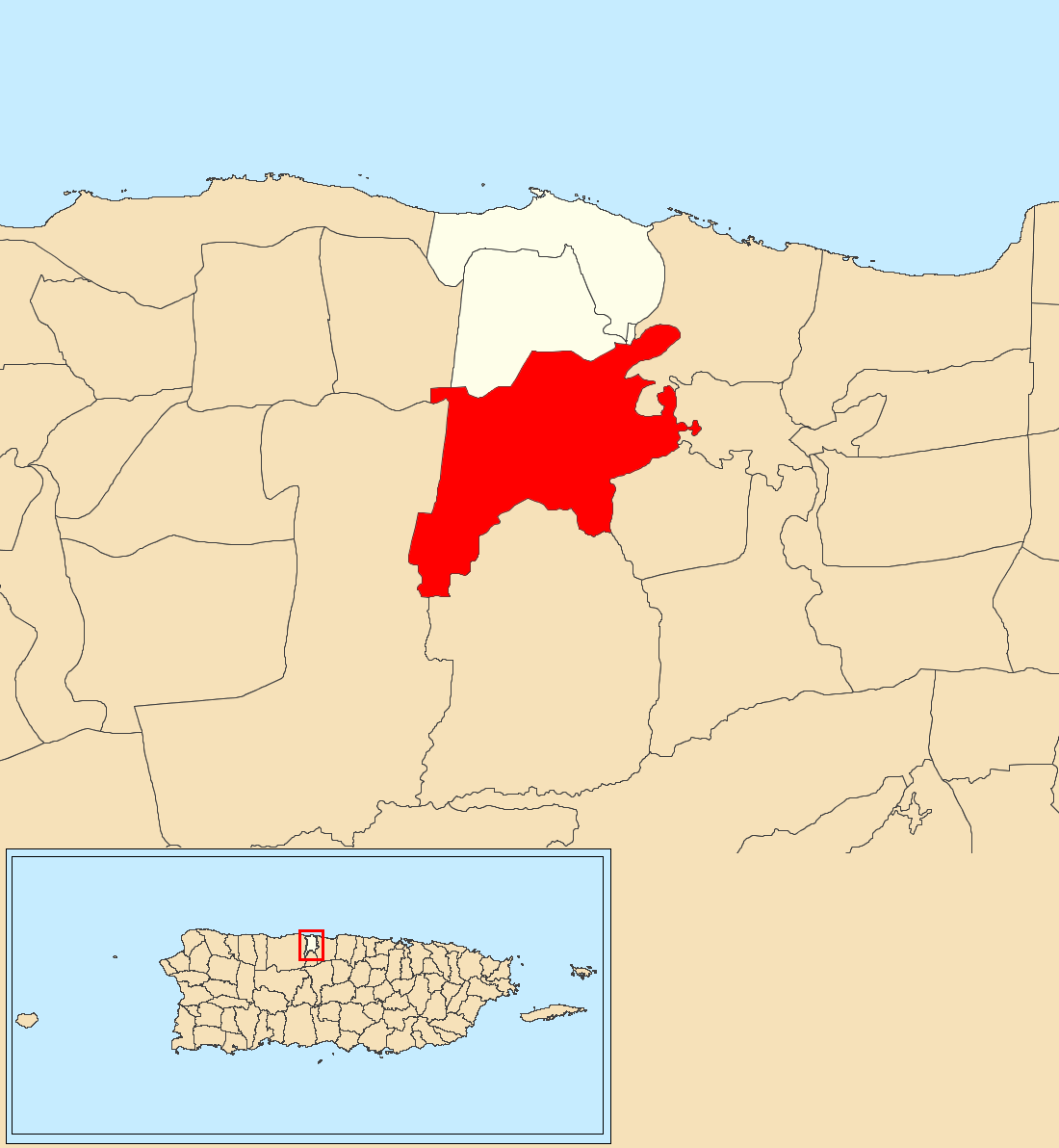
- Location of Florida Afuera within the municipality of Barceloneta shown in red

- Location of Puerto Rico
- Coordinates: 18°25′16″N 66°32′59″W
- Commonwealth: Puerto Rico
- Municipality: Barceloneta

Area
  - Total: 9.87 sq mi (25.6 km^{2})
  - Land: 9.87 sq mi (25.6 km^{2})
  - Water: 0.00 sq mi (0 km^{2})
- Elevation: 246 ft (75 m)

Population (2010)
  - Total: 16,061
  - Density: 695.7/sq mi (268.6/km^{2})
- Source: 2010 Census
- Time zone: UTC−4 (AST)
- ZIP Code: 00617
- Area code: 787/939

Florida Afuera is a barrio in the municipality of Barceloneta, Puerto Rico. Its population in 2010 was 16,061.

== History ==
Florida Afuera was in Spain's gazetteers until Puerto Rico was ceded by Spain in the aftermath of the Spanish–American War under the terms of the Treaty of Paris of 1898 and became an unincorporated territory of the United States. In 1899, the United States Department of War conducted a census of Puerto Rico finding that the population of Florida Afuera barrio was 3,579.

Historical population
Census	Pop.	Note	%±
1900	3,579		—
1910	4,695		31.2%
1920	5,737		22.2%
1930	6,007		4.7%
1940	6,137		2.2%
1950	9,254		50.8%
1960	9,911		7.1%
1970	0		−100.0%
1980	12,294		—
1990	14,351		16.7%
2000	12,969		−9.6%
2010	16,061		23.8%
U.S. Decennial Census; 1899 (shown as 1900) 1910-1930; 1930-1950 1980-2000 2010

== Gallery ==
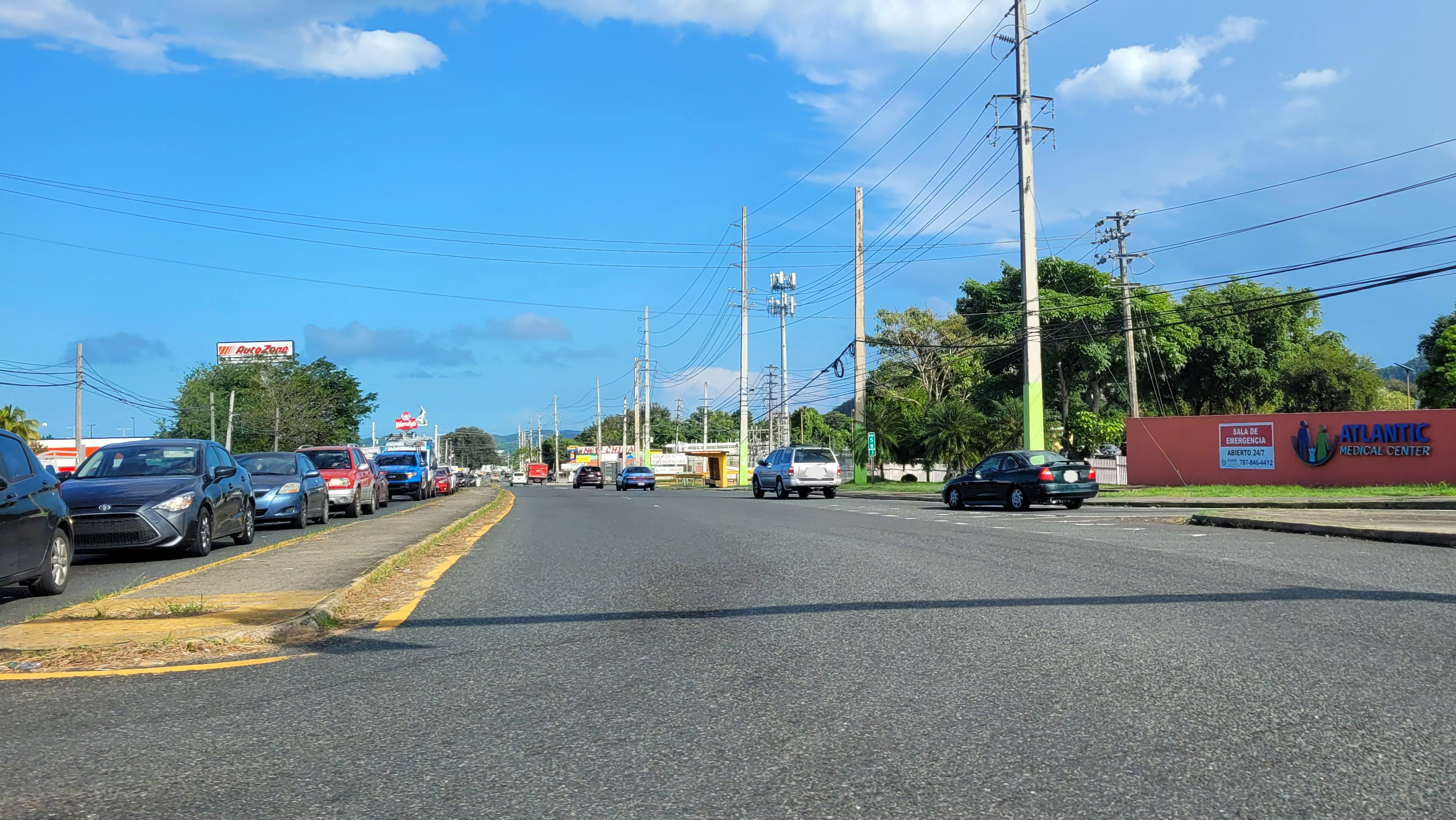
Puerto Rico Highway 2 in Florida Afuera

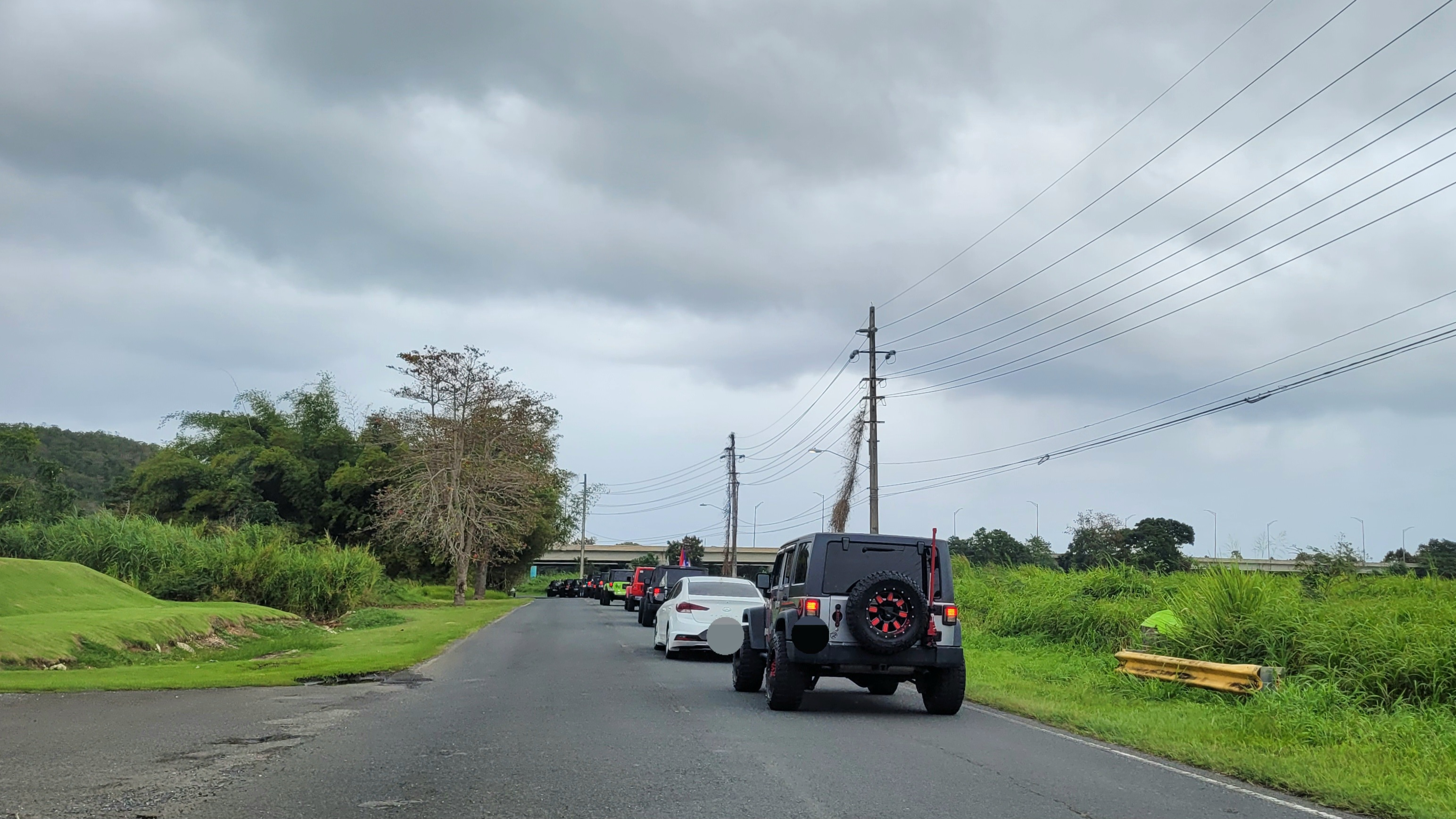
Puerto Rico Highway 6140 in Florida Afuera

== See also ==
- List of communities in Puerto Rico
