= Sol Luis Fontanes =

Puerto Rican politician

Sol Luis Fontanes Olivo

Mayor of Barceloneta, Puerto Rico
- In office May 6, 1986 – March 1, 2012
- Preceded by: Héctor Ruíz Martínez
- Succeeded by: Wanda Soler Rosario

Personal details
- Born: October 13, 1949 (age 76) Barceloneta, Puerto Rico
- Party: Popular Democratic Party (PPD)
- Spouse: Elsa Pérez Sánchez (1972-present)
- Children: Mirelsa; Sol Luis
- Education: University of Puerto Rico (B.A.); Interamerican University of Puerto Rico (M.A.)
- Occupation: Politician

Sol Luis Fontanes Olivo (born October 13, 1949, in Barceloneta, Puerto Rico) is a Puerto Rican politician and former mayor of Barceloneta. He was one of the longest tenured mayors of the island, spending 26 years in office. He is currently incarcerated for charges of corruption.

== Early years and studies ==
Fontanes was born on October 13, 1949, in Barceloneta, Puerto Rico, to Félix Fontanes and María Olivo. He studied in his hometown, graduating from high school in 1967. Fontánes then studied at the University of Puerto Rico, receiving a Bachelor's degree in 1972. He completed a Master's degree from the Interamerican University of Puerto Rico in 1974.

== Professional career ==
Fontanes worked as a teacher for several years. He also worked as Director of the Prevention Center of the Department of Anti-Addiction Services.

== Political career ==
Fontanes became mayor of Barceloneta in 1986 after the death of Mayor Héctor Ruíz Martínez and was re-elected six times. For the 2008 general election, Fontanes received more than 70% of the votes, for one of the largest margins of victory that year.

== Arrest ==
On February 15, 2012, Fontanes was arrested by the FBI and indicted on one charge of extortion. He resigned his office on March 1, 2012. In October 2012, he was sentenced to 10 years in prison. On January 24, 2013, Fontanes pled guilty and was sentenced to thirteen years in prison, to be served concurrently.

Fontanes was incarcerated at FCI Petersburg Low Federal Jail in Virginia. His inmate number is 38753–069 with a release date of August 22, 2020 and is currently listed as being located at the Miami Residential Reentry Management (RRM).

== Personal life ==
Fontanes has been married to Elsa Pérez Sánchez since 1972. They have two children: Mirelsa and Sol Luis.
