= Palmas Altas, Barceloneta, Puerto Rico =

Barrio of Puerto Rico

Palmas Altas
- Barrio
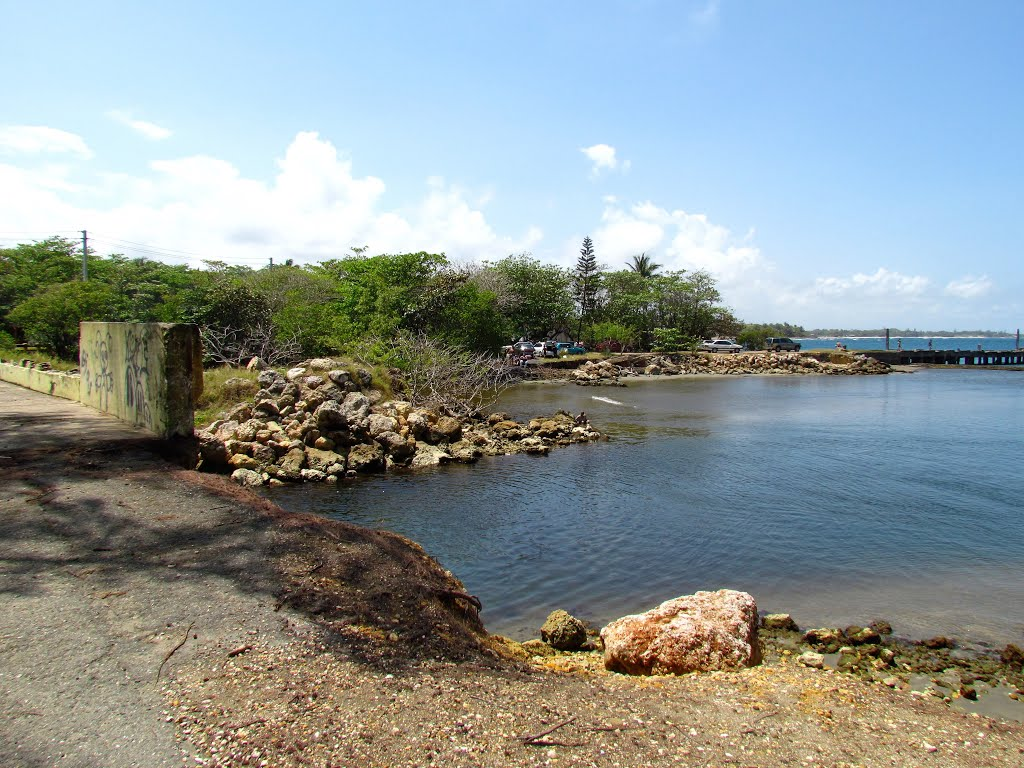
- Area near Isla Roque in Palmas Altas

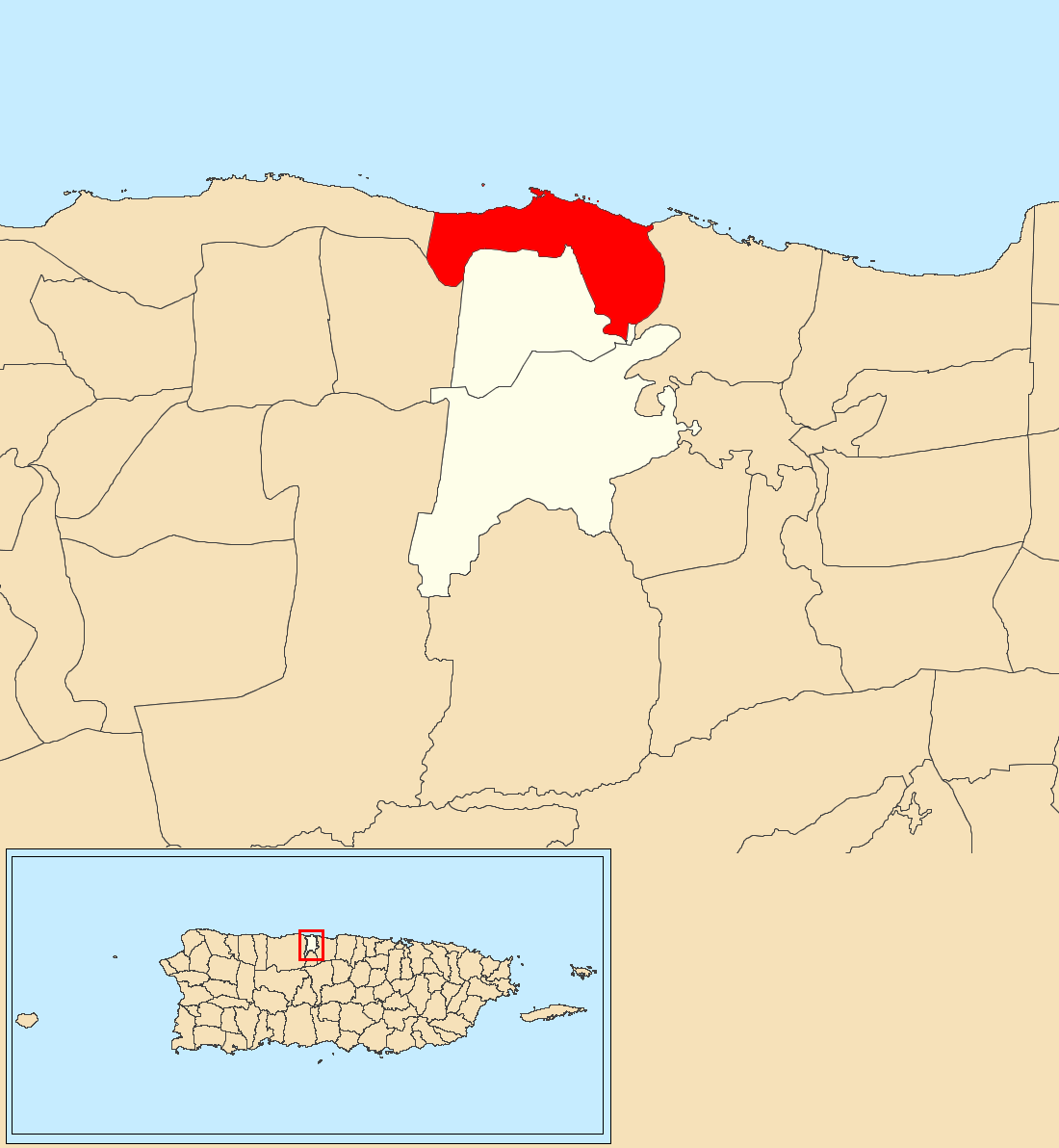
- Location of Palmas Altas within the municipality of Barceloneta shown in red

- Location of Puerto Rico
- Coordinates: 18°28′35″N 66°33′41″W
- Commonwealth: Puerto Rico
- Municipality: Barceloneta

Area
  - Total: 5.88 sq mi (15.2 km^{2})
  - Land: 4.32 sq mi (11.2 km^{2})
  - Water: 1.56 sq mi (4.0 km^{2})
- Elevation: 0 ft (0 m)

Population (2010)
  - Total: 3,778
  - Density: 388/sq mi (150/km^{2})
- Source: 2010 Census
- Time zone: UTC−4 (AST)
- ZIP Code: 00617
- Area code: 787/939

Palmas Altas is a barrio in the municipality of Barceloneta, Puerto Rico. Its population in 2010 was 3,778.

== History ==
Palmas Altas was in Spain's gazetteers until Puerto Rico was ceded by Spain in the aftermath of the Spanish–American War under the terms of the Treaty of Paris of 1898 and became an unincorporated territory of the United States. In 1899, the United States Department of War conducted a census of Puerto Rico finding that the population of Palmas Altas barrio was 1,259.

Historical population
Census	Pop.	Note	%±
1900	1,259		—
1910	1,316		4.5%
1920	1,470		11.7%
1930	1,493		1.6%
1940	1,655		10.9%
1950	2,279		37.7%
1960	2,402		5.4%
1970	0		−100.0%
1980	2,944		—
1990	3,364		14.3%
2000	3,875		15.2%
2010	3,778		−2.5%
U.S. Decennial Census; 1899 (shown as 1900) 1910-1930; 1930-1950 1980-2000 2010

== Gallery ==
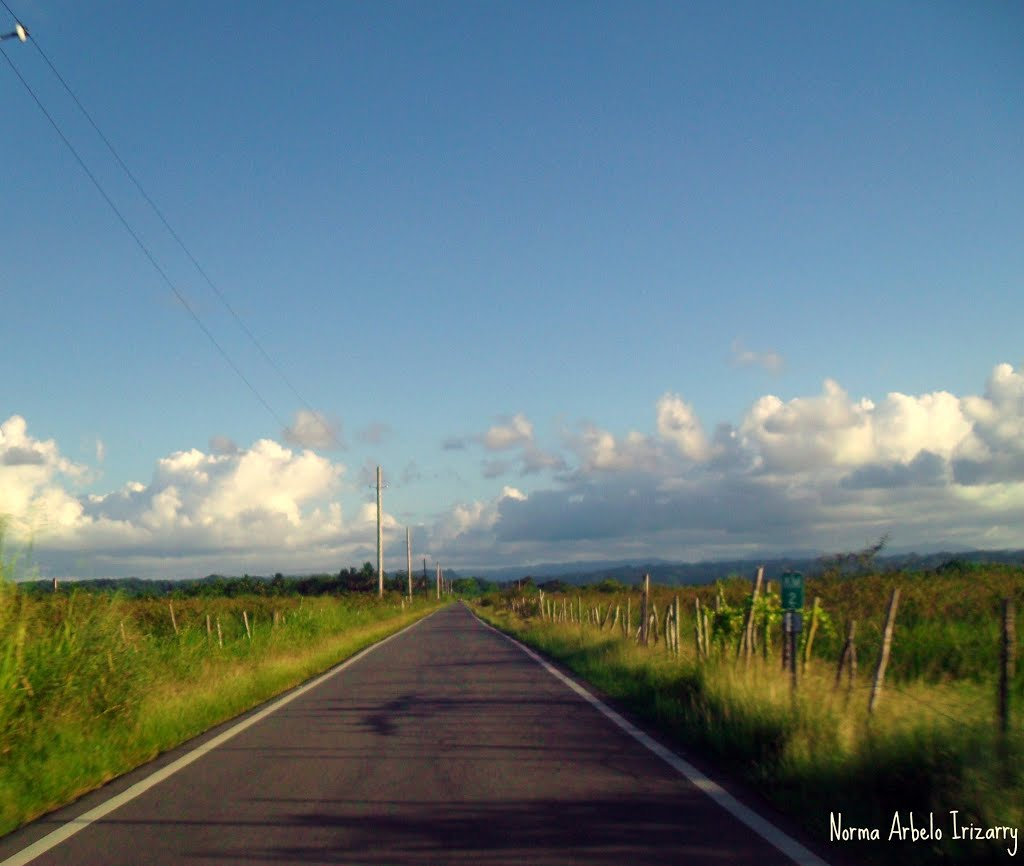
From Palmas Altas towards Barceloneta

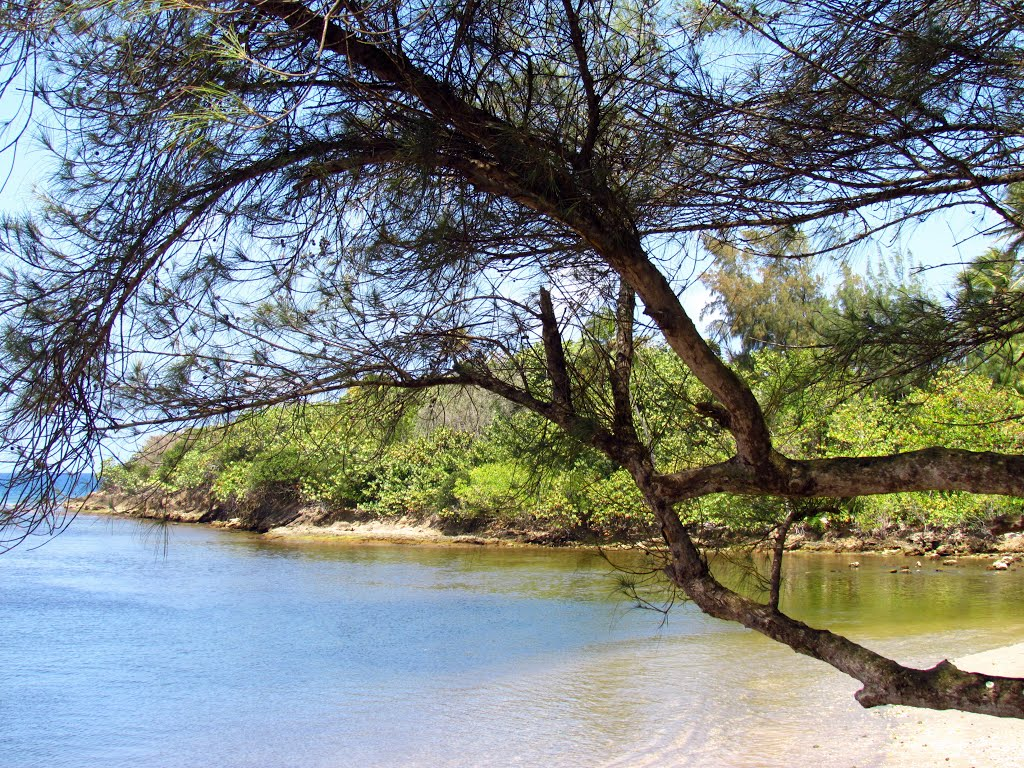
Beach at Palmas Altas

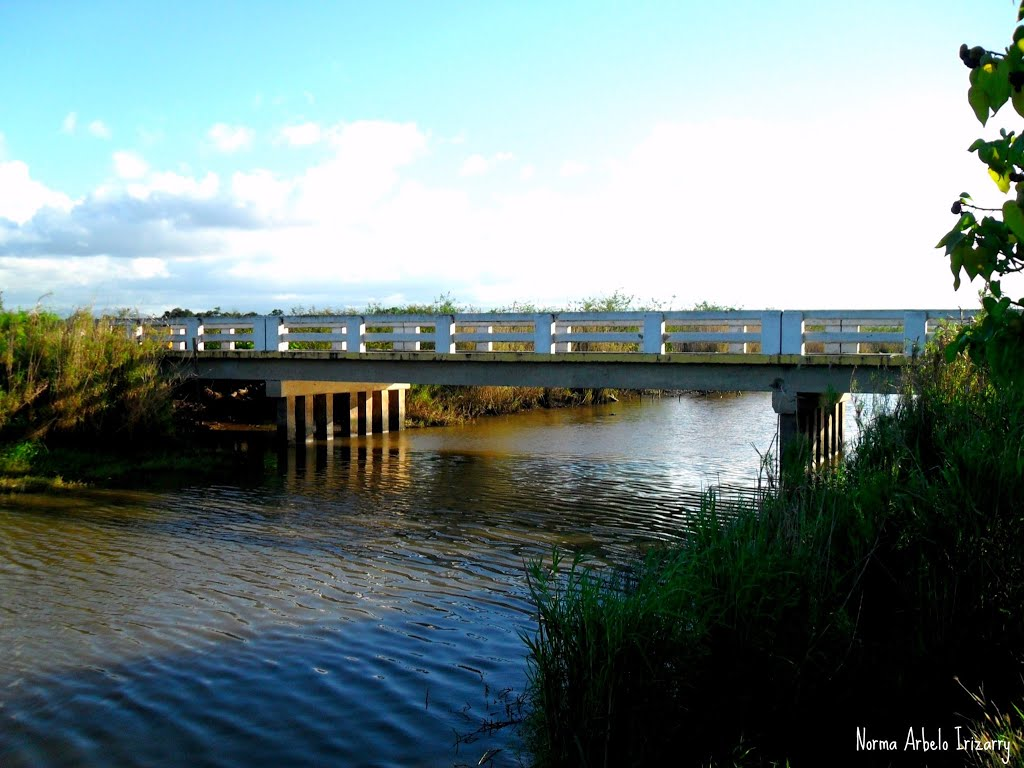
Small bridge in Palmas Altas

== See also ==
- List of communities in Puerto Rico
