= Barceloneta, Puerto Rico =

Town and municipality in Puerto Rico

Barceloneta Municipio Autónomo de Barceloneta
- Town and Municipality
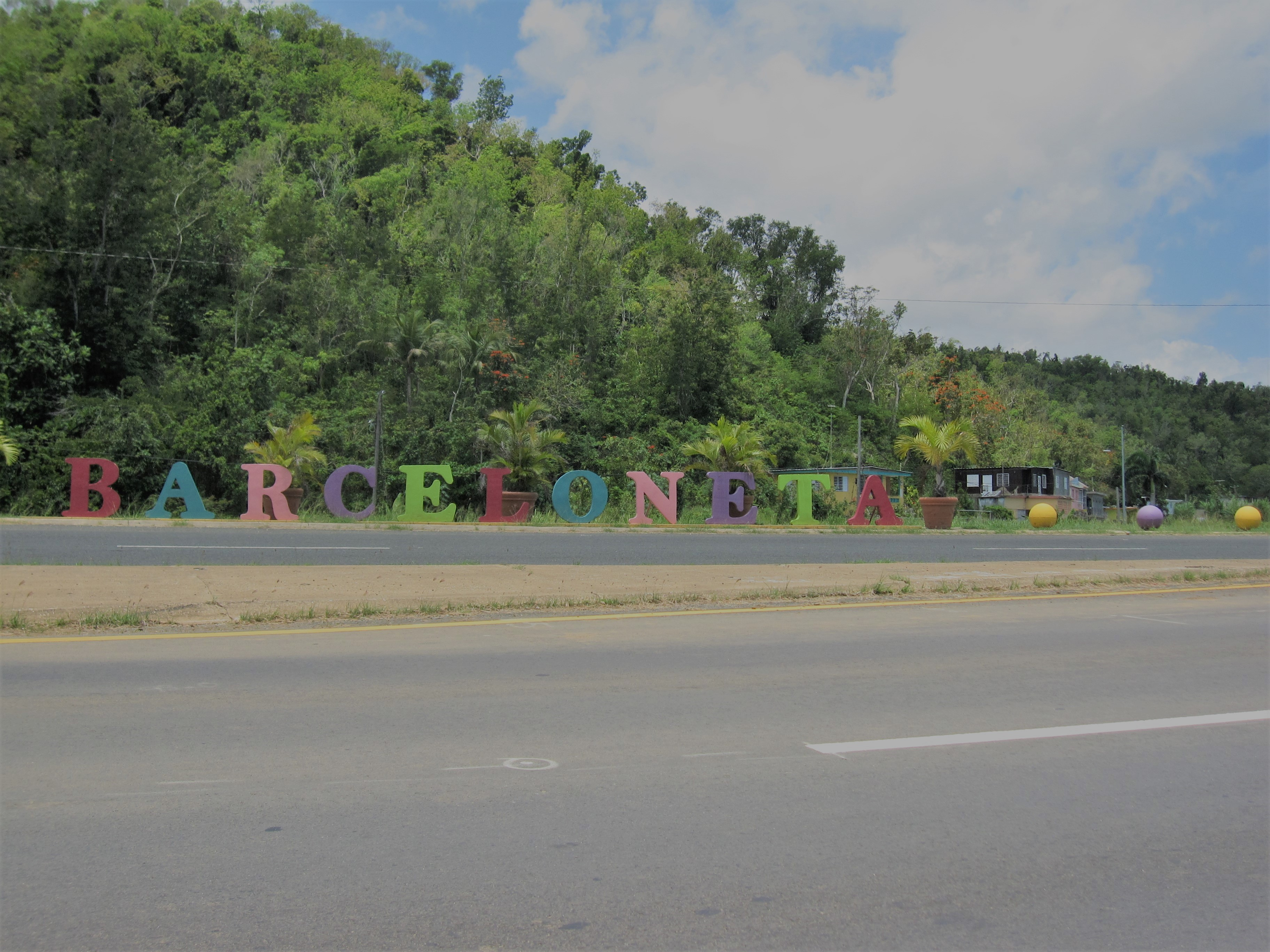
- Barceloneta in letters sculpture

- Flag Coat of arms
- Nicknames: "La Ciudad de las Piñas", "La Ciudad Industrial," "El Pueblo de los Indios", "El Pueblo de Sixto Escobar"
- Anthem: "Querido Barceloneta"
- Map of Puerto Rico highlighting Barceloneta Municipality
- Coordinates: 18°27′02″N 66°32′19″W
- Sovereign state: United States
- Commonwealth: Puerto Rico
- Settled: early 19th century
- Founded: July 1, 1881
- Founder: Bonocio Llenza Feliú
- Named for: Barcelona
- Barrios: 4 barrios: Barceloneta barrio-pueblo; Florida Afuera; Garrochales; Palmas Altas

Government
  - Mayor: Wanda Soler (PPD)
  - Senatorial dist.: 3 - Arecibo
  - Representative dist.: 13

Area
  - Total: 36.39 sq mi (94.24 km^{2})
  - Land: 32 sq mi (82 km^{2})
  - Water: 4.73 sq mi (12.24 km^{2})

Population (2020)
  - Total: 22,657
  - Estimate (2025): 22,316 ▼
  - Rank: 56th in Puerto Rico
  - Density: 720/sq mi (280/km^{2})
- Demonym: Barcelonetences
- Time zone: UTC−4 (AST)
- ZIP Code: 00617
- Area code: 787/939

Barceloneta (Spanish pronunciation: [baɾseloˈneta], locally [baɭseloˈneta]) is a town and municipality in Puerto Rico located in the north region, bordering the Atlantic Ocean, north of Florida (city and municipality in Puerto Rico), east of Arecibo, and west of Manatí. Barceloneta is spread over 3 barrios and Barceloneta Pueblo (the downtown area and the administrative center of the city). It is part of the San Juan-Caguas-Guaynabo Metropolitan Statistical Area.

== Etymology ==
The name of Barceloneta ("Little Barcelona") is derived from the Catalan city, from where the town's founder originated. Barceloneta is also the name of a beach and neighborhood of Barcelona.

== History ==
Barceloneta was founded on July 1, 1881 by Bonoci Llençà Feliu, an immigrant from Barcelona, Catalonia. Barceloneta was one of the last municipalities created by the Spanish Government in Puerto Rico.

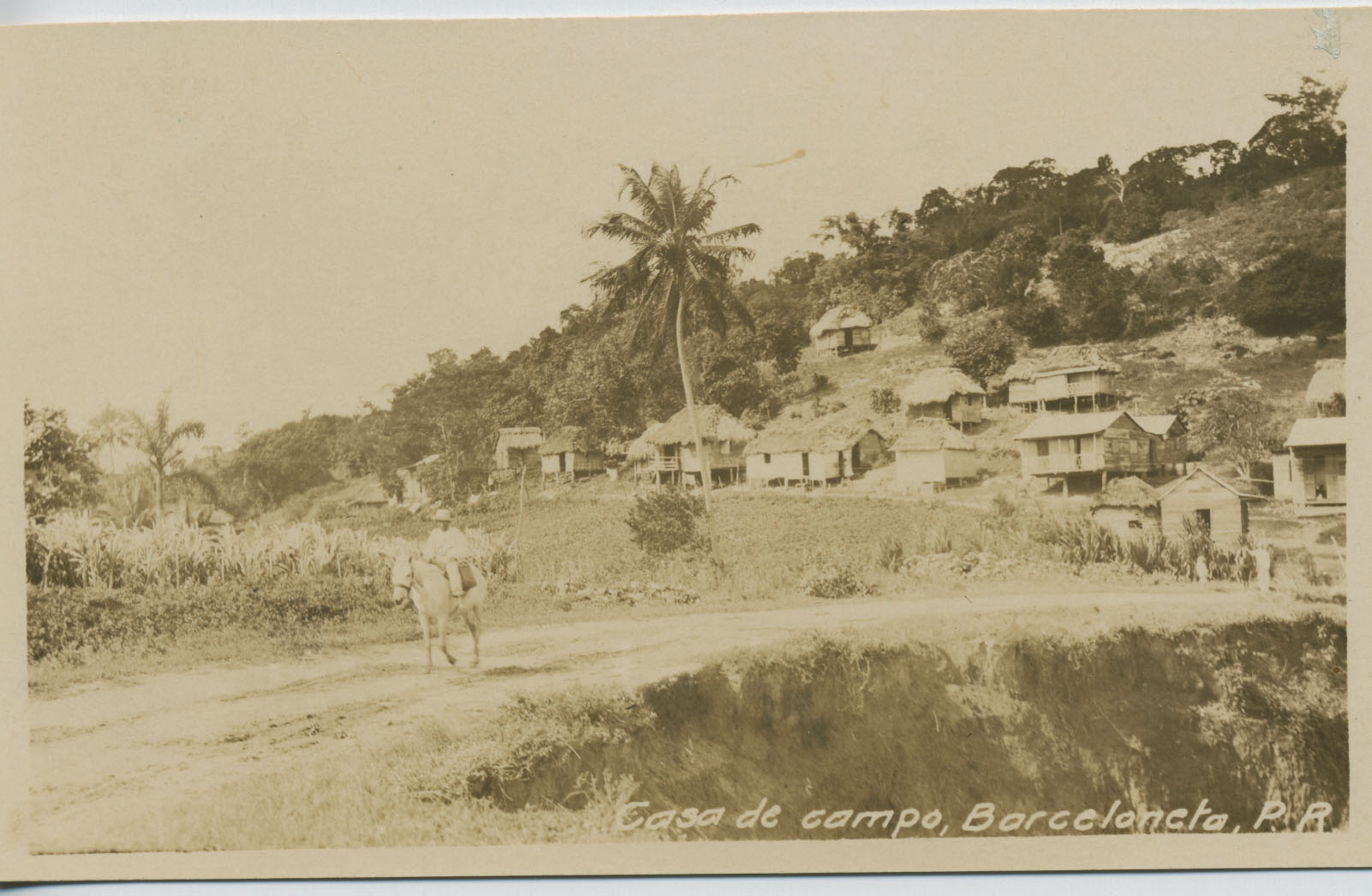
Homes in the countryside of Barceloneta in the early 20th century

Puerto Rico was ceded by Spain in the aftermath of the Spanish–American War under the terms of the Treaty of Paris of 1898 and became a territory of the United States. In 1899, the United States conducted its first census of Puerto Rico finding that the population of Barceloneta was 9,357.

About a decade after its foundation, the town had a significant economic development led by agriculture and industry. By 1894, there were three sugarcane estates, 93 sugar mills, and the production of other fruits. Because of its location next to the Río Grande de Manatí, Barceloneta was known for many years as a site of important port activity, for shipment of sugar and salt, as well as passengers to New York City and Barcelona. Bonoci's son was the owner of a sail ship that made those routes.

In 1899, Barceloneta requested to be annexed to the town of Manatí. An election was scheduled for August 14, 1899 to decide the matter. However, on August 8, the island suffered the effects of Hurricane San Ciriaco, which prevented the elections from being held. The following year, Governor George Whitefield Davis ordered the annexation of Barceloneta into Manatí. The annexation was short-lived. Eleven years later, the government reinstated Barceloneta as a municipality.

After Central Plazuela, a large sugar cane mill, closed in 1963, Barceloneta started reinforcing its agricultural economy with pineapples and other minor fruits. Efforts to revive the economy were not too successful, until pharmaceutical industries established themselves in the town during the 1970s. For a time, Barceloneta supplied all of the Viagra for North America.

Hurricane Maria struck Puerto Rico on September 20, 2017 causing large-scale damage and destruction to infrastructure. In Barceloneta, some homes and establishments along the coast were flooded with up to 15 feet of water, and nearly all wooden homes were destroyed.

== Geography ==
The Municipality of Barceloneta sits on the Northern Karst region of Puerto Rico, on the shores of the Atlantic Ocean. It is bordered by the municipalities of Arecibo, Florida, and Manatí. In terms of physical features, the municipality occupies a roughly rectangular area in the northern coast of the island. It has a surface area of 36.4 square miles (94.24 km2).

Barceloneta's terrain is predominantly plain. Since it is located in the karst region, it features hills, ponors, and caves. Near the coast, the terrain is occupied by the Caño Tiburones wetlands.

Updated flood zone maps (as of 2019) show that Barceloneta is extremely vulnerable to flooding, along with Humacao, Rincón, Toa Baja, and Corozal. For its many wetlands, Barceloneta ends up being extremely vulnerable when hit by a major hurricane.

=== Water features ===
The Río Grande de Manatí travels across the municipalities of Manatí and Barceloneta and drains into the Atlantic Ocean. Barceloneta also features the Caño Tiburones, a natural reserve.

=== Barrios ===
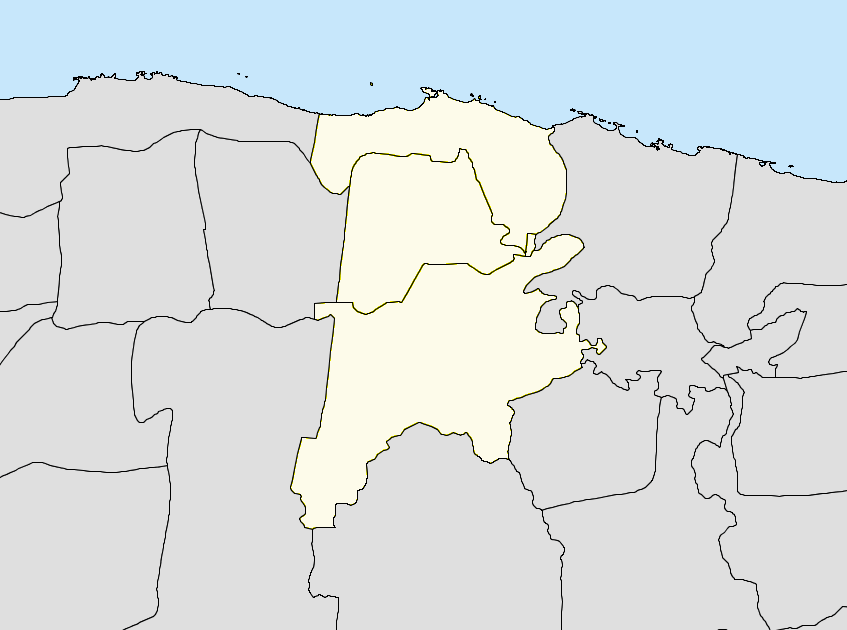
Barrios of Barceloneta

Like all municipalities of Puerto Rico, Barceloneta is subdivided into barrios. The municipal buildings, central square and large Catholic church are located in a small barrio referred to as "el pueblo", near the center of the municipality.

1. Barceloneta barrio-pueblo
2. Florida Afuera
3. Garrochales
4. Palmas Altas

=== Sectors ===
Barrios (which are, in contemporary times, roughly comparable to minor civil divisions) and subbarrios, are further subdivided into smaller areas called sectores (sectors in English). The types of sectores may vary, from normally sector to urbanización to reparto to barriada to residencial, among others.

=== Special Communities ===
Comunidades Especiales de Puerto Rico (Special Communities of Puerto Rico) are marginalized communities whose citizens are experiencing a certain amount of social exclusion. A map shows these communities occur in nearly every municipality of the commonwealth. Of the 742 places that were on the list in 2014, the following barrios, communities, sectors, or neighborhoods were in Barceloneta: Abra del Pimiento, Abra los Caballos, Cité Sector in Garrochales, Palenque, and Seboruco.

== Tourism ==
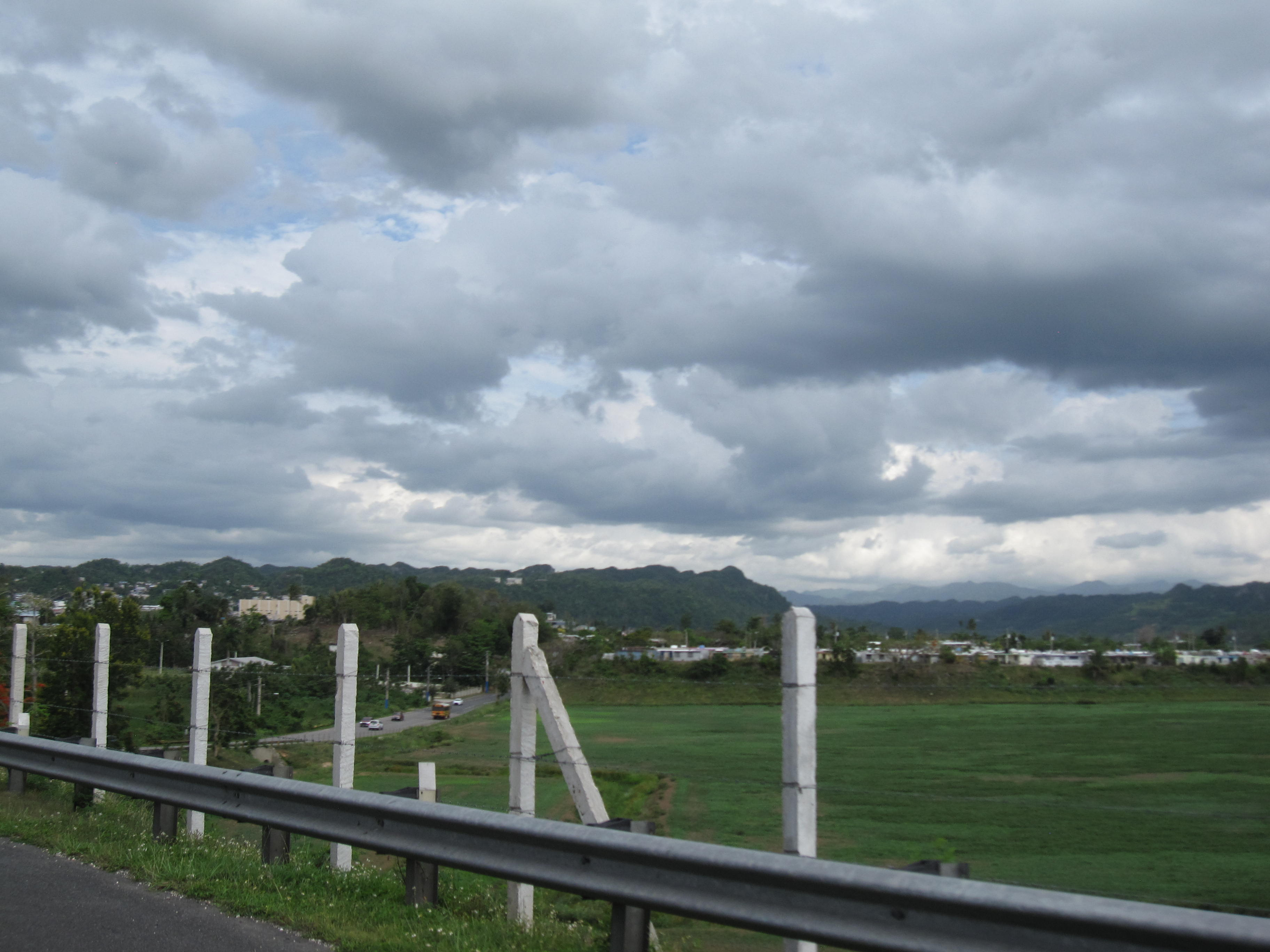
Scenic drive past the Barceloneta Outlets on PR-22

=== Landmarks and places of interest ===
There are six beaches in Barceloneta including a black sand beach called Machuca.

Barceloneta has many places of interest.

- Antiguo Muelle (the old seaport)
- Cambalache Forest Reserve
- Caño Tiburones marshland
- La Monserrate Refinery Ruins
- Las Criollas Beach
- Marqués de la Esperanza Hacienda Ruins
- Palmas Altas Beach
- Sixto Escobar Museum
- Centro Cultural de Barceloneta: Located in the heart of the city, the museum is dedicated to the culture and history of Barceloneta. Also features a collection of archaeological artifacts and Taino pieces.

To stimulate local tourism during the COVID-19 pandemic in Puerto Rico, the Puerto Rico Tourism Company launched the Voy Turistiendo (I'm Touring) campaign in 2021. The campaign featured a passport book with a page for each municipality. The Voy Turisteando Barceloneta passport page lists Malecón de la Boca, Antiguo Hospital Bonocio Llenza Feliú, La Mirada del Taíno, Semilla (for agritourism), and Playa Arena Negra, as places of interest.

== Culture ==
=== Festivals ===
Barceloneta celebrates its patron saint festival in mid-July, generally from Wednesday to Sunday. The Fiestas Patronales de la Virgen del Carmen is a religious and cultural celebration that generally features parades, games, artisans, amusement rides, regional food, and live entertainment. The festival has featured live performances by well-known artists such as Odilio González, La Sonora Ponceña, Pedro Capó, Andrés Jiménez, José Alberto "El Canario" and Tito Nieves.

== Economy ==
Barceloneta has the biggest pharmaceutical complex in the world (14 industries). These companies have chosen Barceloneta to establish their facilities for its underground water reservoirs. The water in Barceloneta requires very little treatment for use in the manufacturing of pharmaceutical products.

The employment created by these companies, along with a well-developed plan for urban growth, has allowed Barceloneta to be more than simply a town where people go to work. Puerto Rico Premium Outlets, near the expressway, have made the town into a destination for shopping and consumerism and consequently a place for investment in food chains and entertainment. Increased employment opportunities have also caused an increase in population in Barceloneta and its surrounding municipalities.

Barceloneta is also known for its black sand beaches.

== Demographics ==
Historical population
Census	Pop.	Note	%±
1900	9,357		—
1910	11,644		24.4%
1920	13,442		15.4%
1930	15,751		17.2%
1940	18,545		17.7%
1950	19,897		7.3%
1960	19,334		−2.8%
1970	20,792		7.5%
1980	18,942		−8.9%
1990	20,947		10.6%
2000	22,322		6.6%
2010	24,816		11.2%
2020	22,657		−8.7%
2025 (est.)	22,316	▼	−1.5%
U.S. Decennial Census; 1899 (shown as 1900) 1910-1930; 1930-1950 1960-2000 2010 2020

== Government ==
Barceloneta is known for its political stability. Mayor Sol Luis Fontanes held the mayor's seat for the Popular Democratic Party (PPD) from 1986 until 2012. He assumed the role after the sudden death of elected mayor Héctor Ruíz Martínez, also of the PPD. After that, Fontánes was elected by only a narrow margin (49.2% vs. 48.6%), but he gained popularity with time. At the 2008 general elections, Fontánes received more than 70% of the votes and his margin of victory was one of the biggest of that election. However, on 2012, Fontánes was arrested on charges of extortion, after 24 years as mayor. He resigned on March 1, 2012 while in prison. In 2012, Wanda Soler was elected as Fontánes replacement. She was reelected in 2024 for her fourth term.

The city belongs to the Puerto Rico Senatorial district III, which is represented by two senators. In 2024, Brenda Pérez Soto and Gabriel González were elected as District Senators.

== Names and symbols ==
The municipio has an official flag and coat of arms.

=== Flag ===
The flag of Barceloneta is a variation of the flag of Barcelona in Catalonia, from where the town borrows its name. It features four fields, two of them bearing the cross of Saint George (in Catalan, Sant Jordi), with five red and yellow bars in vertical direction to the right of each cross. These are all symbols pertaining to the city of Barcelona, and the community of Catalonia, where it is located, since the town was founded by a Catalan immigrant. The remaining two fields in the flag are blue, representing the Atlantic Ocean, which lies to the north of Barceloneta.

=== Coat of arms ===
Barceloneta's coat of arms is similar to the flag, since it features the same Catalan symbols. However, it features three sugarcane flowers (guajanas) on top of the blue fields. The sugarcane flowers symbolize the source of life of the old agricultural economy of Barceloneta. The blue symbolizes the beaches and marine ports that contributed to the industry and commerce of the town. Like many coat of arms, it features a crown with three towers.

=== Nicknames ===
Barceloneta is referred to as "La Ciudad de las Piñas" (Pineapple City) for its many pineapple plantations. It is also known as "La Ciudad Industrial" (Industrial City) for its many industries, mainly pharmaceutical.

Other names are "Ciudad de los Indios" (City of the Indians) and "Pueblo de Sixto Escobar" (Town of Sixto Escobar) for being the birthplace of the Puerto Rican boxer.

== Transportation ==
Barceloneta has recently added the use of trolley cars, free of charge, for local transport within the town itself. For travel outside Barceloneta, there is a station for carros publicos (public car transportation), which is a type of taxi.

There are 9 bridges in Barceloneta.

== Gallery ==
Places in Barceloneta:

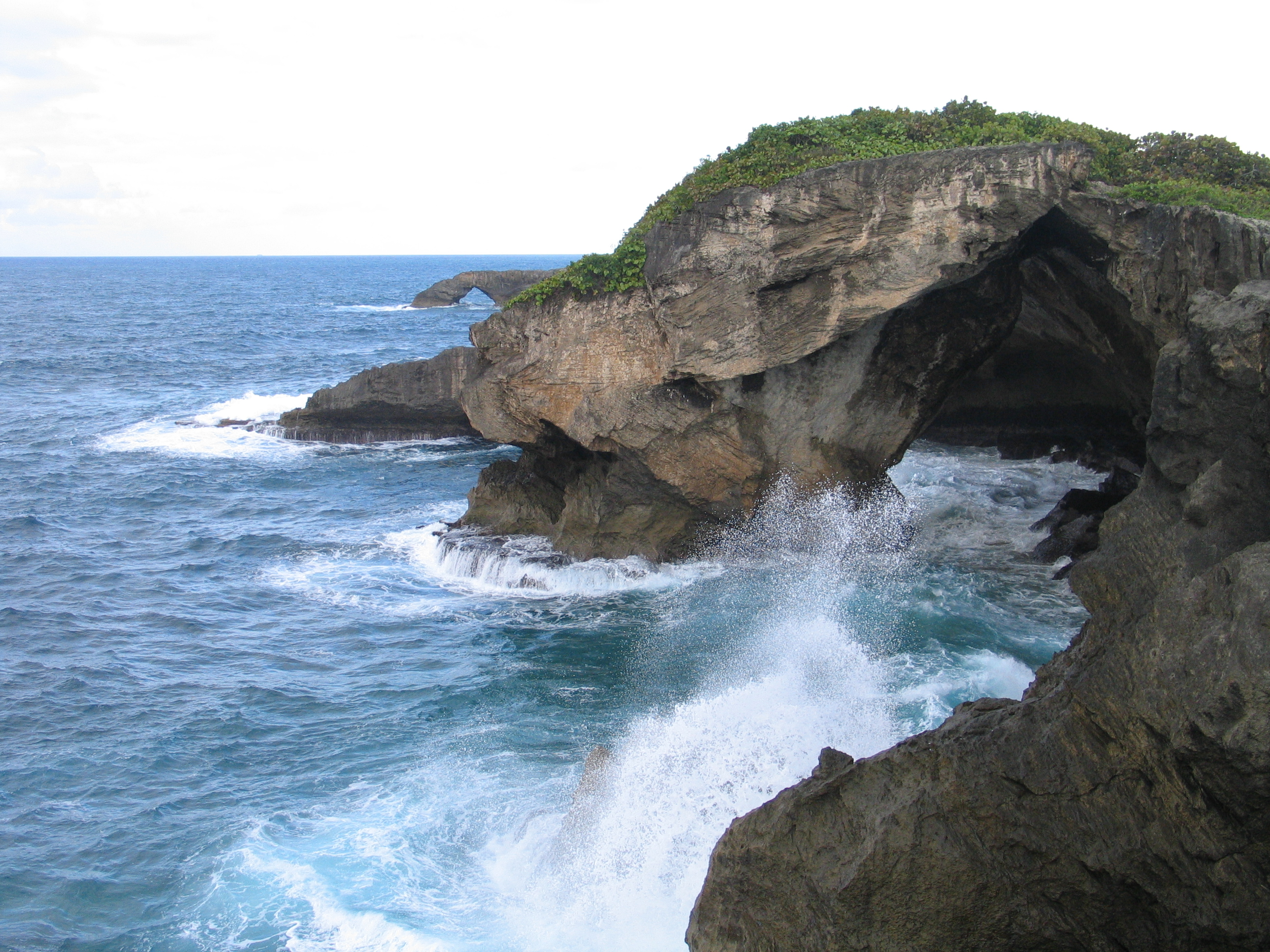
The coast

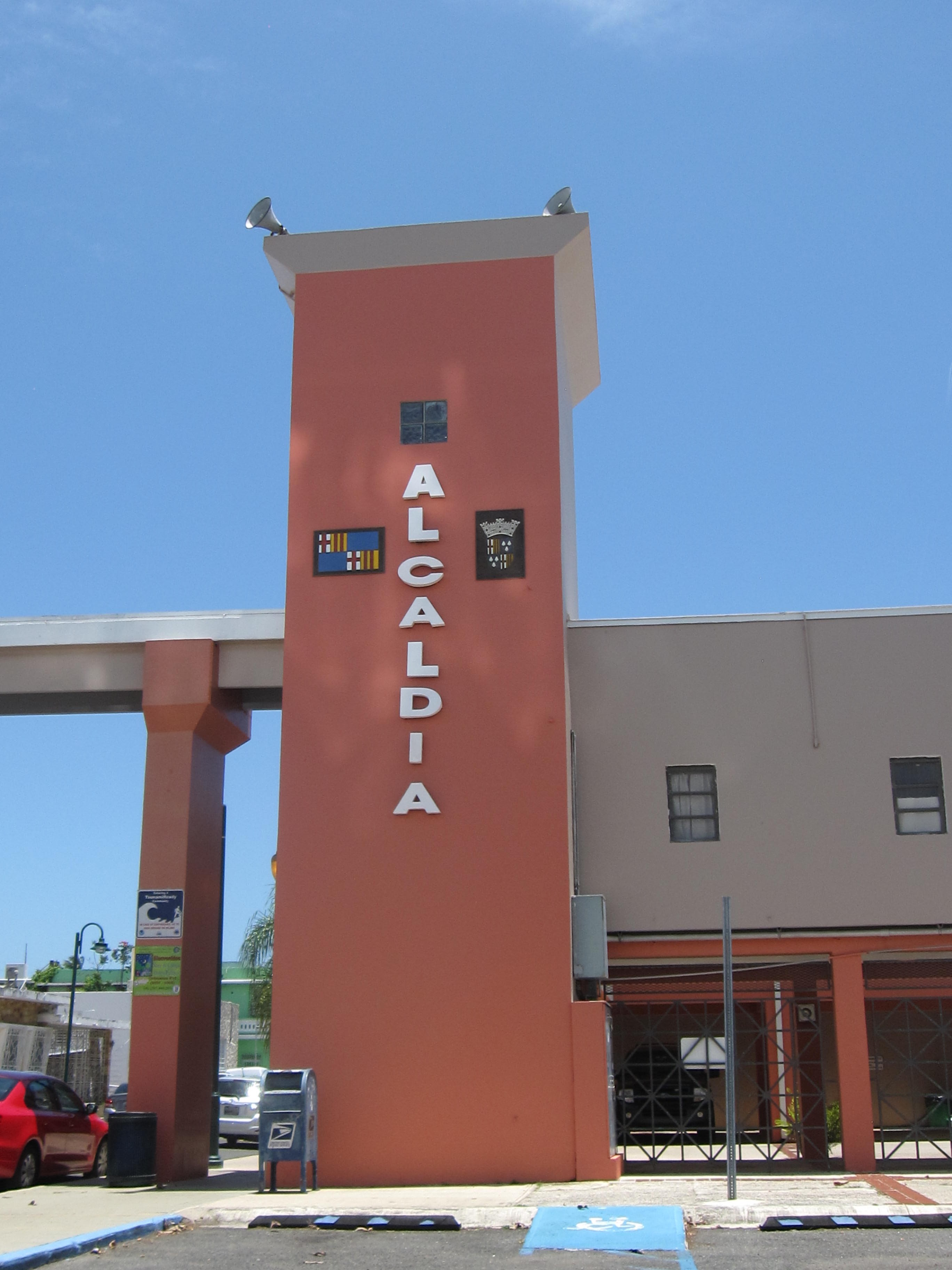
City Hall in Barceloneta barrio-pueblo

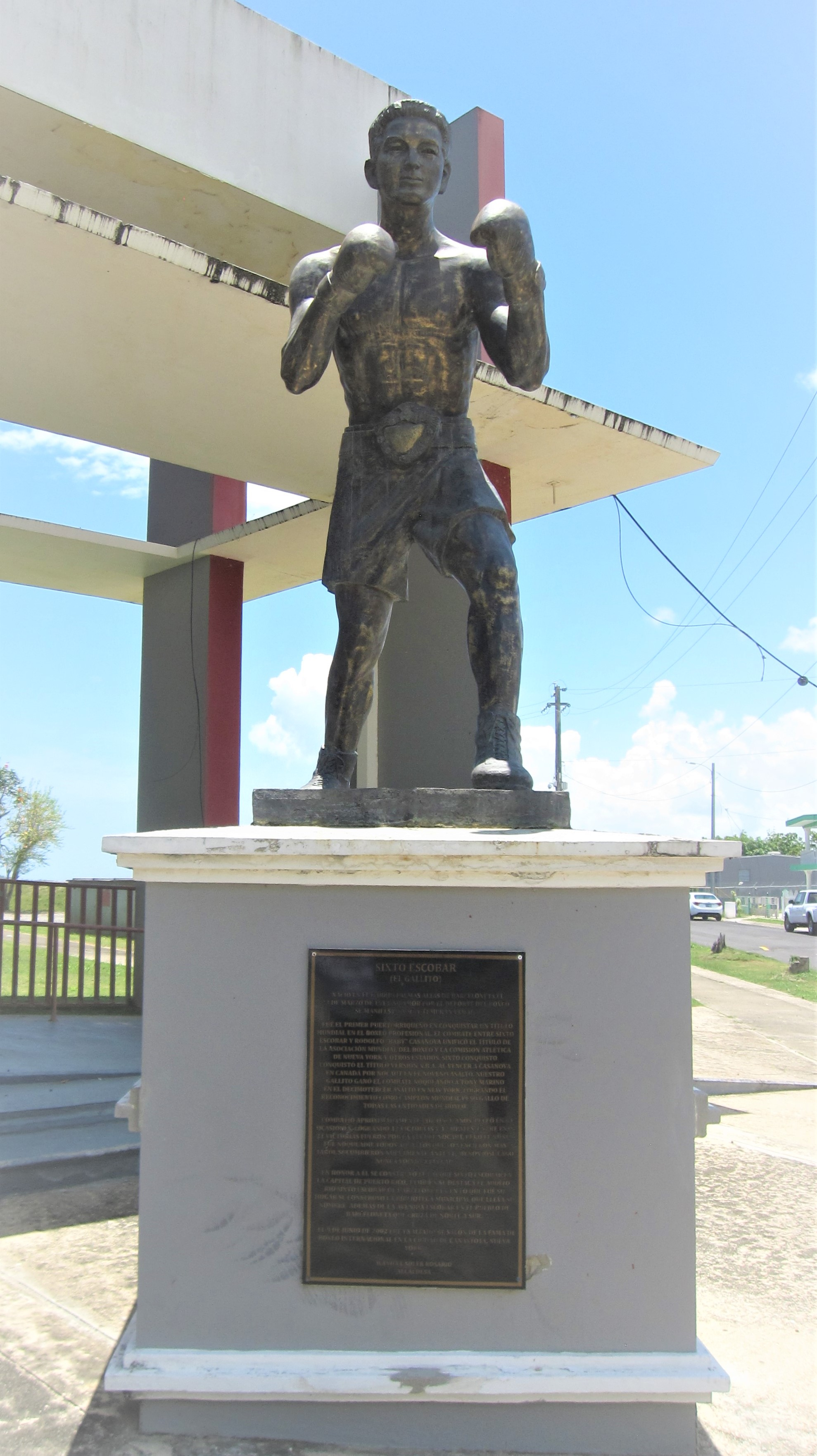
Statue of Sixto Escobar

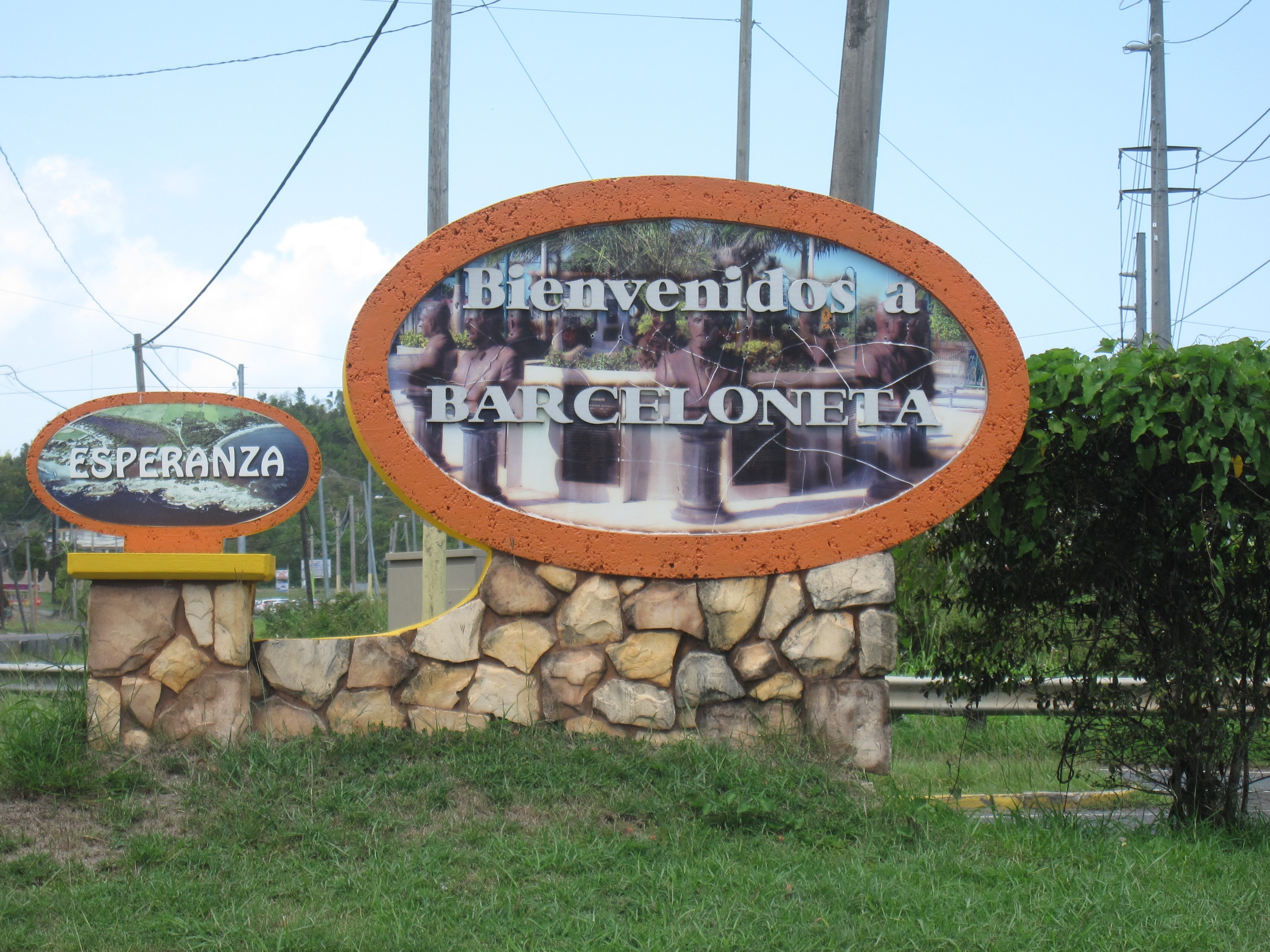
Welcome to Barceloneta sign

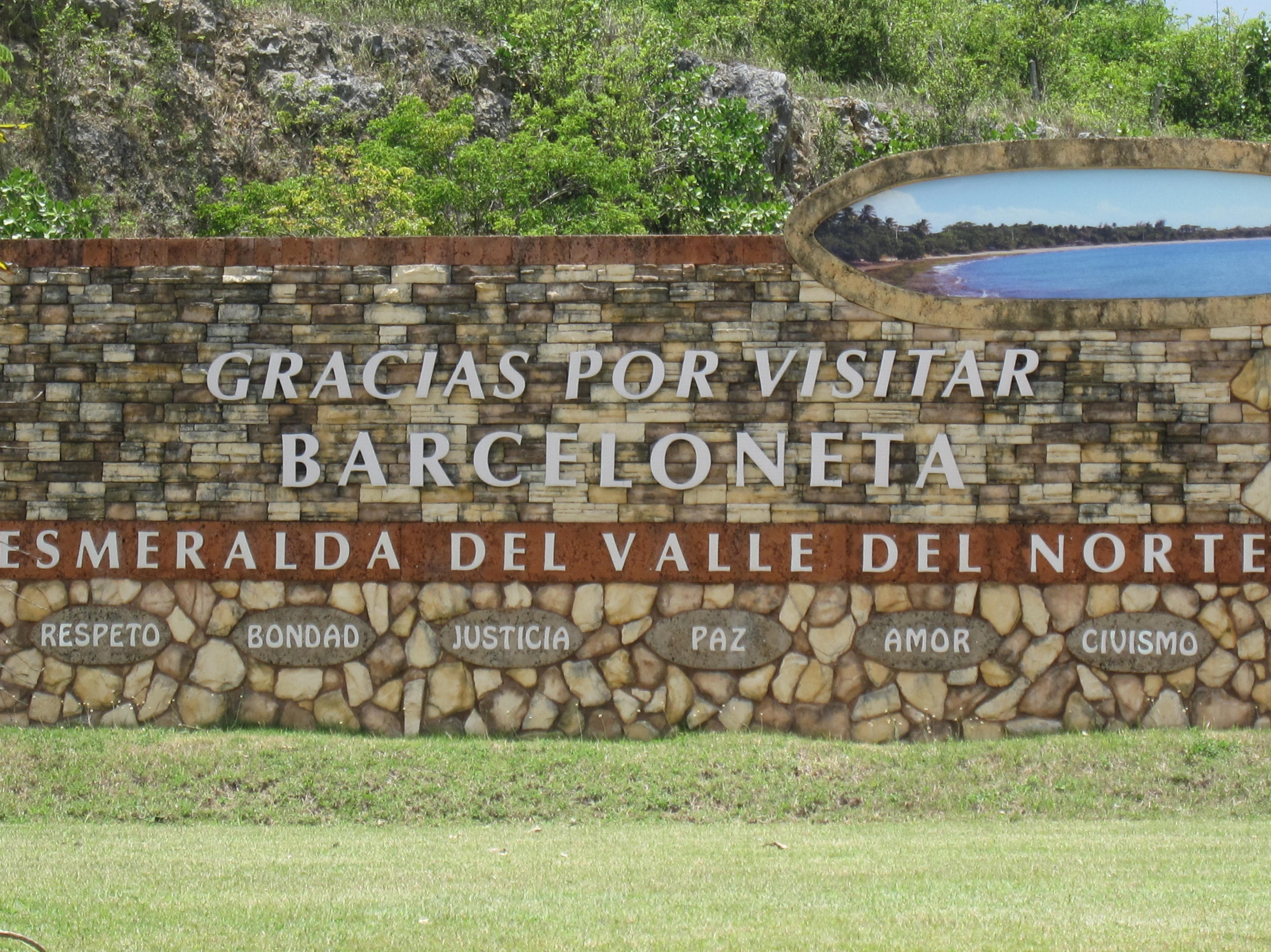
Thank you for visiting message on rock wall

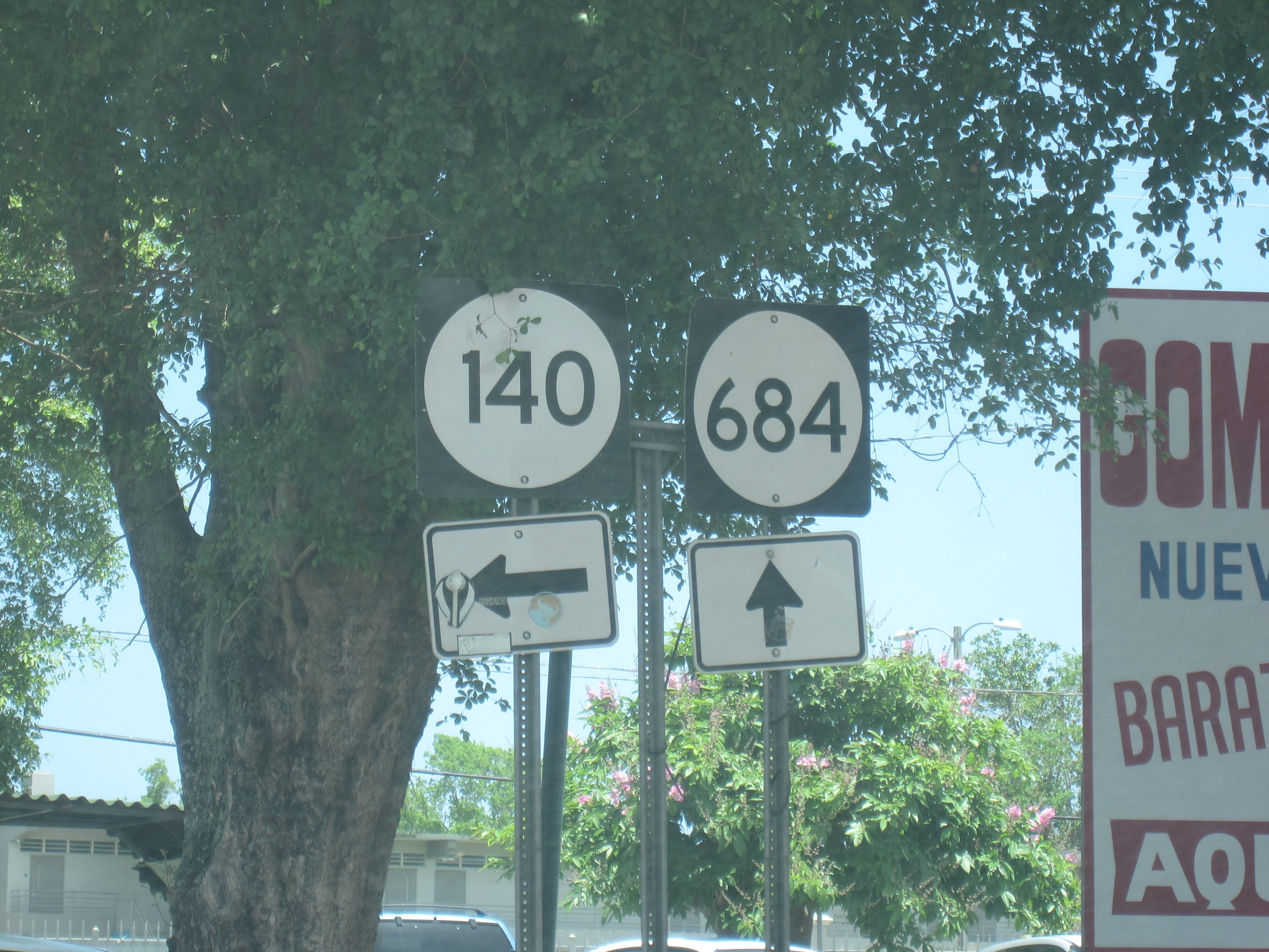
Signs for PR-140 and PR-684

== See also ==
- List of Puerto Ricans
- History of Puerto Rico
