= Barceloneta barrio-pueblo =

Historical and administrative center (seat) of Barceloneta, Puerto Rico

Barceloneta barrio-pueblo Pueblo de Barceloneta
- Municipality Seat
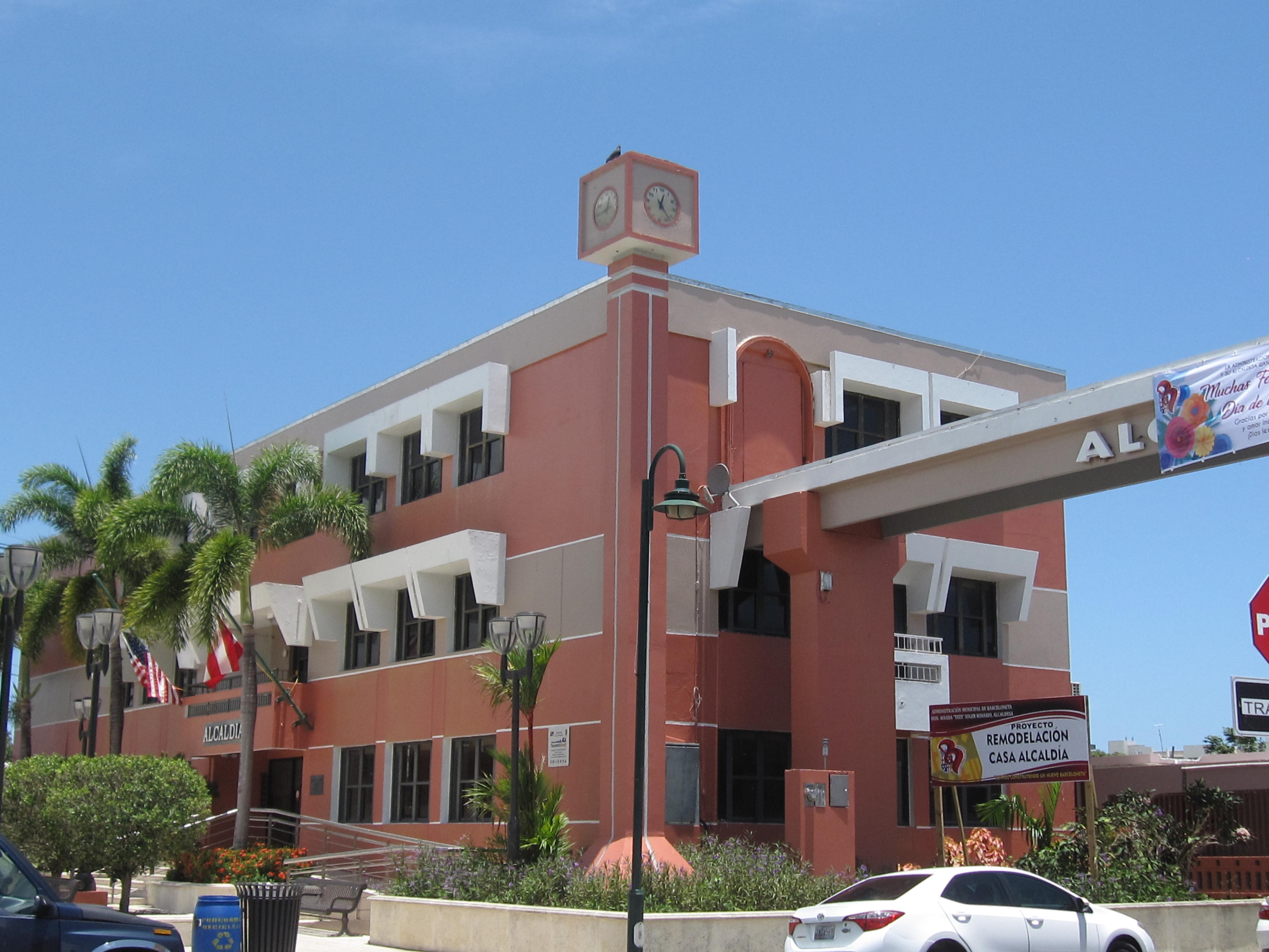
- Town Hall in Barceloneta barrio-pueblo

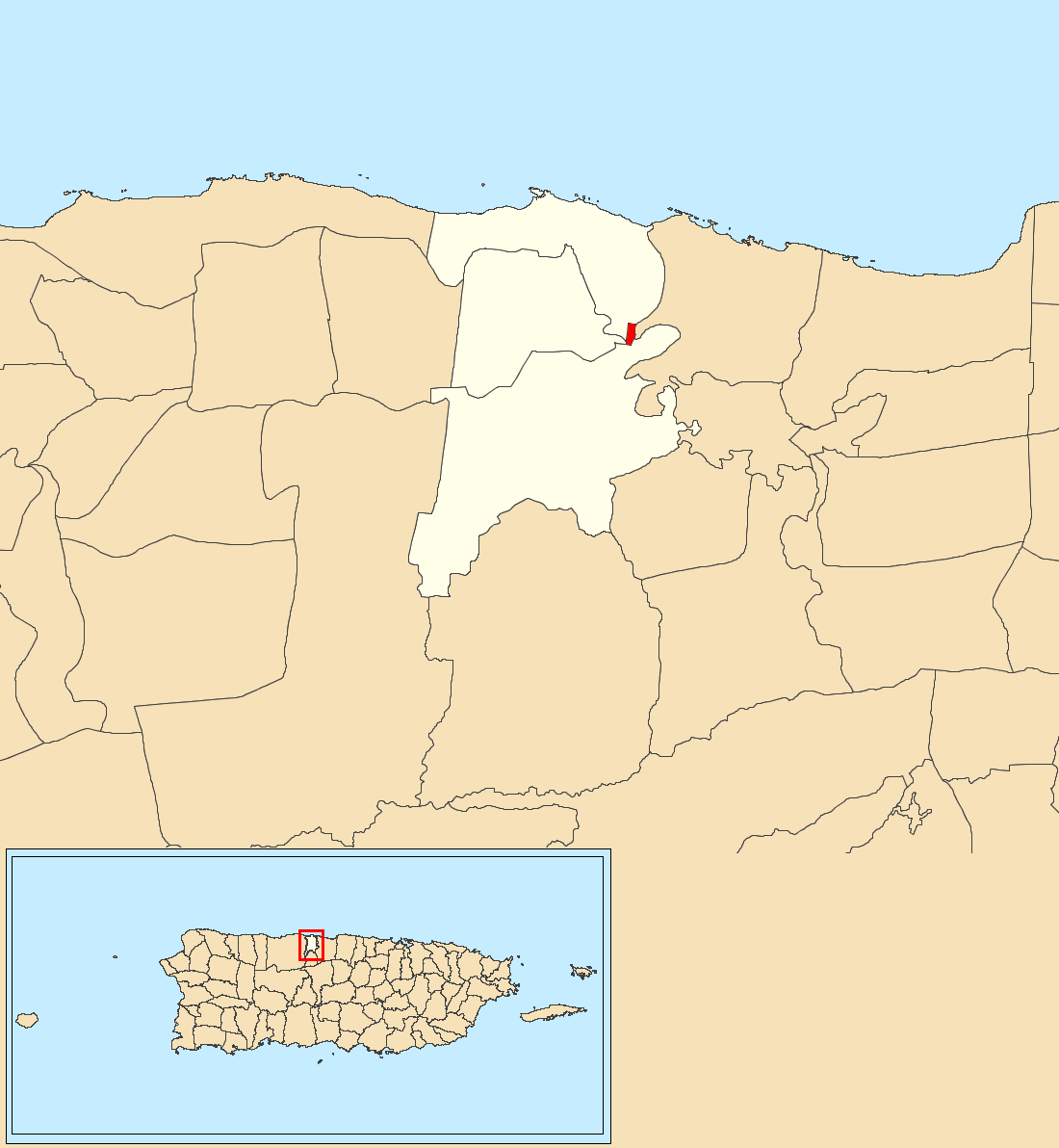
- Location of Barceloneta barrio-pueblo within the municipality of Barceloneta shown in red

- Location of Puerto Rico
- Coordinates: 18°27′17″N 66°32′19″W
- Commonwealth: Puerto Rico
- Municipality: Barceloneta

Area
  - Total: 0.04 sq mi (0.10 km^{2})
  - Land: 0.04 sq mi (0.10 km^{2})
  - Water: 0.00 sq mi (0 km^{2})
- Elevation: 10 ft (3.0 m)

Population (2010)
  - Total: 435
  - Density: 6,400/sq mi (2,500/km^{2})
- Source: 2010 Census
- Time zone: UTC−4 (AST)
- ZIP Code: 00617
- Area code: 787/939

Barceloneta barrio-pueblo is a barrio and the administrative center (seat) of Barceloneta, a municipality of Puerto Rico. Its population in 2010 was 435.

As was customary in Spain, in Puerto Rico, the municipality has a barrio called pueblo which contains a central plaza, the municipal buildings (city hall), and a Catholic church. Fiestas patronales (patron saint festivals) are held in the central plaza every year.

== The central plaza and its church ==
The central plaza, or square, is a place for official and unofficial recreational events and a place where people can gather and socialize from dusk to dawn. The Laws of the Indies, Spanish law, which regulated life in Puerto Rico in the early 19th century, stated the plaza's purpose was for "the parties" (celebrations, festivities) (Spanish: a propósito para las fiestas), and that the square should be proportionally large enough for the number of neighbors (Spanish: grandeza proporcionada al número de vecinos). These Spanish regulations also stated that the streets nearby should be comfortable portals for passersby, protecting them from the elements: sun and rain.

Located across from the central plaza in Barceloneta barrio-pueblo is the Parroquia Nuestra Señora del Carmen (Our Lady of Mount Carmel Parish). The first church was made of masonry but with a wooden roof. Inaugurated around 1881, it was destroyed by Hurricane San Felipe in 1928. The current church was built in 1930 and was most likely designed by Luis Perocier. It has been renovated and enlarged since its inauguration.

== History ==
Barceloneta barrio-pueblo was in Spain's gazetteers until Puerto Rico was ceded by Spain in the aftermath of the Spanish–American War under the terms of the Treaty of Paris of 1898 and became an unincorporated territory of the United States. In 1899, the United States Department of War conducted a census of Puerto Rico finding that the population of Barceloneta barrio was 1,459.

Historical population
Census	Pop.	Note	%±
1900	1,459		—
1910	1,594		9.3%
1920	1,316		−17.4%
1930	1,579		20.0%
1940	1,745		10.5%
1950	1,030		−41.0%
1960	762		−26.0%
1970	0		−100.0%
1980	355		—
1990	285		−19.7%
2000	277		−2.8%
2010	435		57.0%
U.S. Decennial Census; 1899 (shown as 1900) 1910-1930; 1930-1950 1980-2000 2010

== Gallery ==
Places in Barceloneta barrio-pueblo:

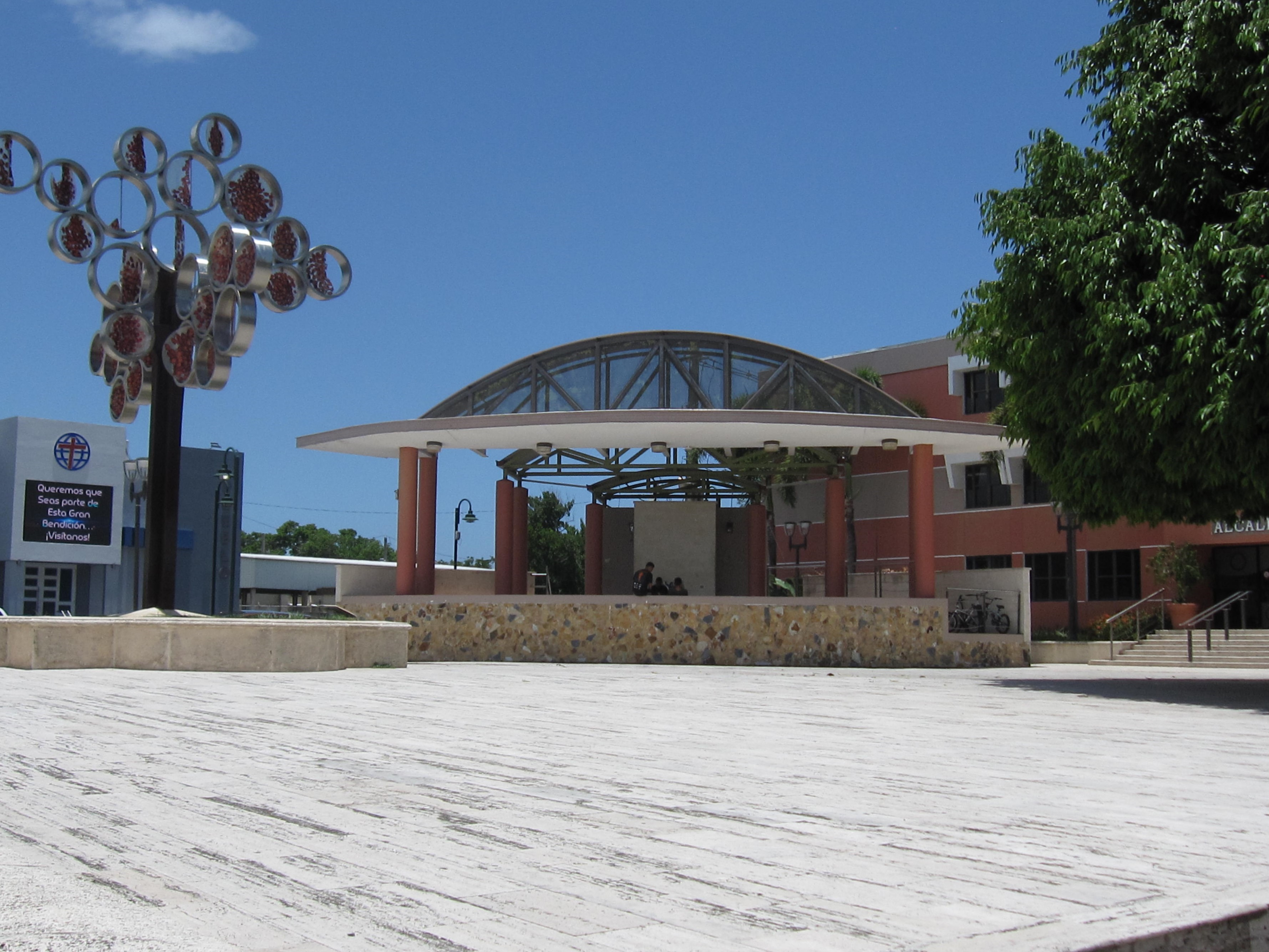
A section of the central plaza

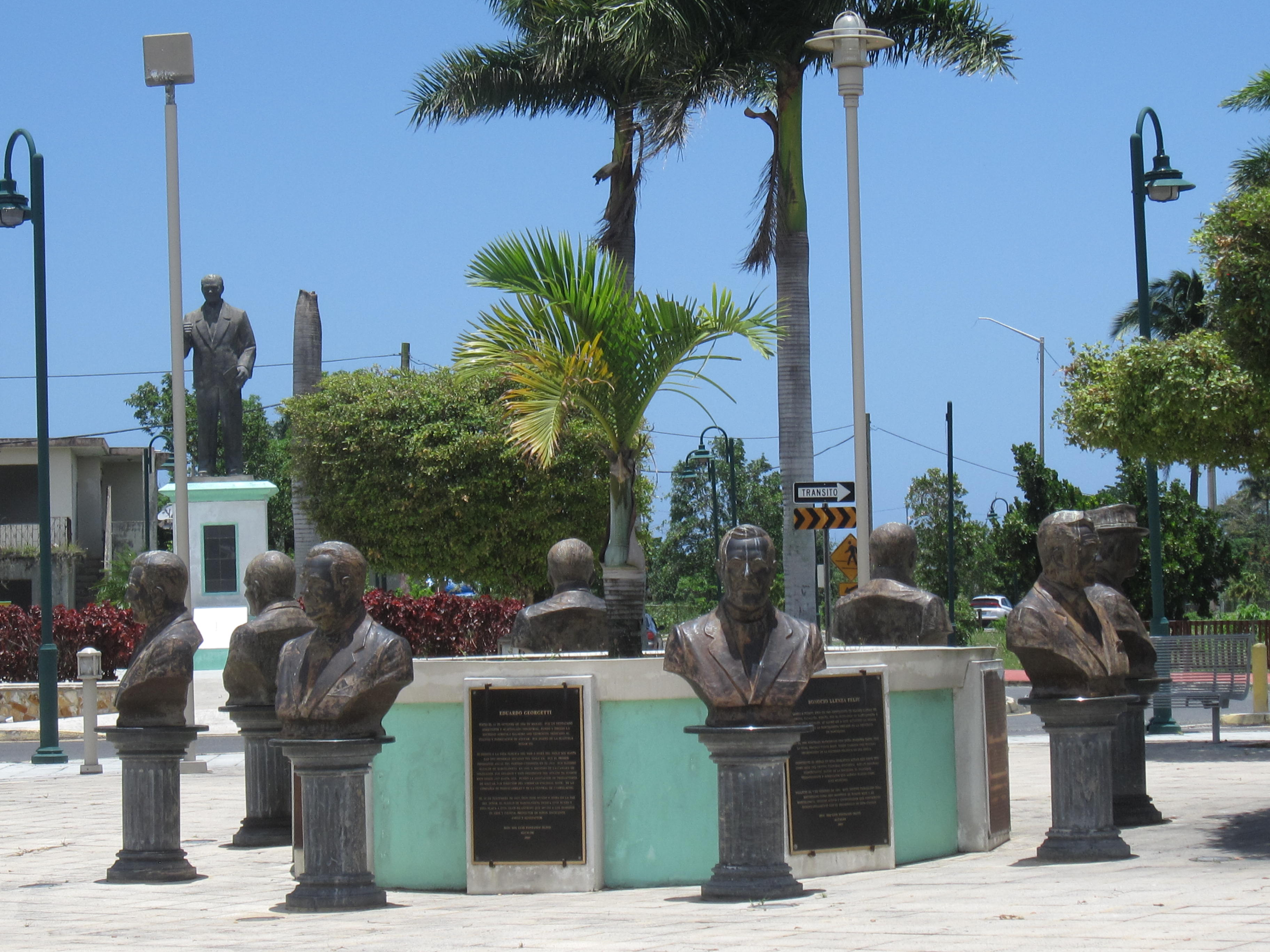
Statues on the Paseo de los Veteranos

== See also ==
- List of communities in Puerto Rico
