= Wanda Soler Rosario =

Puerto Rican politician

Mayor of Barceloneta
- Incumbent
- Assumed office March 10, 2012
- Preceded by: Sol Luis Fontánes

Personal details
- Born: May 18, 1971 (age 55)
- Party: Popular Democratic Party (PPD)
- Education: Universidad del Sagrado Corazón (BA); Bayamón Central University (M.Ed.)

Wanda J. "Tata" Soler Rosario (born May 18, 1971) is a Puerto Rican politician and the current mayor of Barceloneta. Soler is affiliated with the Popular Democratic Party (PPD) and has served as mayor since 2012.

== Early years and studies ==
Wanda Soler received a Bachelor's degree in Industrial Psychology at the Sacred Heart University of Puerto Rico. In 2004, she completed a Master's degree in Education, with a major in Counseling, from Bayamón Central University.

== Public service ==
Soler worked as an Employment Promoter for the Consortium Dorado-Manatí North Central. She was later promoted to Case Handler, and then Deputy Manager. More recently, she has worked as Special Aide for the mayor and finally Director of the Federal Programs Department for the municipality of Barceloneta. She also works as a professor for the American College of Manatí since 2005.

== Political career ==
After the arrest of the mayor of Barceloneta, Sol Luis Fontánes, in February 2012, Soler presented her candidacy to fill the vacant seat. She was elected by a group of 24 delegates on March 10, 2012. Soler was formally reelected by the citizens at the 2012 general election, receiving 69.22% of the votes. This was the second largest margin of victory for any mayor in that election, which led a newspaper to label her as one of the "most powerful" mayors in the island. In 2016, she was reelected for a second term. In 2020 she was reelected for her third term with 75% of the vote.
