= Héctor Ruiz Martínez =

Mayor of Barceloneta, Puerto Rico

Héctor Ruíz Martínez

Mayor of Barceloneta
- In office January 2, 1985 – May 6, 1986
- Preceded by: Elí Ramos Rosario
- Succeeded by: Sol Luis Fontánes

Personal details
- Born: November 14, 1943 Barceloneta, Puerto Rico
- Died: May 6, 1986 (aged 42)
- Party: Popular Democratic Party (PPD)
- Spouse: Juana Ramos
- Education: University of Puerto Rico
- Occupation: Politician, Teacher

Military service
- Allegiance: United States of America
- Branch/service: United States Army
- Battles/wars: Vietnam War

Héctor Ruíz Martínez (November 14, 1943 – May 6, 1986) was a Puerto Rican politician and teacher. He was mayor of Barceloneta from 1985 until his death in 1986.

== Early years and studies ==
Héctor Ruíz Martínez was born on November 14, 1943, in the Tosas Sector of Barrio Magueyes in Barceloneta, Puerto Rico. He was the seventh son of Gustavo Vidal Ruíz and Filadelfia Martínez. When his mother died a month later, Héctor was taken to his grandparents who raised him. Ruíz studied his elementary school in Pajonal, but after graduating, his father enrolled him at the Rafael Balseiro Maceira Junior High School in Barceloneta. He graduated in 1962, and was the President of his class.

Ruíz enters the University of Puerto Rico, specifically the Pedagogy Department. However, before he could finish his bachelor's degree, he is called up by the United States Army to serve in the Vietnam War. After completing his years of military service, he returns to Puerto Rico and completes his degree, specializing in Spanish.

== Professional career ==
Ruíz began working as a teacher in the Barrio Boquillas of Manatí, but he later transfers to the Urban Elementary School where he works for several years. He then works at a junior high school, where he serves as teacher of Industrial Arts and Special Education. He also served as Coordinator for the Spanish Program to the Superintendent's Office in Barceloneta. Ruíz later became part of the faculty of the Fernando Suria Cháves High School. He also directed Troop 224 of the local Cub Scouts.

== Political career ==
Ruíz began his political career when he was appointed President of the Popular Youth in Barceloneta. He decided to run for mayor and won the primaries of his party. Ruíz went on to win at the 1984 general elections, defeating the incumbent mayor, Elí Ramos Rosario.

== Death and legacy ==
During his short tenure as mayor, Ruíz had to deal with the bankruptcy of Barceloneta, as well as the devastation caused by Tropical Storm Isabel in 1985. His health deteriorated and Ruíz died on May 6, 1986. He was succeeded by Sol Luis Fontánes.

A housing project and a school in Barceloneta currently bear the name of Héctor Ruíz Martínez.

== Personal life ==
Ruíz was married to Juana Ramos.
