= Garrochales, Barceloneta, Puerto Rico =

Barrio of Puerto Rico

Garrochales
- Barrio
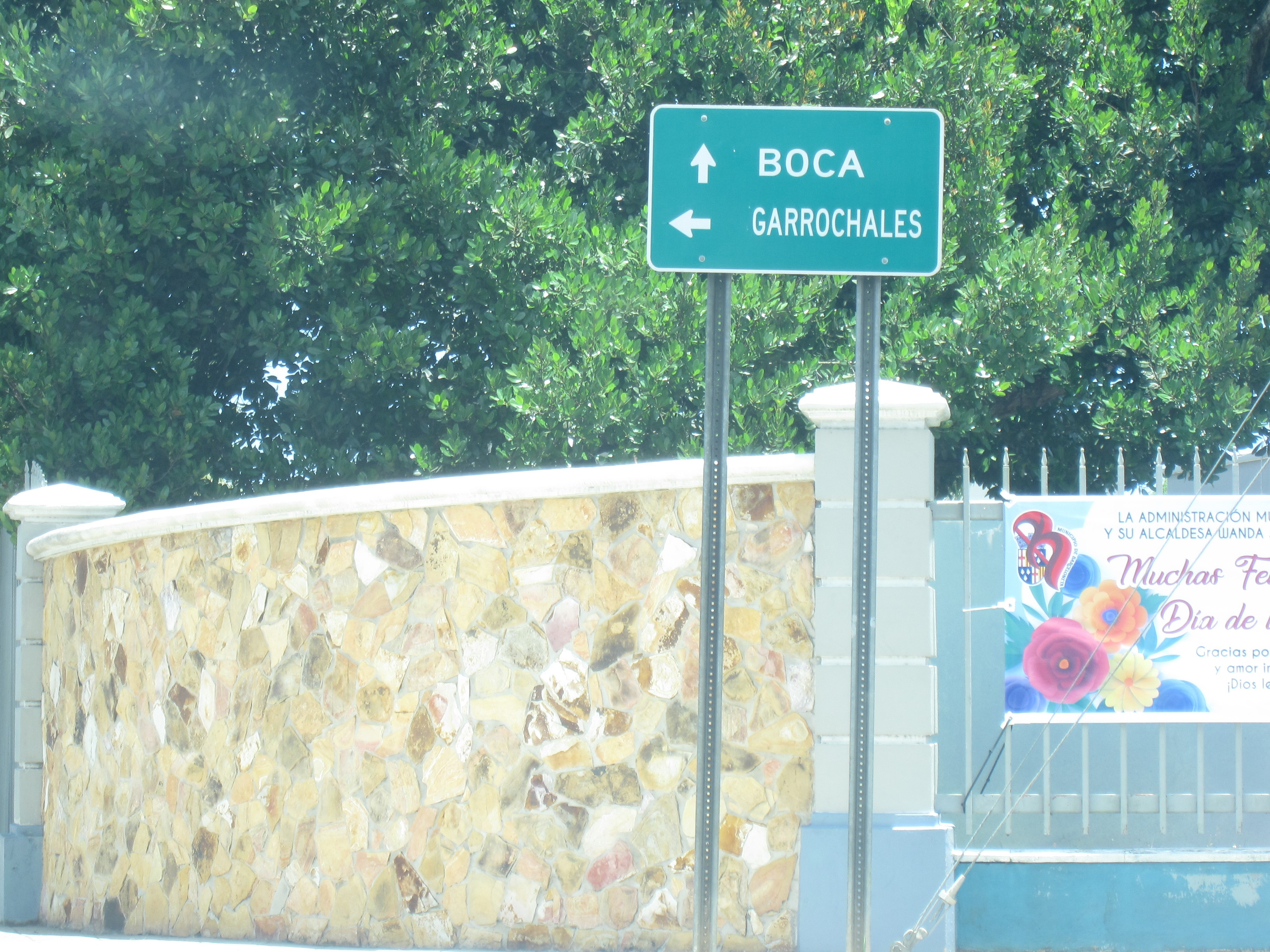
- Sign for Boca and Garrochales on PR-2

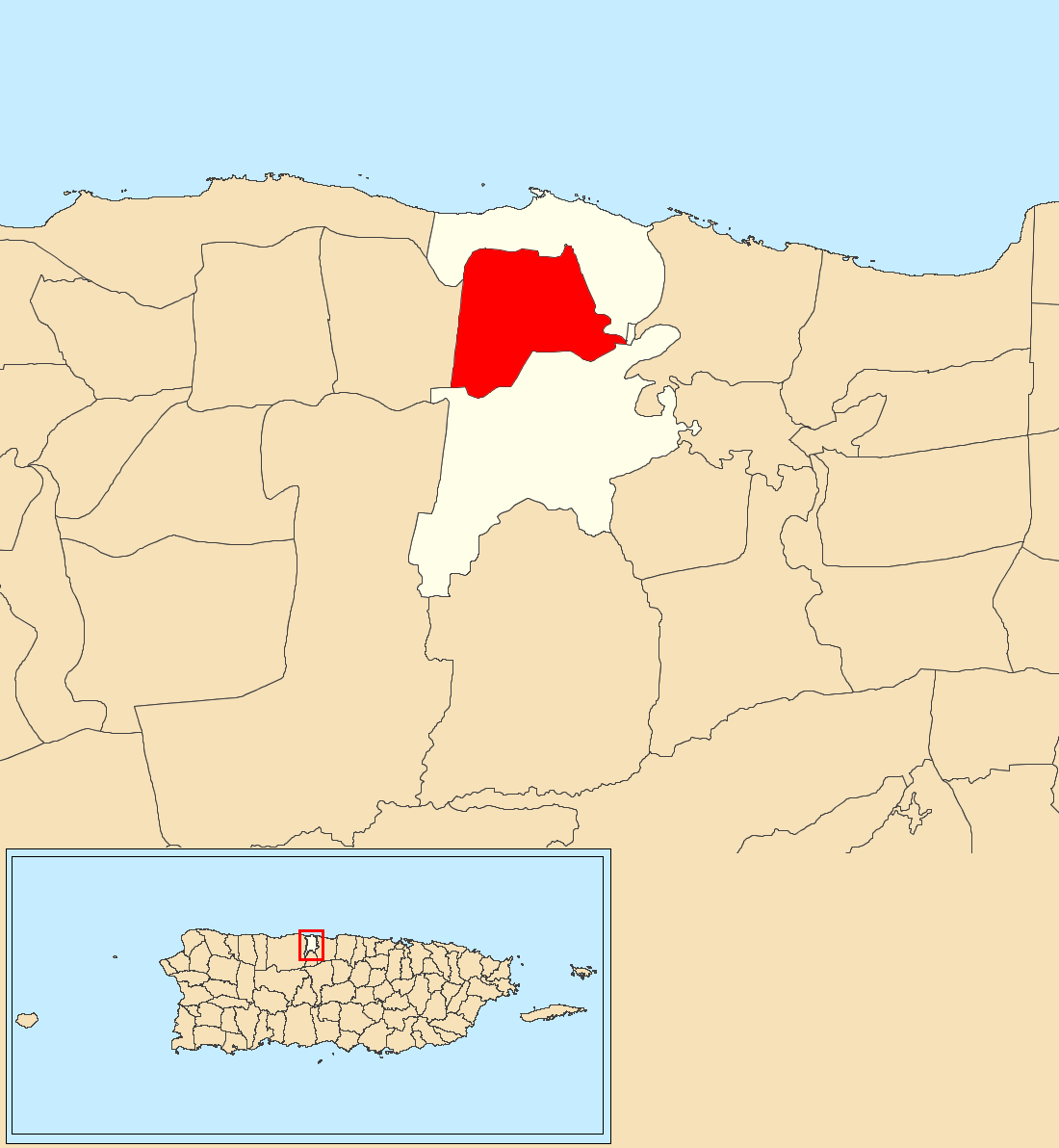
- Location of Garrochales within the municipality of Barceloneta shown in red

- Location of Puerto Rico
- Coordinates: 18°27′33″N 66°34′09″W
- Commonwealth: Puerto Rico
- Municipality: Barceloneta

Area
  - Total: 4.49 sq mi (11.6 km^{2})
  - Land: 4.47 sq mi (11.6 km^{2})
  - Water: 0.02 sq mi (0.052 km^{2})
- Elevation: 16 ft (4.9 m)

Population (2010)
  - Total: 4,542
  - Density: 423.7/sq mi (163.6/km^{2})
- Source: 2010 Census
- Time zone: UTC−4 (AST)
- ZIP Code: 00617
- Area code: 787/939

Garrochales is a barrio in the municipality of Barceloneta, Puerto Rico. Its population in 2010 was 4,542.

== History ==
Garrochales was in Spain's gazetteers until Puerto Rico was ceded by Spain in the aftermath of the Spanish–American War under the terms of the Treaty of Paris of 1898 and became an unincorporated territory of the United States. In 1899, the United States Department of War conducted a census of Puerto Rico finding that the population of Garrochales barrio was 1,058.

Historical population
Census	Pop.	Note	%±
1900	1,058		—
1910	1,772		67.5%
1920	1,710		−3.5%
1930	2,531		48.0%
1940	3,149		24.4%
1950	2,451		−22.2%
1960	1,418		−42.1%
1970	0		−100.0%
1980	3,349		—
1990	2,947		−12.0%
2000	5,201		76.5%
2010	4,542		−12.7%
U.S. Decennial Census; 1899 (shown as 1900) 1910-1930; 1930-1950 1980-2000 2010

== See also ==
- List of communities in Puerto Rico
