= Bajo, Patillas, Puerto Rico =

Barrio of Puerto Rico

Bajo Bajos
- Barrio
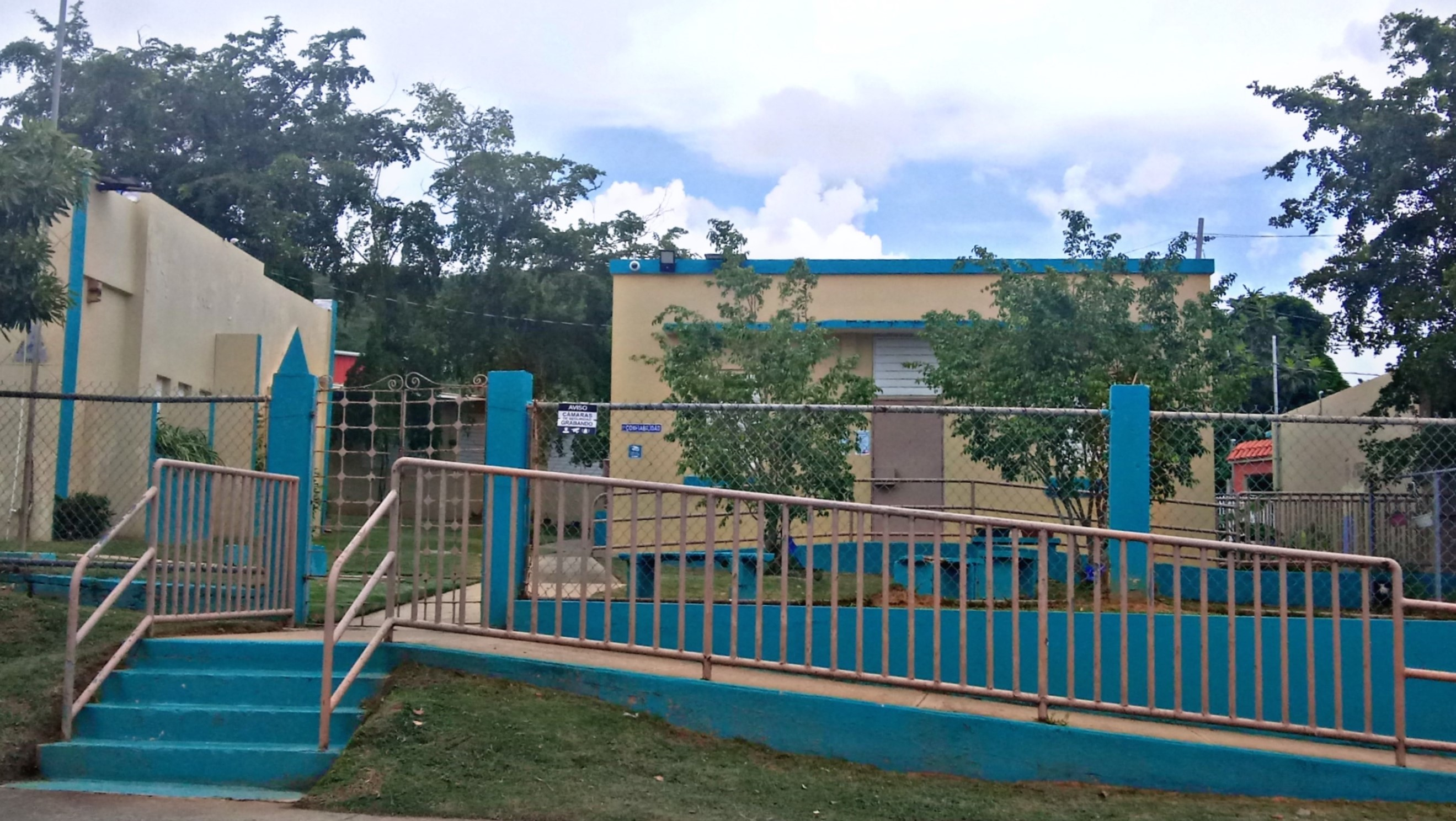
- Elementary school in Bajos

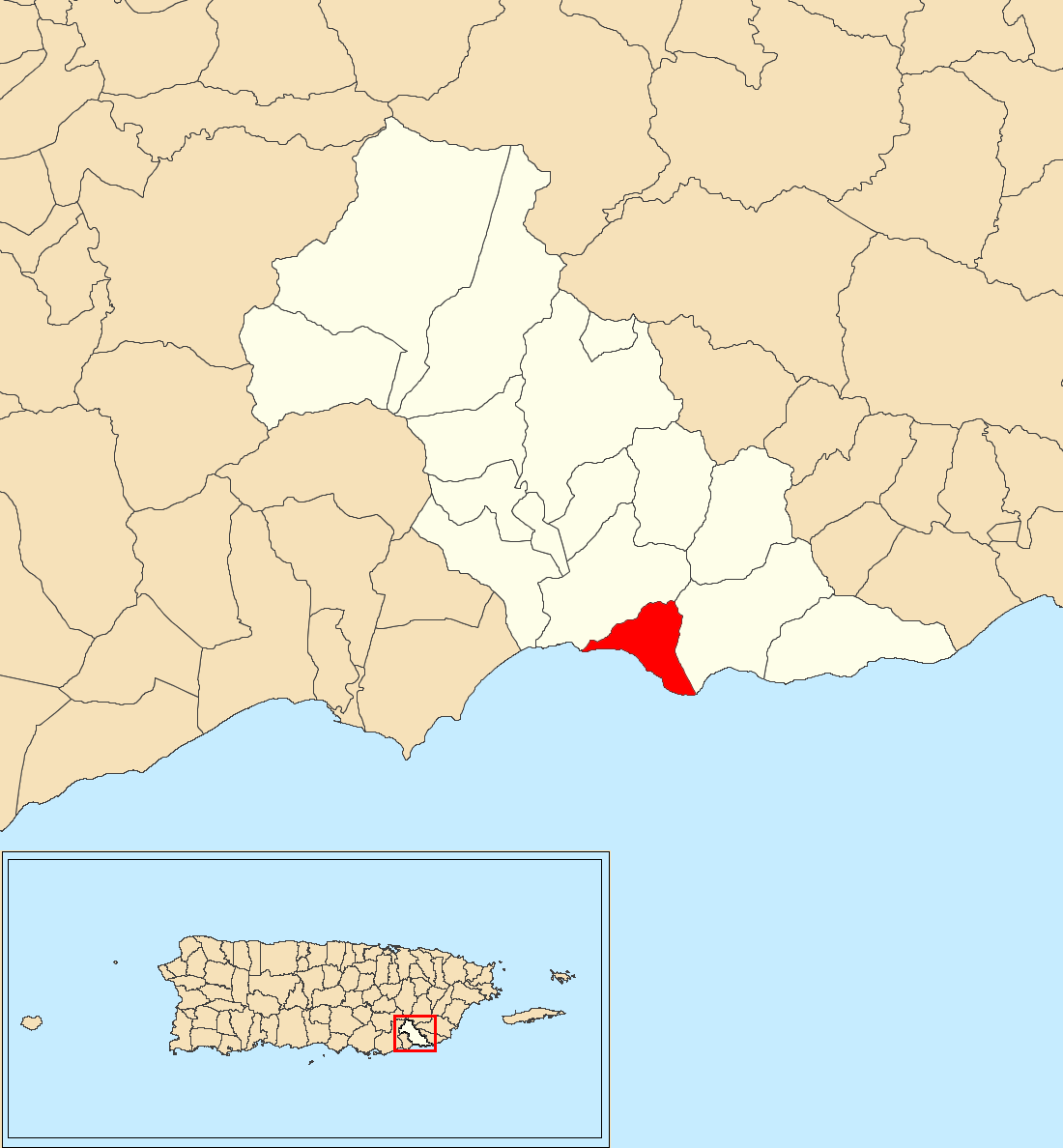
- Location of Bajo within the municipality of Patillas shown in red

- Location of Puerto Rico
- Coordinates: 17°58′30″N 65°59′21″W
- Commonwealth: Puerto Rico
- Municipality: Patillas

Area
  - Total: 2.66 sq mi (6.9 km^{2})
  - Land: 1.21 sq mi (3.1 km^{2})
  - Water: 1.45 sq mi (3.8 km^{2})
- Elevation: 0 ft (0 m)

Population (2010)
  - Total: 1,530
  - Density: 1,264.5/sq mi (488.2/km^{2})
- Source: 2010 Census
- Time zone: UTC−4 (AST)
- ZIP Code: 00723
- Area code: 787/939

Bajo (Barrio Bajo) also spelled Bajos is a barrio in the municipality of Patillas, Puerto Rico. Its population in 2010 was 1,530.

== History ==
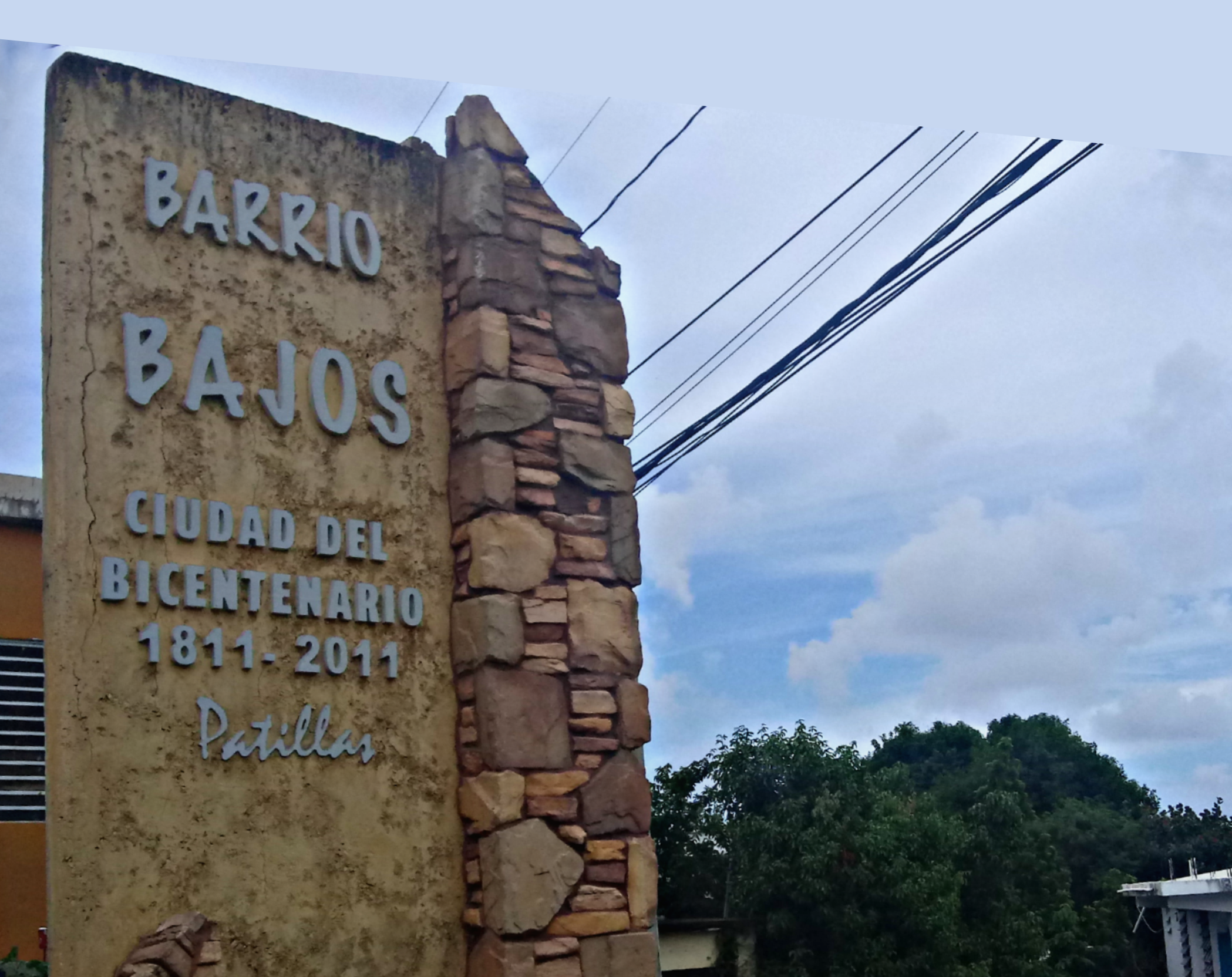
Rock wall sign in Bajos, Patillas, Puerto Rico

Bajo was in Spain's gazetteers until Puerto Rico was ceded by Spain in the aftermath of the Spanish–American War under the terms of the Treaty of Paris of 1898 and became an unincorporated territory of the United States. In 1899, the United States Department of War conducted a census of Puerto Rico finding that the combined population of Bajo and Jacaboa barrios was 1,198.

Historical population
Census	Pop.	Note	%±
1910	691		—
1920	741		7.2%
1930	800		8.0%
1940	835		4.4%
1950	1,328		59.0%
1960	1,489		12.1%
1970	1,544		3.7%
1980	1,686		9.2%
1990	1,716		1.8%
2000	1,722		0.3%
2010	1,530		−11.1%
U.S. Decennial Census; 1900 (N/A) 1910-1930; 1930-1950 1980-2000 2010

== Sectors ==
Barrios (which are, in contemporary times, roughly comparable to minor civil divisions) in turn are further subdivided into smaller local populated place areas/units called sectores (sectors in English). The types of sectores may vary, from normally sector to urbanización to reparto to barriada to residencial, among others.

The following sectors are in Bajo barrio:

Calle El Fuego, Carretera 3, Sector Barro Blanco, Sector Villa Marina, Sector Villa Pesquera, and Urbanización Solimar.

== See also ==
- List of communities in Puerto Rico
- List of barrios and sectors of Patillas, Puerto Rico
