= Jacaboa =

Barrio of Patillas, Puerto Rico

- Barrio
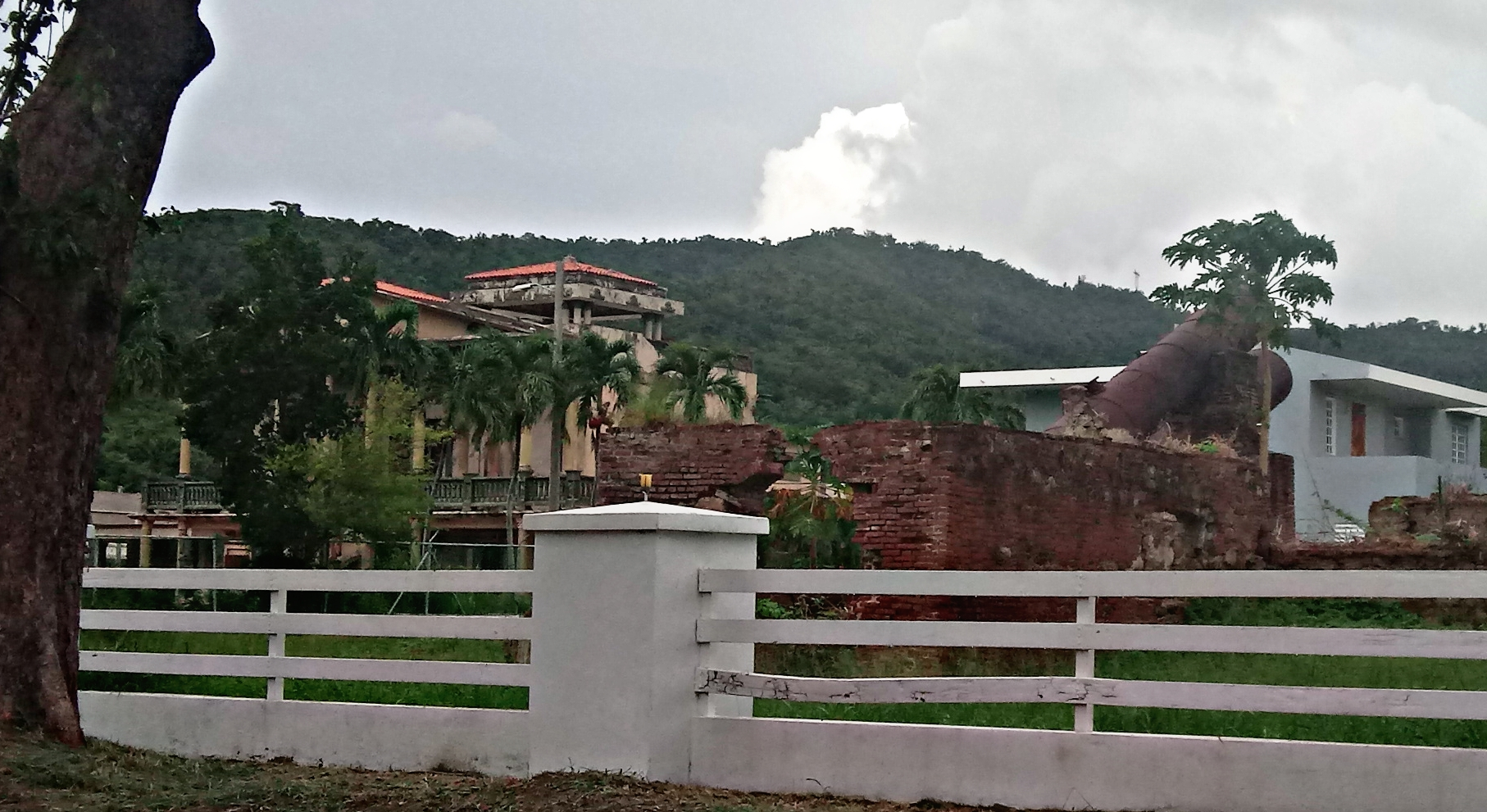
- New and old structures in Jacaboa

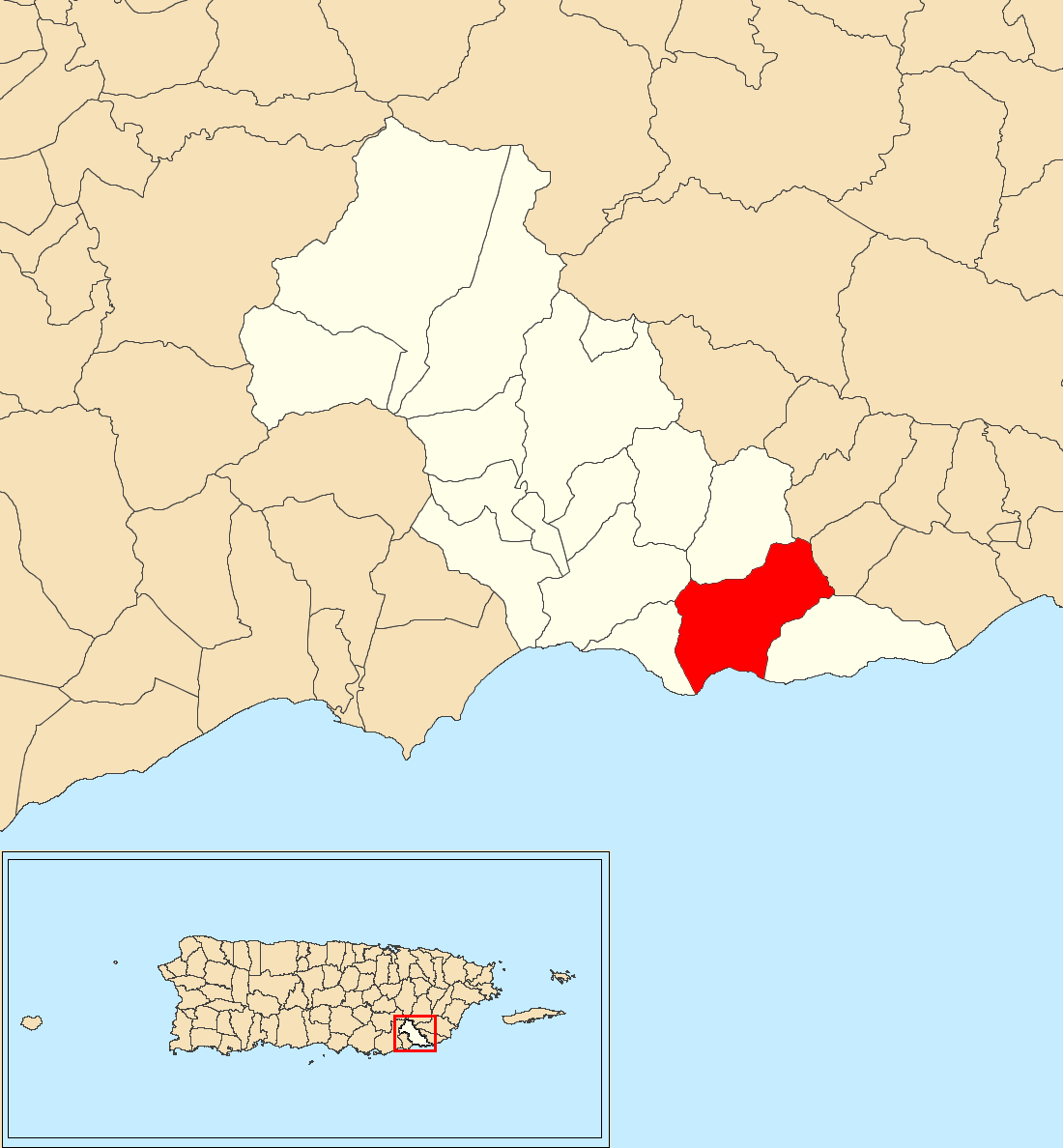
- Location of Jacaboa within the municipality of Patillas shown in red

- Location of Puerto Rico
- Coordinates: 17°58′55″N 65°57′50″W
- Commonwealth: Puerto Rico
- Municipality: Patillas

Area
  - Total: 4.47 sq mi (11.6 km^{2})
  - Land: 3.49 sq mi (9.0 km^{2})
  - Water: 0.98 sq mi (2.5 km^{2})
- Elevation: 108 ft (33 m)

Population (2010)
  - Total: 1,278
  - Density: 366.2/sq mi (141.4/km^{2})
- Source: 2010 Census
- Time zone: UTC−4 (AST)
- ZIP Code: 00723
- Area code: 787/939

Jacaboa is a barrio in the municipality of Patillas, Puerto Rico. Its population in 2010 was 1,278.

== History ==
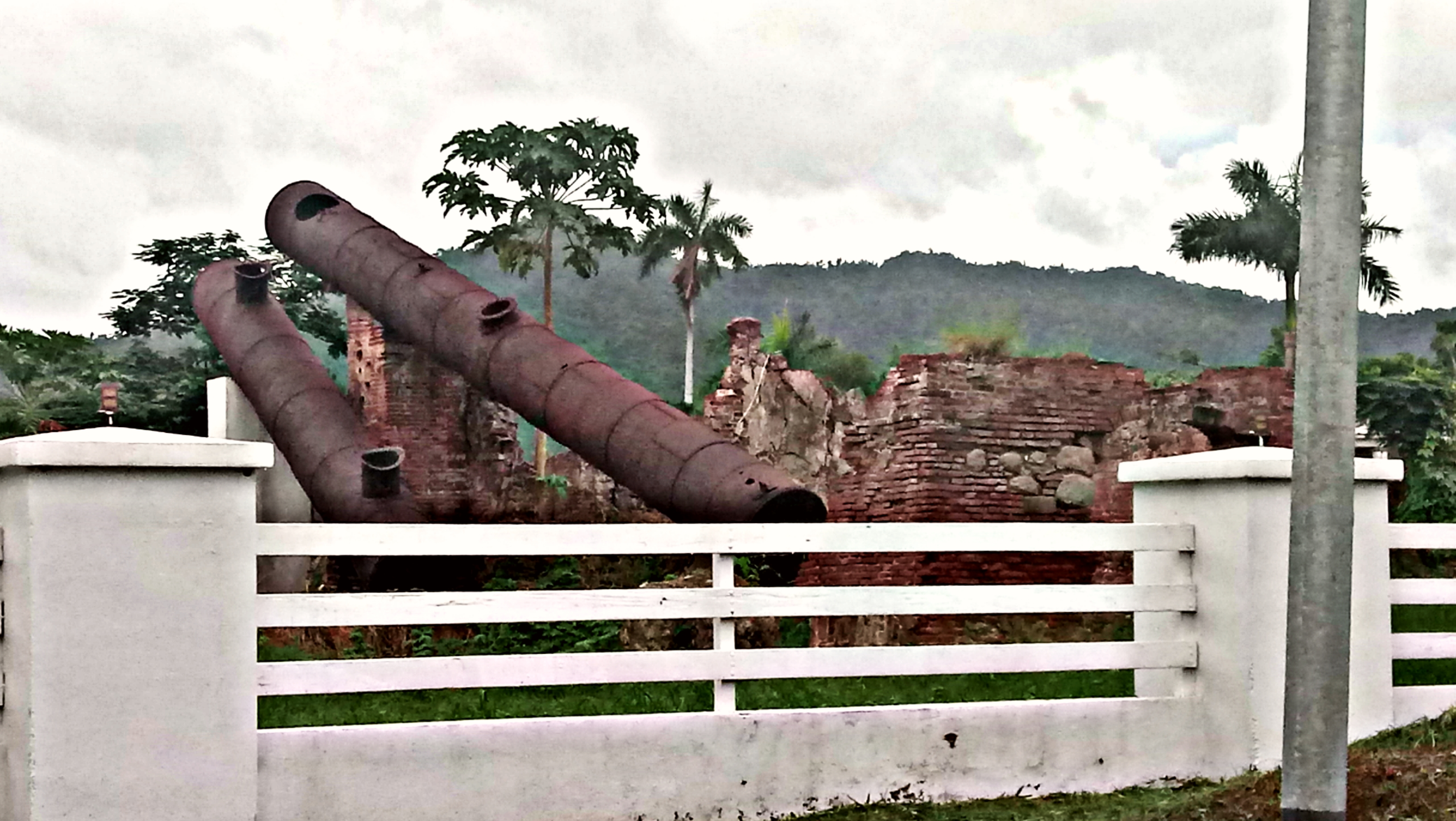
Sectioned off ruins in Jacaboa

Jacaboa was in Spain's gazetteers until Puerto Rico was ceded by Spain in the aftermath of the Spanish–American War under the terms of the Treaty of Paris of 1898 and became an unincorporated territory of the United States. In 1899, the United States Department of War conducted a census of Puerto Rico finding that the combined population of Bajo and Jacaboa barrios was 1,198.

Historical population
| Census | Pop. | Note | %± |
|---|---|---|---|
| 1910 | 1,098 | | — |
| 1920 | 1,033 | | −5.9% |
| 1930 | 1,065 | | 3.1% |
| 1940 | 1,236 | | 16.1% |
| 1950 | 1,342 | | 8.6% |
| 1960 | 1,220 | | −9.1% |
| 1970 | 1,454 | | 19.2% |
| 1980 | 1,078 | | −25.9% |
| 1990 | 937 | | −13.1% |
| 2000 | 1,143 | | 22.0% |
| 2010 | 1,278 | | 11.8% |
U.S. Decennial Census; 1900 (N/A) 1910-1930; 1930-1950 1980-2000 2010

== Sectors ==
Barrios (which are, in contemporary times, roughly comparable to minor civil divisions) in turn are further subdivided into smaller local populated place areas/units called sectores (sectors in English). The types of sectores may vary, from normally sector to urbanización to reparto to barriada to residencial, among others.

The following sectors are in Jacaboa barrio:

Calle El Fuego, Carretera 3, Carretera 758, Sector Barro Blanco, Sector Higuero (Carretera 7755), Sector Lamboglia, Sector Malagueta, Sector Mercado, Sector Merle, Sector Palenque, Sector Villa Marina, Sector Villa Pesquera, Sector Los Solices, Solares Dr. Dávila, Urbanización Portales de Jacaboa.

== See also ==
- List of communities in Puerto Rico
- List of barrios and sectors of Patillas, Puerto Rico
