= Caonillas (disambiguation) =

Caonillas may refer to:

== Places ==
- Caonillas, Aibonito, Puerto Rico, a barrio
- Caonillas Abajo, Utuado, Puerto Rico, a barrio
- Caonillas Abajo, Villalba, Puerto Rico, a barrio
- Caonillas Arriba, Utuado, Puerto Rico, a barrio
- Caonillas Arriba, Villalba, Puerto Rico, a barrio
