= Caonillas Abajo, Utuado, Puerto Rico =

Barrio of Puerto Rico

Caonillas Abajo
- Barrio
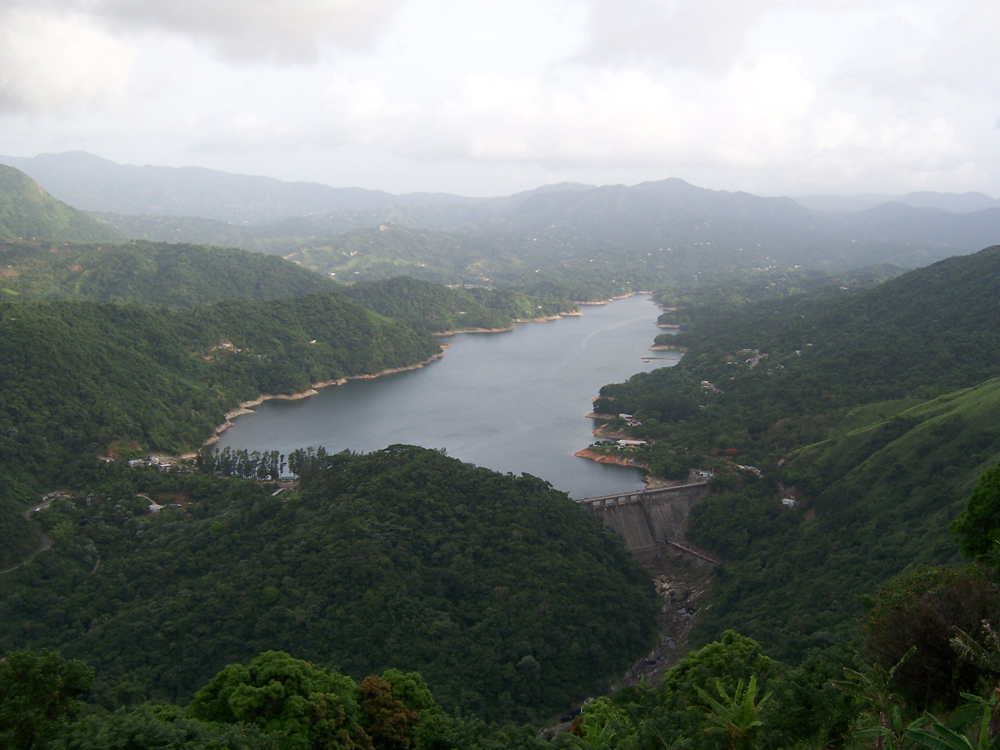
- Lago Caonillas within Barrios Caonillas Abajo, Caonillas Arriba, and Las Palmas

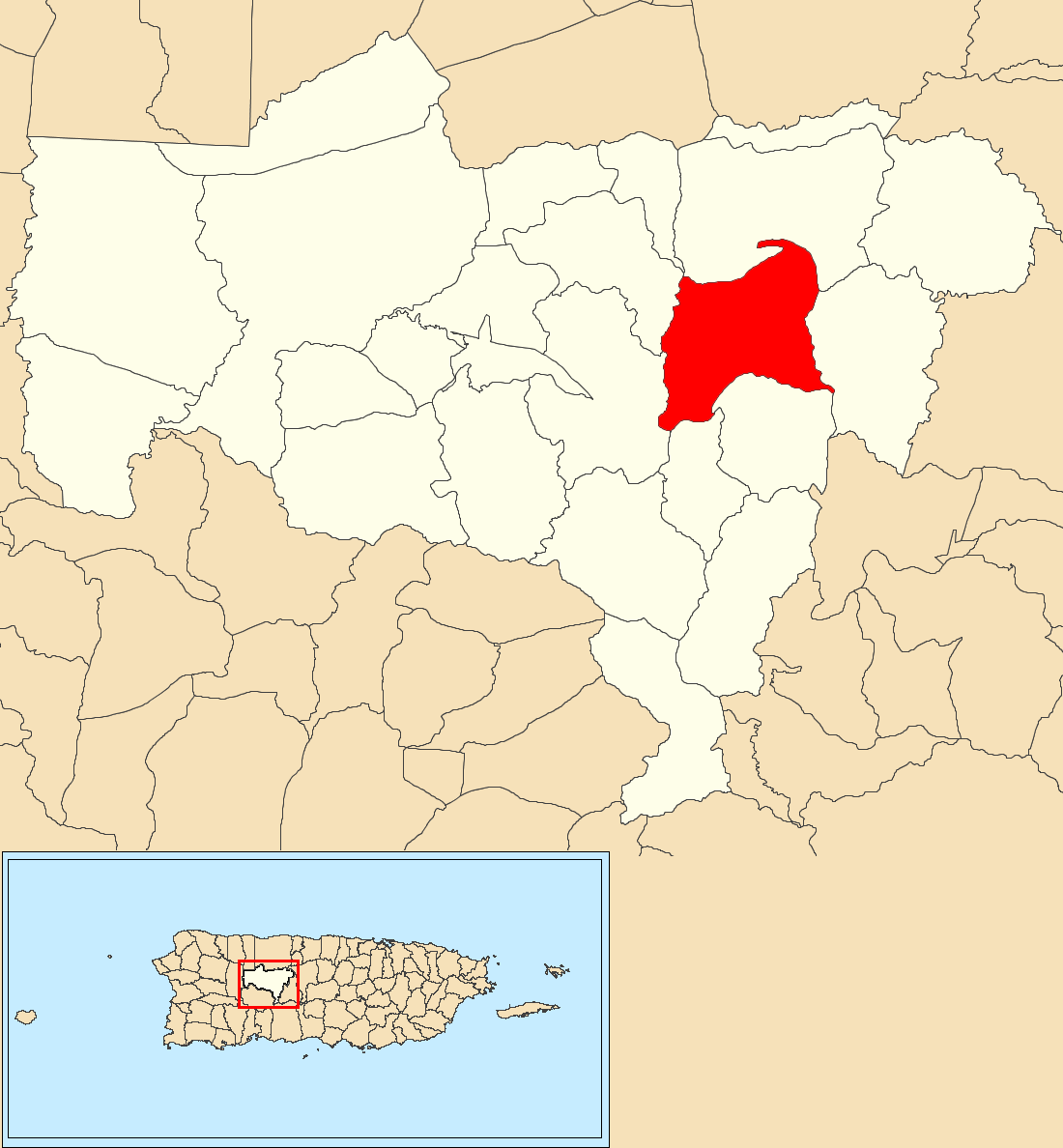
- Location of Caonillas Abajo within the municipality of Utuado shown in red

- Location of Puerto Rico
- Coordinates: 18°16′41″N 66°38′19″W
- Commonwealth: Puerto Rico
- Municipality: Utuado

Area
  - Total: 5.34 sq mi (13.8 km^{2})
  - Land: 4.77 sq mi (12.4 km^{2})
  - Water: 0.57 sq mi (1.5 km^{2})
- Elevation: 1,175 ft (358 m)

Population (2010)
  - Total: 965
  - Density: 202.3/sq mi (78.1/km^{2})
- Source: 2010 Census
- Time zone: UTC−4 (AST)

Caonillas Abajo is a barrio in the municipality of Utuado, Puerto Rico. Its population in 2010 was 965.

== History ==
Caonillas Abajo was in Spain's gazetteers until Puerto Rico was ceded by Spain in the aftermath of the Spanish–American War under the terms of the Treaty of Paris of 1898 and became an unincorporated territory of the United States. In 1899, the United States Department of War conducted a census of Puerto Rico finding that the population of Caonillas barrio was 2,378.

Historical population
Census	Pop.	Note	%±
1900	2,378		—
1910	1,232		−48.2%
1920	1,601		30.0%
1930	1,348		−15.8%
1940	1,831		35.8%
1950	2,188		19.5%
1960	1,803		−17.6%
1970	1,314		−27.1%
1980	1,136		−13.5%
1990	1,205		6.1%
2000	1,234		2.4%
2010	965		−21.8%
U.S. Decennial Census; 1899 (shown as 1900) 1910-1930; 1930-1950 1980-2000 2010

== Gallery ==
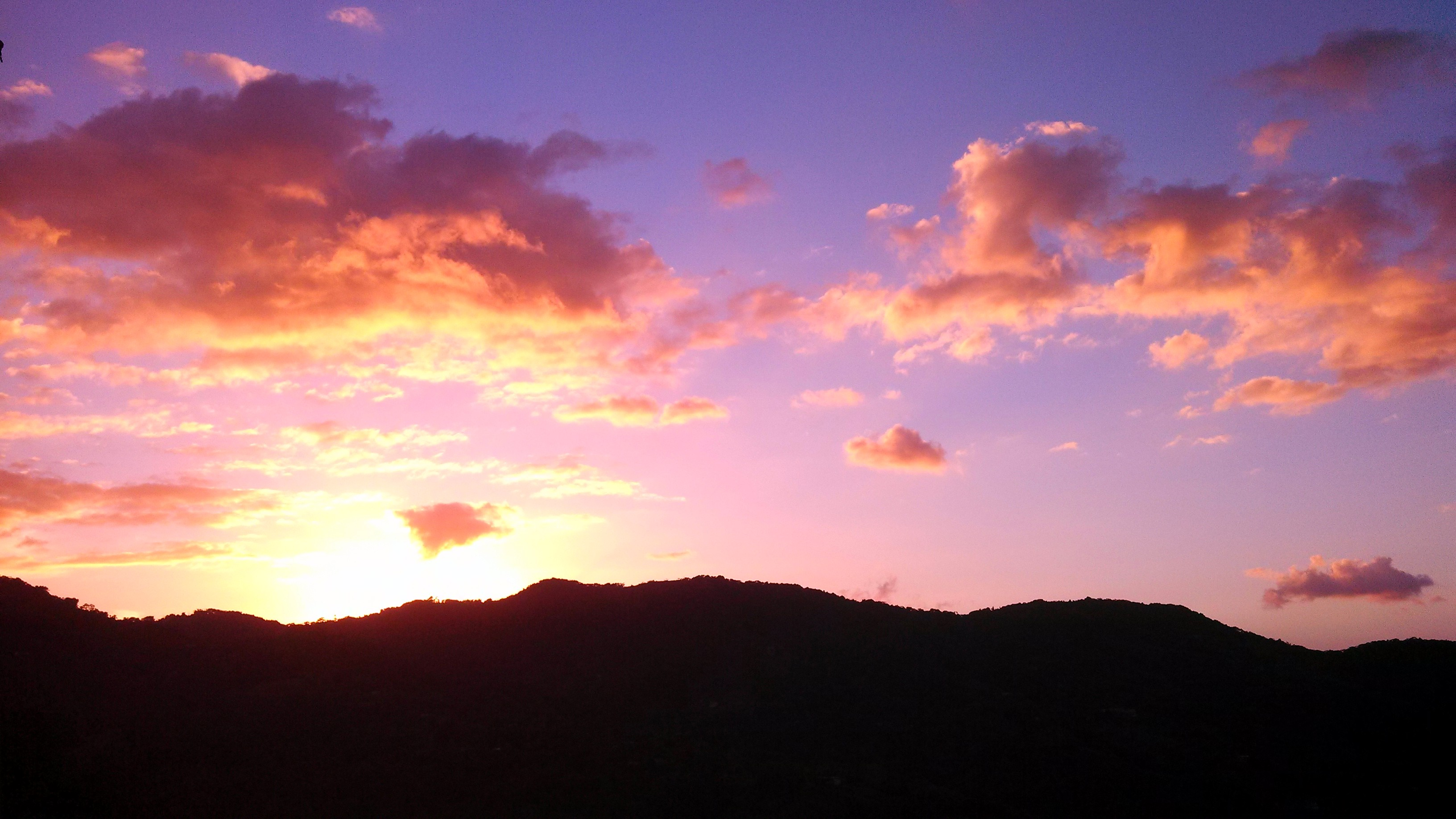
Sunset from Finca Vista Bella, a vineyard in Caonillas Abajo

== See also ==
- List of communities in Puerto Rico
