= Caonillas Arriba, Utuado, Puerto Rico =

Barrio of Puerto Rico

Caonillas Arriba
- Barrio
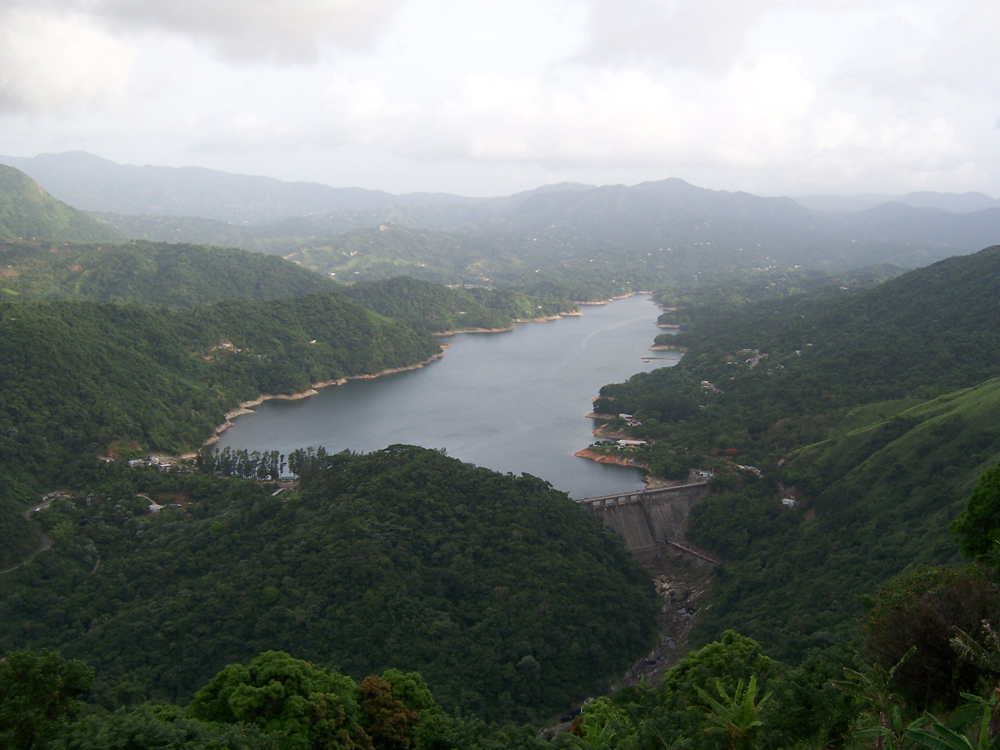
- Lago Caonillas within Barrios Caonillas Abajo, Caonillas Arriba, and Las Palmas

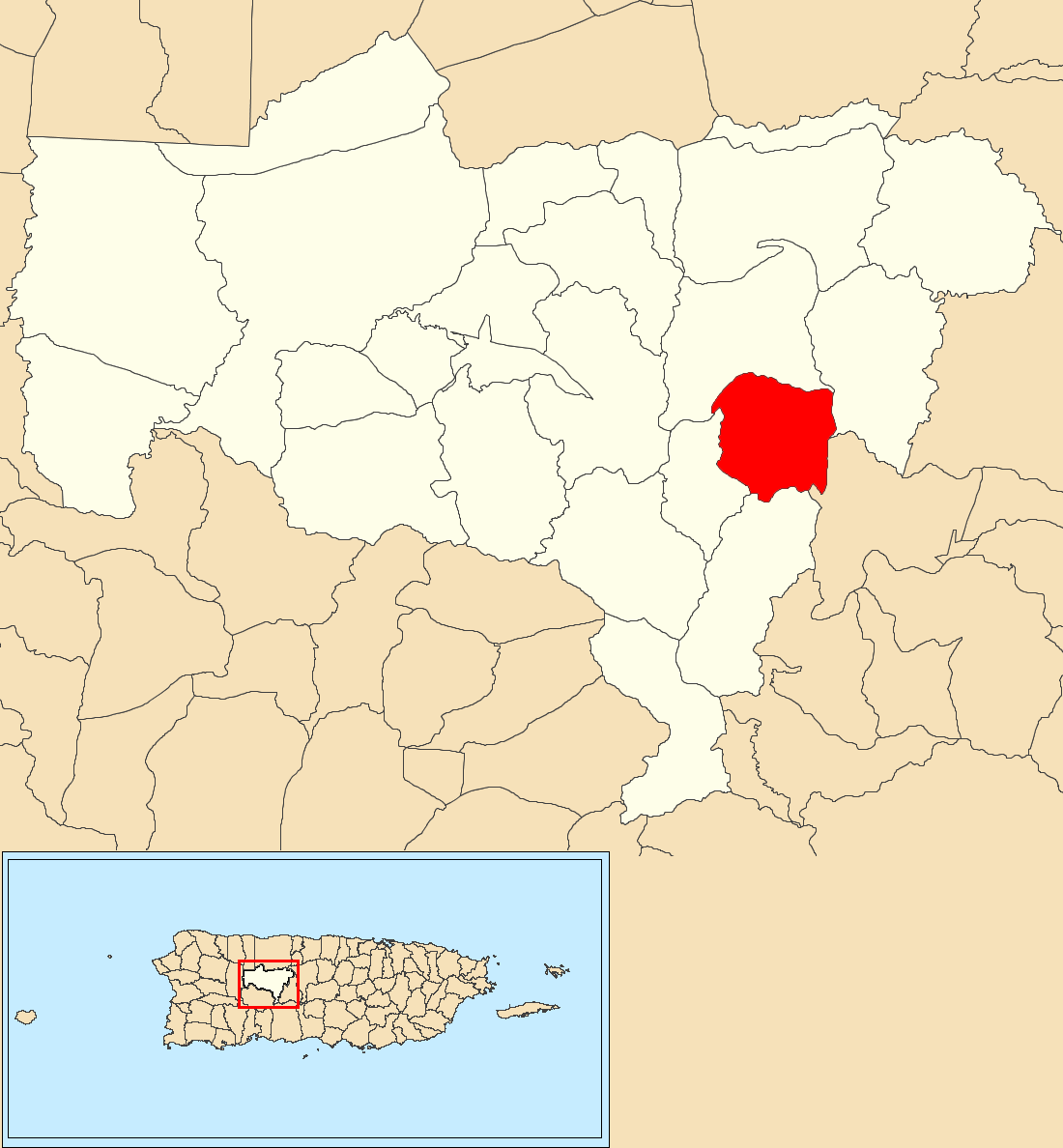
- Location of Caonillas Arriba within the municipality of Utuado shown in red

- Location of Puerto Rico
- Coordinates: 18°15′00″N 66°37′54″W
- Commonwealth: Puerto Rico
- Municipality: Utuado

Area
  - Total: 3.30 sq mi (8.5 km^{2})
  - Land: 3.01 sq mi (7.8 km^{2})
  - Water: 0.29 sq mi (0.75 km^{2})
- Elevation: 961 ft (293 m)

Population (2010)
  - Total: 296
  - Density: 98.3/sq mi (38.0/km^{2})
- Source: 2010 Census
- Time zone: UTC−4 (AST)

Caonillas Arriba is a barrio in the municipality of Utuado, Puerto Rico. Its population in 2010 was 296.

== History ==
Caonillas Arriba was in Spain's gazetteers until Puerto Rico was ceded by Spain in the aftermath of the Spanish–American War under the terms of the Treaty of Paris of 1898 and became an unincorporated territory of the United States. In 1899, the United States Department of War conducted a census of Puerto Rico finding that the population of Caonillas barrio was 2,378.

Historical population
Census	Pop.	Note	%±
1900	2,378		—
1910	902		−62.1%
1920	1,110		23.1%
1930	1,050		−5.4%
1940	972		−7.4%
1950	718		−26.1%
1960	579		−19.4%
1970	346		−40.2%
1980	277		−19.9%
1990	267		−3.6%
2000	395		47.9%
2010	296		−25.1%
U.S. Decennial Census; 1899 (shown as 1900) 1910-1930; 1930-1950 1980-2000 2010

== See also ==
- List of communities in Puerto Rico
