= Carretera Central (Puerto Rico) =

Highway in Puerto Rico

- Central Highway
- Carretera Militar; Military Highway

Route information
- Maintained by Puerto Rico DTPW
- Length: 134 km (83 mi)
- Existed: 1898–present
- Component highways: PR-1; PR-14

Major junctions
- South end: Avenida Eugenio María de Hostos in Playa
- PR-10 / PR-139 in Machuelo Abajo–Machuelo Arriba; PR-149 in Juana Díaz barrio-pueblo–Lomas; PR-138 / PR-153 in San Ildefonso; PR-173 in Robles–Plata; PR-15 in Cayey barrio-pueblo; PR-30 in Bairoa; PR-17 in Universidad–Hato Rey Sur; PR-23 in Hato Rey Central–Hato Rey Norte; PR-2 in Santurce; PR-16 / PR-26 in Santurce
- North end: La Fortaleza in San Juan Antiguo

Location
- Country: United States
- Territory: Puerto Rico
- Municipalities: Ponce, Juana Díaz, Coamo, Aibonito, Cayey, Cidra, Caguas, Guaynabo, San Juan

Highway system
- Roads in Puerto Rico; List
- Carretera Central
- U.S. National Register of Historic Places
- U.S. Historic district
- Location within Puerto Rico
- Location: Highway 14 from Cayey boundary to Coamo boundary (Note: The listed portion of the Carretera Central extends into Caguas, Cidra, Cayey, Aibonito, Coamo, and Juana Díaz. The roadway route in San Juan and Ponce, as well as a portion in Caguas, was excluded from the National Register listing.)
- Coordinates: 18°08′27″N 66°15′34″W
- Built: 1846–1886
- Built by: The Spanish administration
- Engineer: Raimundo Camprubí, Enrique Gadea, Manuel Maese, Manuel López de Bayo; Timoteo Luberza
- NRHP reference No.: 100003686
- Added to NRHP: May 2, 2019

The Carretera Central is a historic north–south central highway in Puerto Rico, linking the cities of San Juan and Ponce by way of Río Piedras, Caguas, Cayey, Aibonito, Coamo, and Juana Díaz. It crosses the Cordillera Central. Plans for the road started in the first half of the 19th century, and the road was fully completed in 1898. At the time the United States took possession of Puerto Rico in 1898, the Americans called it "the finest road in the Western Hemisphere."

A portion of the Carretera Central from partway through Caguas to the end of Juana Díaz was listed on the U.S. National Register of Historic Places in 2019.

== Route description ==
The highway runs from the north coast city of San Juan to the south coast city of Ponce via Río Piedras, Caguas, Cayey, Aibonito, Coamo, and Juana Díaz. The highway corridor is now signed as Puerto Rico Highway 14 from Ponce to Cayey, and as Puerto Rico Highway 1 from Cayey to San Juan.

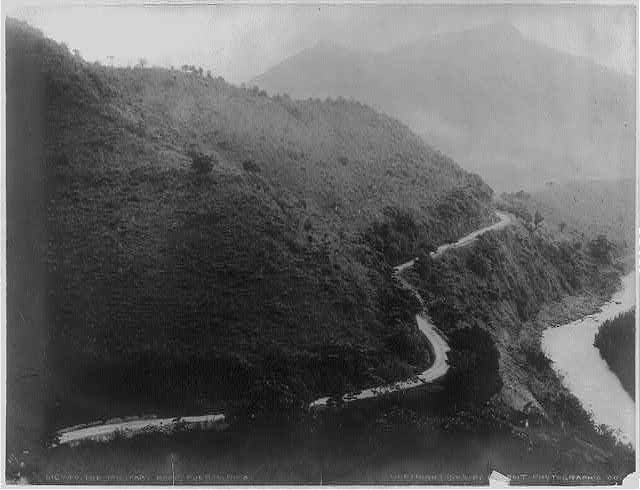
Carretera Central between mountain and stream (circa 1901–1903)

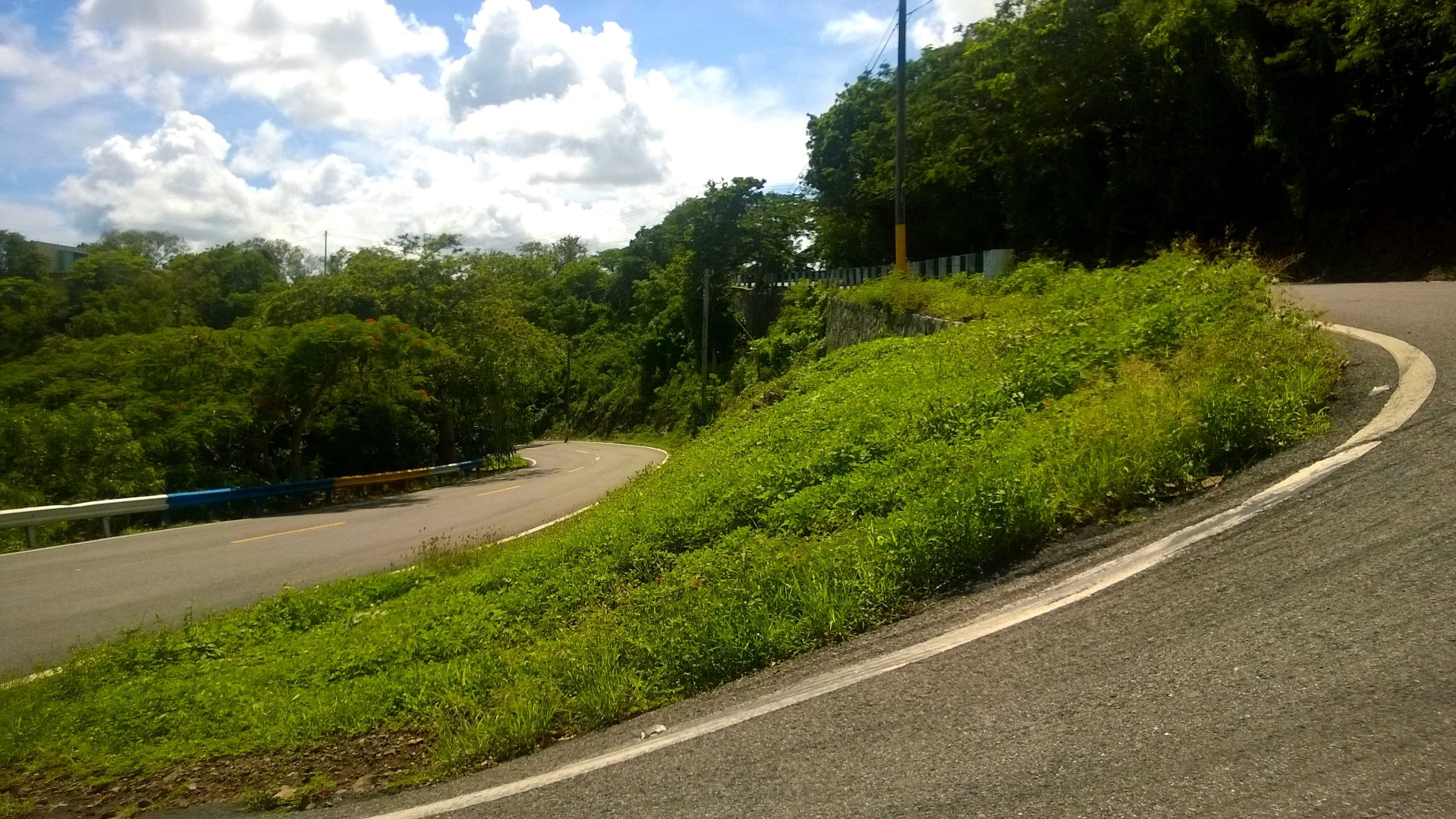
Carretera Central in Aibonito

== History ==
In the 1820s, the Spanish colonial government in Puerto Rico, under the direction of Governor Miguel de la Torre took the first steps for building a highway connecting the towns of San Juan and Río Piedras (Note: Río Piedras, today a part of San Juan, was a distinct town and municipality until 1951.) and incorporating temporary wooden bridges for river crossings.

During the 1830s an unpaved wagon road was built linking Ponce, Juana Díaz and Coamo to satisfy the commercial sugar production needs of that area. In 1846 a new masonry bridge was built by Spanish engineer Santiago Cortijo to connect the capital city island of San Juan with the rest of the Puerto Rico mainland. Meanwhile, construction of a 41-kilometer macadam highway between San Juan and Caguas, designed by Colonel engineer Diego Galvez, was begun. Construction of the San Juan-Caguas span was first under the direction of Colonel Tulio O'Neill and was later completed, in 1853, under Commander Santiago Cortijo. After the completion of the bridge over the Río Piedras river in 1853, the construction project completed bridges over Quebrada Frailes in 1855, the Concepción Bridge over Caguas's Río Cañas in 1856, and the bridge over the Caguas's Cagüitas River in 1857.

In 1858 Puerto Rican civil engineer Timoteo Luberza designed the paved highway between Coamo, at the southern foothills of Cordillera Central, and Juana Díaz, its first neighboring town due southwest, for the municipality of Coamo. Three years later, by 1861, a fair portion of this highway had already been completed.

The most challenging segment of Carretera Central, the one involving the mountainous segment between Caguas in the north and Coamo in the south, was built under the 1859 General Highway Plan, a complete highway plan to connect the coastal town with those in the mountainous interior. The plan was approved by the Spanish Crown in 1860 and it included the creation of "first order" and "second order" highways. In 1860, the central government commissioned engineer Niceto Blajot to design the paved version of Carretera Central between Ponce and Juana Díaz, which until then was a dirt and gravel road.

The then-municipal highways connecting Ponce, Juana Díaz and Coamo were made part of the state-run Carretera Central between 1875 and 1880. Meanwhile, the first stretch of road built exclusively under the Delegation of Public Works (equivalent to a department of public works) was the northern mountainside segment between Caguas and Cayey. This segment was started in 1875 and completed in 1881 under the direction of site engineers Raimundo Camprubi and Enrique Gadea-Giraldez. It was designed by engineer Manuel Lopez-Bayo.

On the southern mountainside of Cordillera Central, the stretch from Coamo to Aibonito was designed by Timoteo Luberza in 1861. Construction started in 1874 under Ricardo Campubri. It included 7.5 kilometers of the steep Asomante slopes, and was completed in 1881. The width of the road in this stretch was reduced from 6.5 meters to 6.0 meters, to reduce costs associated with building in such steep terrain. The segment between Aibonito and Cayey was designed by Manuel Lope-Bayo, begun in 1879 and completed in 1886. It included bridges over Quebrada Honda and Quebrada Toíta. As in the Coamo to Aibonito stretch, the stretch from Aibonito to Cayey has a width of 6.0 meters instead of 6.5 meters. The stretch was so treacherous that it was the last to be completed and the most expensive. It soon acquired the popular name La Piquiña.

Functional by 1886, Carretera Central was the first highway to cross Puerto Rico's east–west mountain range, the Cordillera Central. In 1886, it was a 134-kilometer (83 mi) route with 13 permanent bridges and 33 casillas de camineros (housing for road maintenance technicians). Contests were held for which roads had been best maintained, so that workers could be properly recognized and rewarded.

The Arenas Bridge, constructed in 1894 to bring the Carretera Central across the Río de la Plata, was the longest bridge constructed in Puerto Rico under Spanish government.

Macadamized "from end to end...into an almost solid floor," when the United States took possession of Puerto Rico in 1898, the editors of the American Harper's Weekly publication called Carretera Central, which was also known as Carretera Militar, "the finest road in the Western Hemisphere."

The road, spanning the entire length between San Juan and Ponce, was fully completed in 1898 and christened Carretera Central.

=== National Register of Historic Places ===
As one of the first modern roadways in Puerto Rico, being built from 1846 to 1886, and regarded as one of the finest roads in the Americas for years after its completion, a portion was listed on the National Register of Historic Places in 2019. The listed portion of the road, from Caguas to Juana Díaz, includes the exceptionally challenging engineering through the Cordillera Central, 11 major bridges, 14 maintenance workers' houses, (Note: Spanish: casillas de caminero.) and numerous other roadway structures.

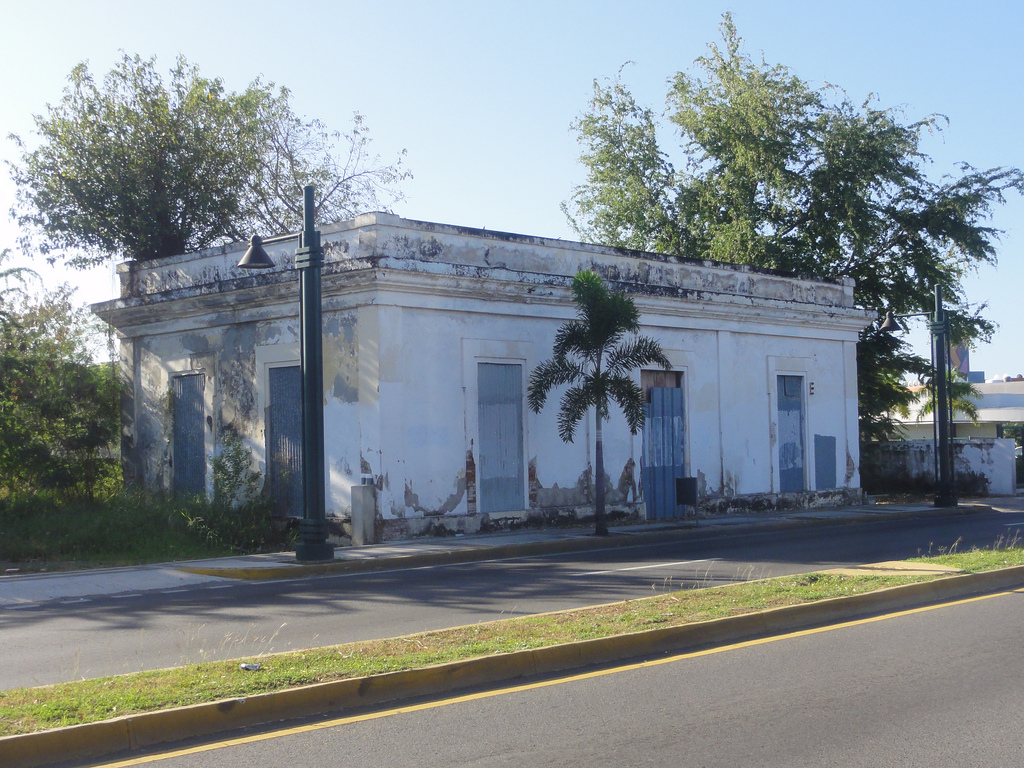
A former Casilla de Caminero on PR-14 (now Avenida Tito Castro) in Ponce, Puerto Rico

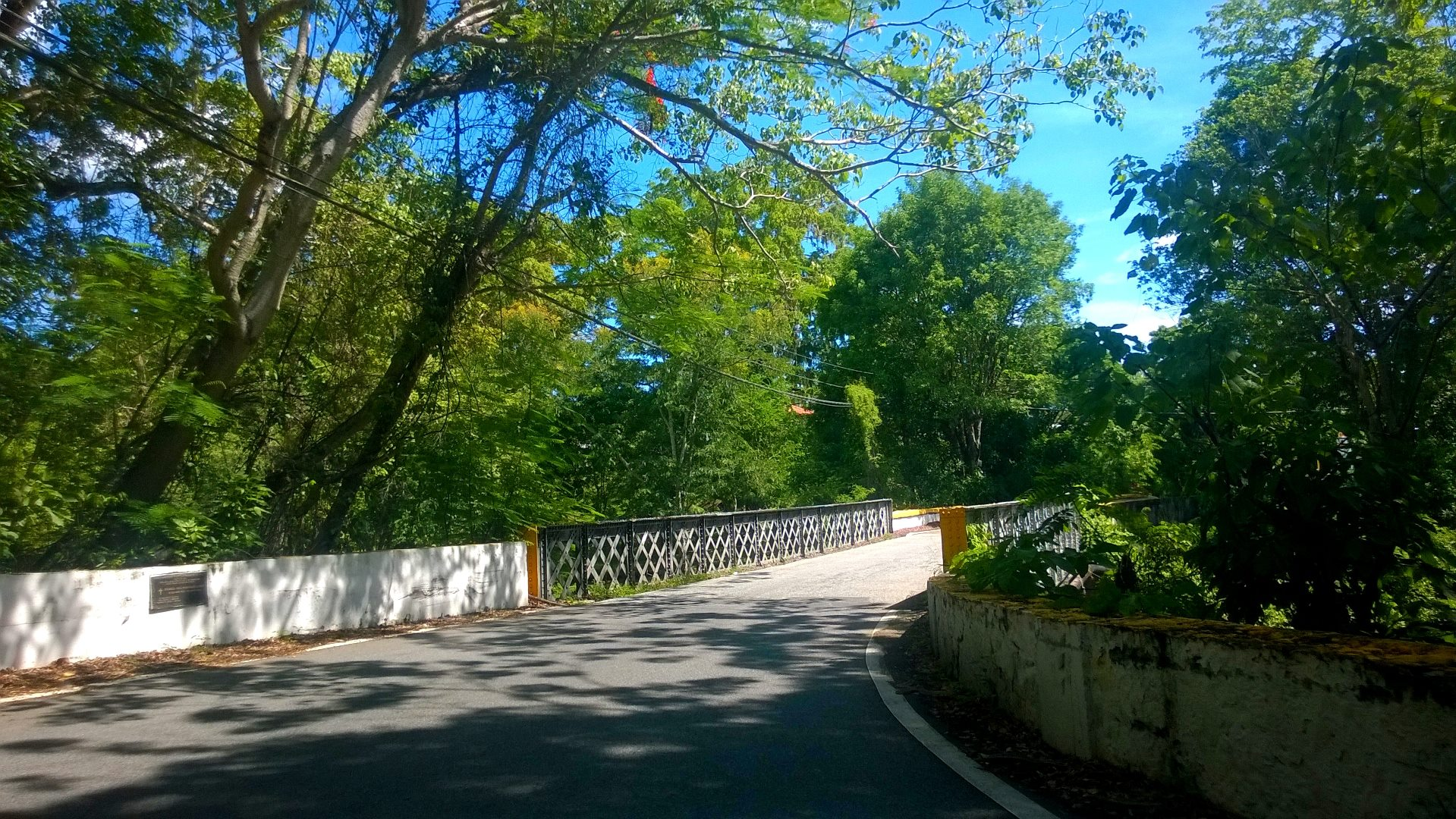
Puente de las Calabazas in Coamo (PR-14, near km 38.8)

=== Other facts ===
In 1898, during the Spanish–American War, American forces moved from south to north over the Carretara Central. One bridge was demolished by the Spanish to delay the American advance.

== Major intersections ==
Note: kilometer markers represent the distance along the current Puerto Rico numbered highways rather than the original Carretera Central.

Municipality	Location	km	mi	Destinations	Notes
Ponce	Playa			Avenida Hostos	Southern terminus of the Carretera Central; dead end road
Ponce	Playa	1.6	0.99	PR-123	Southern terminus through PR-123; unsigned
Ponce	See PR-123				
Ponce	Primero–Cuarto line	4.6 0.0	2.9 0.0	PR-14 north	One-way street; northern terminus through PR-123 and western terminus through PR-14
See PR-14
Cayey	Cayey barrio-pueblo–Monte Llano line	73.1 55.5	45.4 34.5	PR-1 – Caguas, Aibonito	Eastern terminus through PR-14 and southern terminus through PR-1
Cayey	Cayey barrio-pueblo–Monte Llano line	55.3 2.7	34.4 1.7	PR-735 north – Cidra	Seagull intersection; northern terminus through PR-1 and southern terminus through PR-735
Cayey	See PR-735				
Cayey	Vegas	0.0 53.6	0.0 33.3	PR-1	Northern terminus through PR-735 and southern terminus through PR-1; access to Caguas and Salinas
See PR-1
Caguas	Bairoa	30.5 4.6	19.0 2.9	PR-798	Northern terminus through PR-1 and southern terminus through PR-798
Caguas	See PR-798				
San Juan	Quebrada Arenas	0.0 25.9	0.0 16.1	PR-1 north (Carretera Felipe "La Voz" Rodríguez)	Northern terminus through PR-798 and southern terminus through PR-1; no access to PR-1 south; no access from PR-1
Guaynabo	Río	23.3 2.3	14.5 1.4	PR-173 / PR-8834 – Aguas Buenas	Northern terminus through PR-1 and southern terminus through PR-8834; access to Hato Nuevo and Sonadora
Guaynabo	Río	1.5	0.93	PR-834	Eastern terminus of PR-834; access to Hato Nuevo and Sonadora
Guaynabo	Río	0.0 21.0	0.0 13.0	PR-1 / PR-169 to PR-20 – Río Piedras, Caguas, Guaynabo, Camarones	Northern terminus through PR-8834 and southern terminus through PR-1; PR-20 access is via PR-1 south
San Juan	Tortugo	19.3 1.7	12.0 1.1	PR-873	Northern terminus through PR-1 and southern terminus through PR-873; unsigned
San Juan	See PR-873				
San Juan	Caimito	0.0 17.7	0.0 11.0	PR-1 south / PR-199 east / PR-Calle Turquesa (unsigned)	Northern terminus through PR-873 and southern terminus through PR-1; no access to PR-199 west; PR-1 north access is via PR-199 east; access to San Juan, Caguas and Trujillo Alto
San Juan	See PR-1				
San Juan	Monacillo Urbano	15.0– 14.6	9.3– 9.1	PR-18 north (Expreso Las Américas) – San Juan, Bayamón PR-52 south – Caguas, Ponce	Interchange; northern terminus through PR-1; no access to PR-52 from northbound
San Juan	Monacillo Urbano	Gap in route			
San Juan	Monacillo Urbano	1.2	0.75	PR-8838	Southern terminus through PR-8838
San Juan	See Avenida Juan Ponce de León				
San Juan	El Cinco	3.3 12.5	2.1 7.8	PR-1 north	Northern terminus through PR-8838 and southern terminus through PR-1; PR-1 south access (to Caguas) is at km 3.0; access to Río Piedras and Carolina
San Juan	Río Piedras	12.3	7.6	Puente de Río Piedras	
San Juan	Hato Rey Sur	12.1– 12.0	7.5– 7.5	PR-3 – Río Piedras, Carolina	Interchange; northern terminus through PR-1; unsigned
San Juan	Gap in route				
San Juan	Pueblo–Hato Rey Sur line	11.1	6.9	PR-3 west to PR-1 north	Southern terminus through PR-25; PR-3 west exit and PR-1 north entrance (to Hato Rey); unsigned
San Juan	See Avenida Juan Ponce de León				
San Juan	San Juan Antiguo	0.0	0.0	Old San Juan (Calle de la Fortaleza, Calle del Recinto Sur)	One-way streets; northern terminus through PR-25; PR-25P access is near km 0.2
San Juan	San Juan Antiguo			Northern terminus of the Carretera Central at La Fortaleza	
1.000 mi = 1.609 km; 1.000 km = 0.621 mi: Incomplete access; Route transition

== See also ==
- List of highways in Ponce, Puerto Rico
- Military road
- Ruta Panorámica
- 1953 Puerto Rico highway renumbering
