= Puerto Rico Highway 798 =

Highway in Puerto Rico

Highway 798
- Ruta 798

Route information
- Maintained by Puerto Rico DTPW
- Length: 4.6 km (2.9 mi)

Major junctions
- South end: PR-1 in Bairoa
- PR-796 in Río Cañas; PR-1 in Río Cañas; PR-799 in Río Cañas; PR-842 in Río Cañas
- North end: PR-1 in Quebrada Arenas

Location
- Country: United States
- Territory: Puerto Rico
- Municipalities: Caguas, San Juan

Highway system
- Roads in Puerto Rico; List
← PR-760	→ PR-802

Puerto Rico Highway 798 (PR-798) is a road located between the municipalities of Caguas, Puerto Rico, and San Juan, and it corresponds to an original segment of the historic Carretera Central. La Concepción Bridge is located on this route.

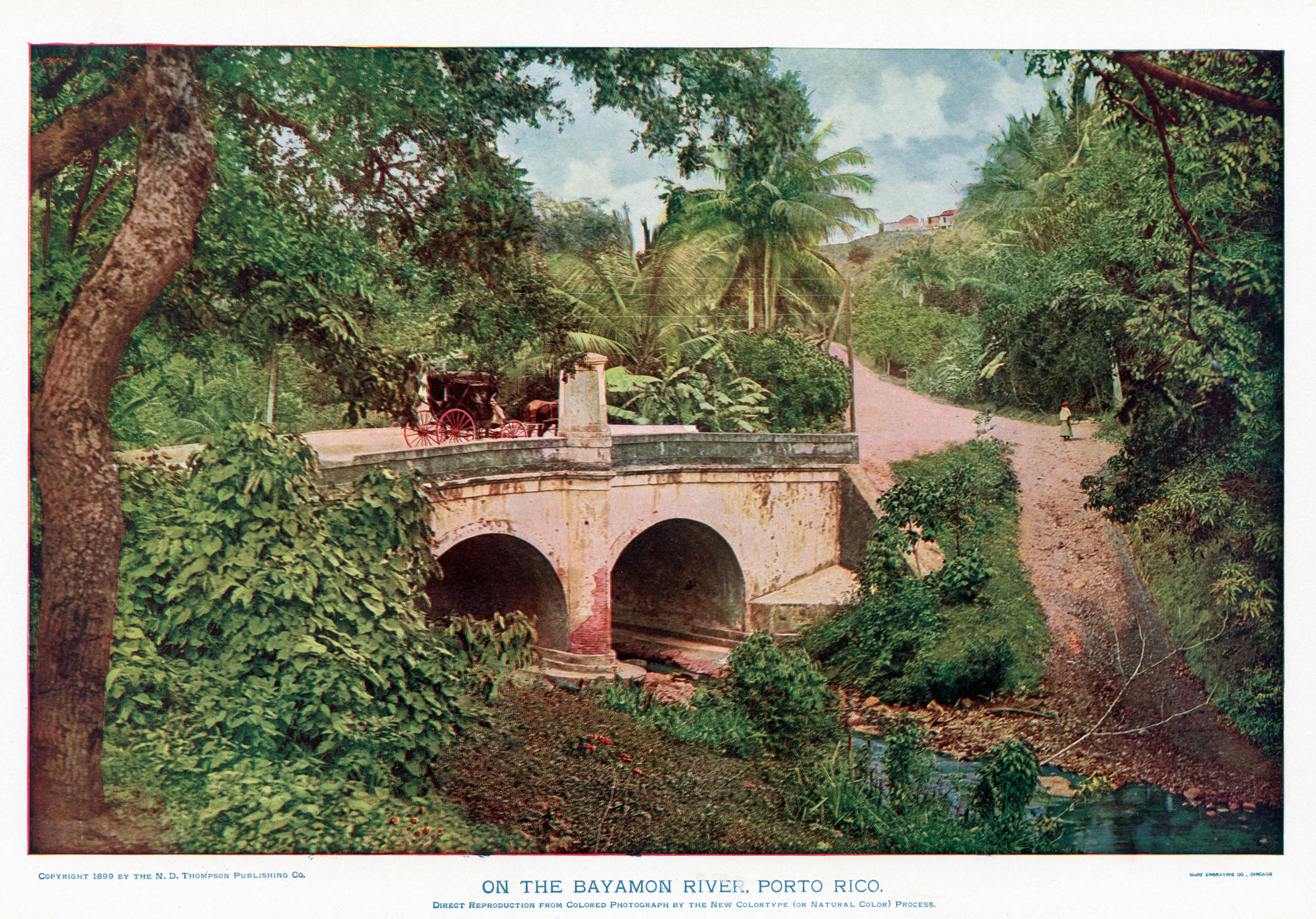
La Concepción Bridge (1899)

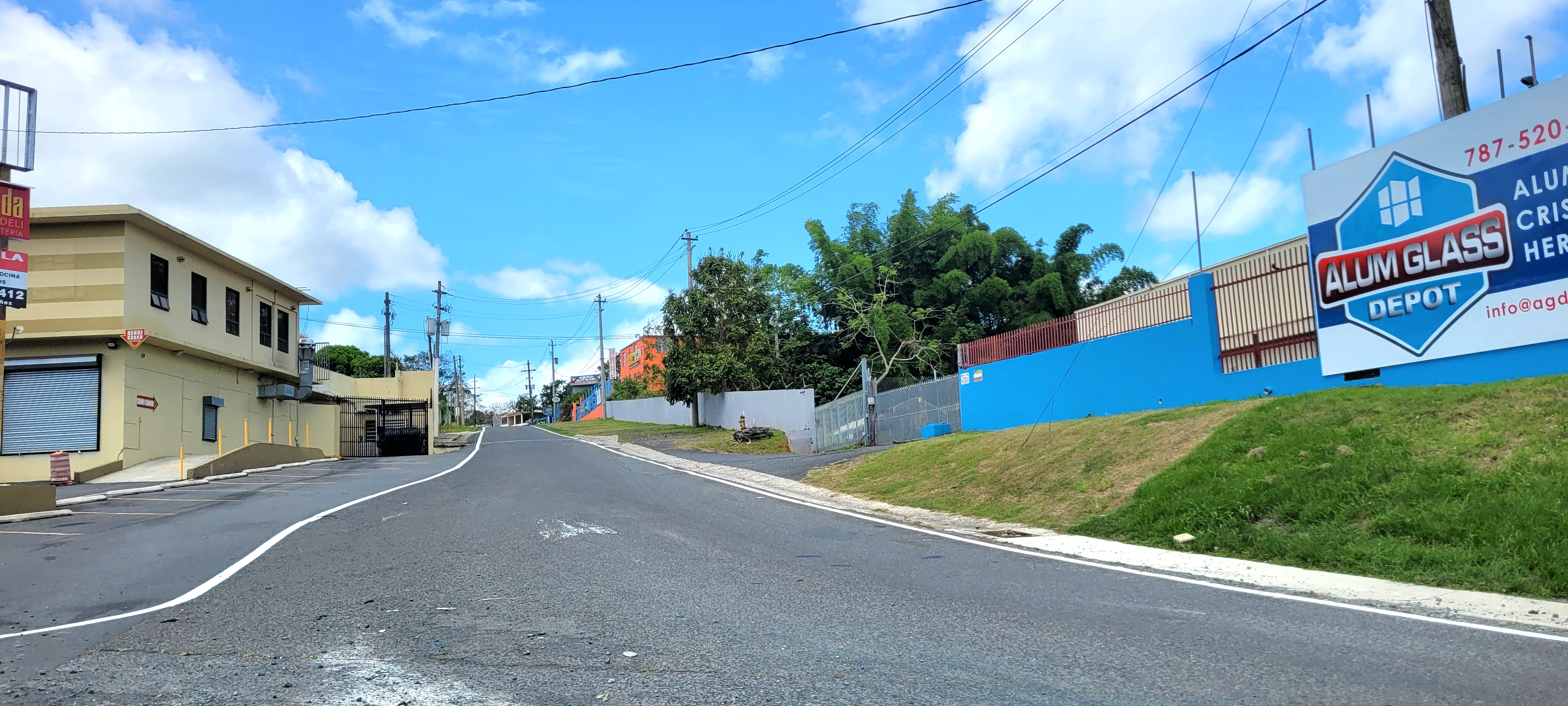
Puerto Rico Highway 798 south in Río Cañas, Caguas

== Major intersections ==
Municipality	Location	km	mi	Destinations	Notes
Caguas	Bairoa	4.6	2.9	PR-1 (Carretera Miguel Hernández Rodríguez) – Caguas, Río Piedras	Southern terminus of PR-798; the Carretera Central continues toward Caguas
Caguas	Río Cañas	4.1	2.5	PR-796 – Bairoa	
Caguas	Río Cañas	3.2– 3.1	2.0– 1.9	To PR-1 (Carretera Miguel Hernández Rodríguez) – Caguas, Río Piedras	
Caguas	Río Cañas	2.8 28.9 (Note: Kilometer markers represent the distance along PR-1 rather than PR-798.)	1.7 18.0	PR-1 north (Carretera Miguel Hernández Rodríguez) – Río Piedras	Southern terminus of PR-1 concurrency; no access to PR-1 south; no access from PR-1
Caguas	Río Cañas	28.5 2.7	17.7 1.7	PR-1 (Carretera Miguel Hernández Rodríguez) – Caguas, Río Piedras	Northern terminus of PR-1 concurrency
Caguas	Río Cañas	1.5	0.93	Puente La Concepción over the Río Cañas	
Caguas	Río Cañas	0.9	0.56	PR-799 – Río Cañas	
Caguas	Río Cañas	0.6	0.37	PR-1 (Carretera Miguel Hernández Rodríguez) – Caguas, Río Piedras	Right turn only; no left turn from PR-1; no access across PR-1
Caguas	Río Cañas	0.3	0.19	PR-842 – Caimito	
Caguas	Río Cañas	0.2	0.12	To PR-1 (Carretera Miguel Hernández Rodríguez) / PR-797 – Caguas, Río Piedras, Aguas Buenas	
San Juan	Quebrada Arenas	0.0	0.0	PR-1 north (Carretera Felipe "La Voz" Rodríguez) – Río Piedras	Northern terminus of PR-798; no access to PR-1 south; no access from PR-1; the Carretera Central continues toward Guaynabo
1.000 mi = 1.609 km; 1.000 km = 0.621 mi: Concurrency terminus; Incomplete access
