= Río Cañas (Caguas, Puerto Rico) =

River of Puerto Rico

Coordinates: 18.2888415°N 66.0296098°W

Location
- Commonwealth: Puerto Rico
- Municipality: Caguas

Physical characteristics
- Source
  - location: Altos de la Mesa in Jagüeyes, Aguas Buenas
- Mouth
  - location: Loíza River in Río Cañas, Caguas
  - elevation: 135 ft.
- Length: 9 km

Basin features
- Waterfalls: Prieto Falls

The Cañas River (Spanish: Río Cañas) is a tributary of the Loíza River that flows through the municipalities of Aguas Buenas and Caguas in Puerto Rico. It has its source in the northward slopes in the Aguas Buenas side of Altos de la Mesa, flowing downstream through the Caguas barrio of the same name before emptying in the Loíza Lake (also known as Carraízo Lake), a reservoir of the Loíza River created by the Carraízo Dam.

The historic La Concepcion Bridge, built in 1856 as part of the then called "Río Piedras-Caguas Highway" portion of the Carretera Central, crosses it close to PR-1.

== See also ==
- List of rivers of Puerto Rico
