= Puerto Rico Highway 1 =

Highway in Puerto Rico

Highway 1
- Ruta 1

Route information
- Maintained by Puerto Rico DTPW
- Length: 128.1 km (79.6 mi)

Major junctions
- South end: PR-123 in Primero–Segundo
- PR-2 / PR-133 in San Antón; PR-52 in Vayas; PR-3 in Salinas barrio-pueblo; PR-52 in Lapa; PR-30 / PR-52 in Bairoa; PR-18 / PR-52 in Monacillo Urbano; PR-3 in Hato Rey Sur; PR-17 in Hato Rey Sur; PR-22 in Santurce; PR-16 / PR-25 / PR-26 in Santurce
- North end: Calle Tanca in San Juan Antiguo

Location
- Country: United States
- Territory: Puerto Rico
- Municipalities: Ponce, Juana Díaz, Santa Isabel, Salinas, Aibonito, Cayey, Cidra, Caguas, Aguas Buenas, Guaynabo, San Juan

Highway system
- Roads in Puerto Rico; List
| ← PR-9189 | → PR-2 |

Puerto Rico Highway 1 (PR-1) is a highway in Puerto Rico that connects the city of Ponce to San Juan. Leaving Ponce, the road heads east and follows a somewhat parallel route along the southern coast of the island heading towards Salinas. At Salinas, the road turns north to cut through the Cordillera Central in its approach to San Juan. Before reaching San Juan, it climbs to make its way to the mountain town of Cayey and then it winds down into the city of Caguas on its final approach to San Juan.

== Route description ==
Map of the southern terminus of PR-1 in the municipality of Ponce

PR-1 starts in Ponce and ends in San Juan. The route connects important cities such as Salinas, Cayey, and Caguas.

In Ponce, PR-1 intersects PR-2 and PR-52. One of the major roads in Ponce that PR-1 does not intersect is PR-10, which is accessible via an alternate route (PR-5506) through Mercedita Airport. A sign on PR-1 alerts drivers on where to get off to access PR-10.

PR-1 passes through a small portion of the central town of Cidra, merely off the border with Cayey; the exit from PR-52 to Guavate is less than 1 hectometer from the town, and going north all structures and buildings off the road on the right are in Cayey, while the road itself and everything on the left is in Cidra until it enters Caguas just passing the junction with PR-787, which connects PR-1 to the rest of Cidra. This means that Cidra can be reached quickly from the main tollway (PR-52) via Exit 32 to Guavate.

PR-1 is an undivided two-lane road, with some exceptions. In Ponce, it is a six-lane divided highway in its intersection with PR-578 and PR-2 in Sabanetas. There is a short segment in Cayey where PR-1 is also a divided highway. It becomes a divided road once again from Caguas to San Juan at a sector known as "La Muda".

PR-1 is roughly parallel to PR-52 throughout its entire length. Prior to PR-52's inauguration, PR-1 was the route of choice from traveling between Ponce and San Juan.

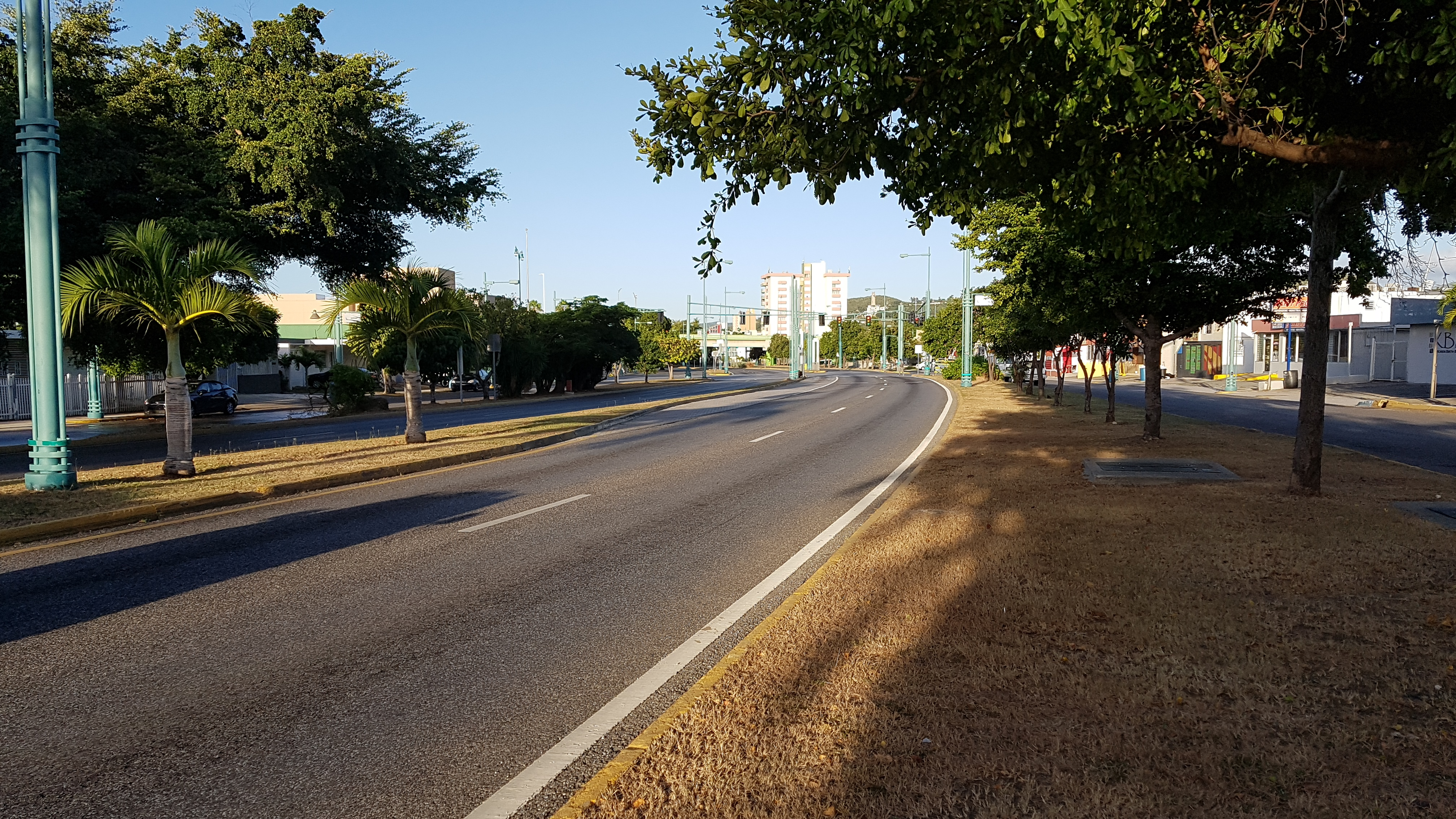
PR-1 west in Ponce, heading towards downtown Ponce

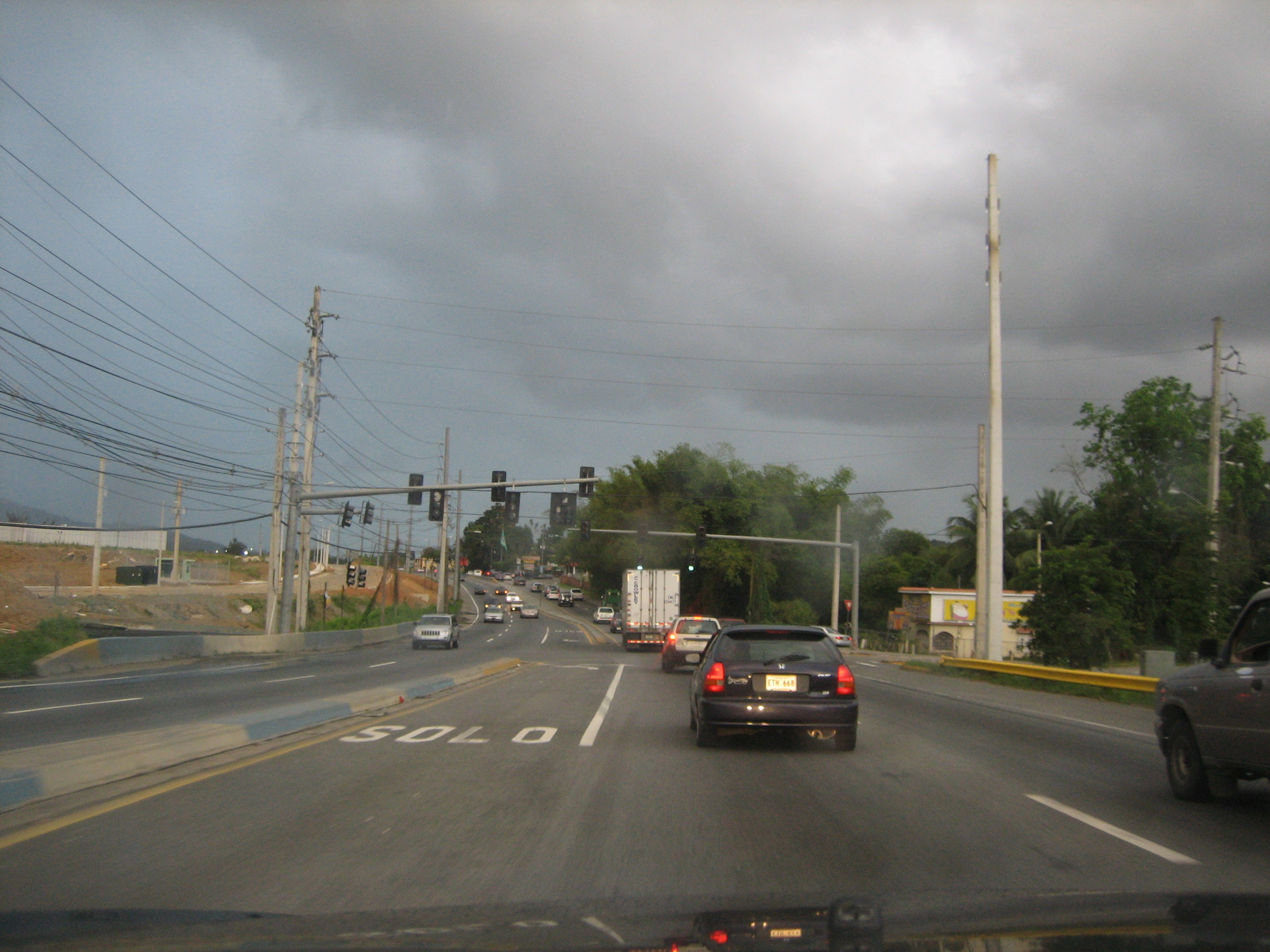
PR-1 heading south from San Juan to Caguas, near La Muda

=== Signing ===
PR-1 is signed "PR-1 East" in the segment that travels from Ponce to Salinas, and then signed "PR-1 North" in the segment that travels from Salinas to San Juan. Likewise, the road is signed "PR-1 South" in the segment that travels from San Juan to Salinas and then signed "PR-1 West" in the segment that travels from Salinas to Ponce.

== History ==
Construction of what became PR-1 began with the building of the Carretera Central, started during the governorship of Miguel de la Torre (1822–1837). A small section from San Juan to Río Piedras was then started. The Carretera Central proceeds south to Cayey along the route of the PR-1, then diverges, and was completed in 1887, taking over 50 years to complete. The Road was also known as La Carretera Militar (The Military Road). The modern PR-1 was opened on 10 March 1907.

== Major intersections ==
All exits are unnumbered.

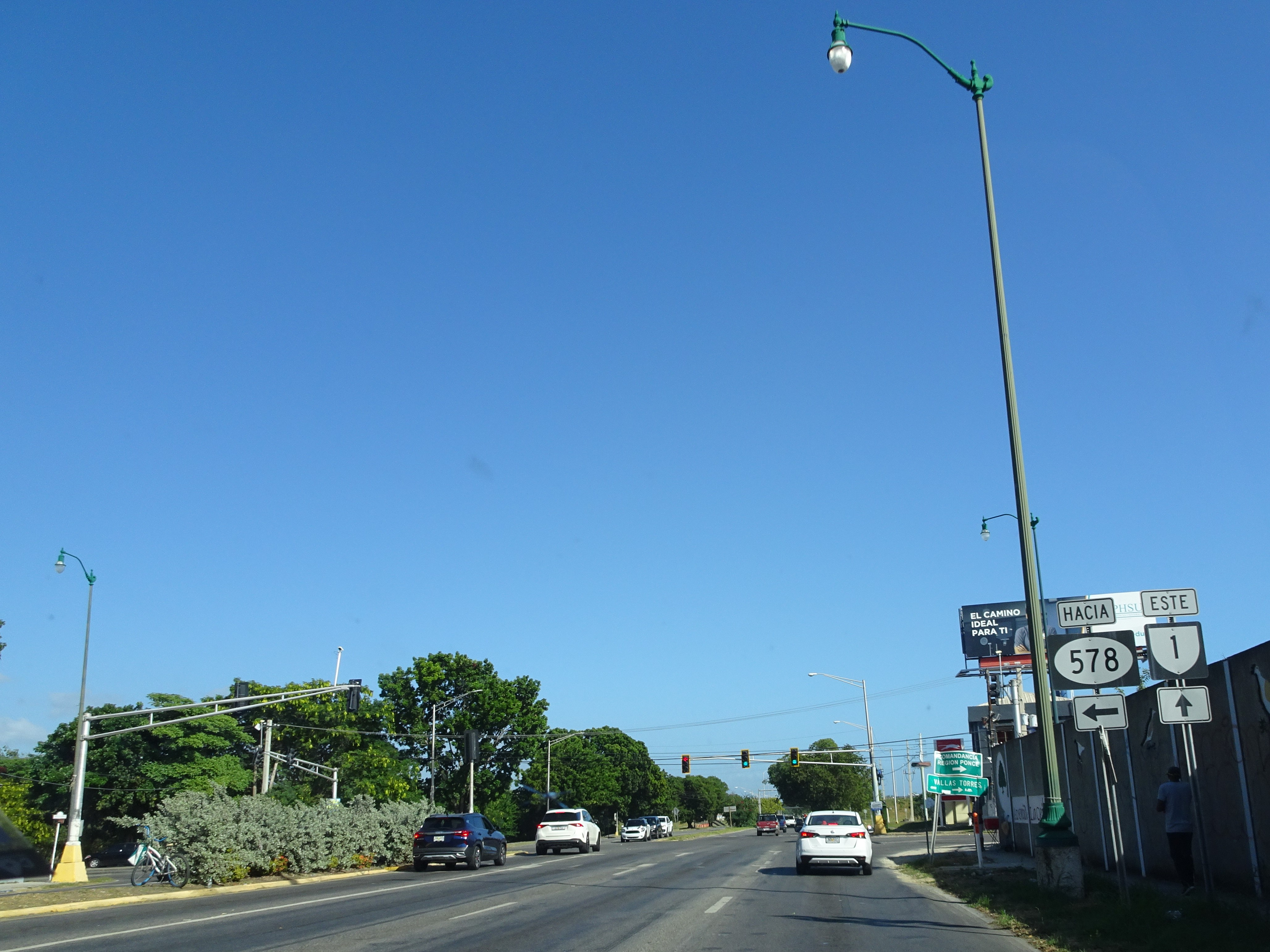
PR-1 east at Avenida Los Caobos junction, a connector to PR-578 between Bucaná and Vayas barrios, Ponce

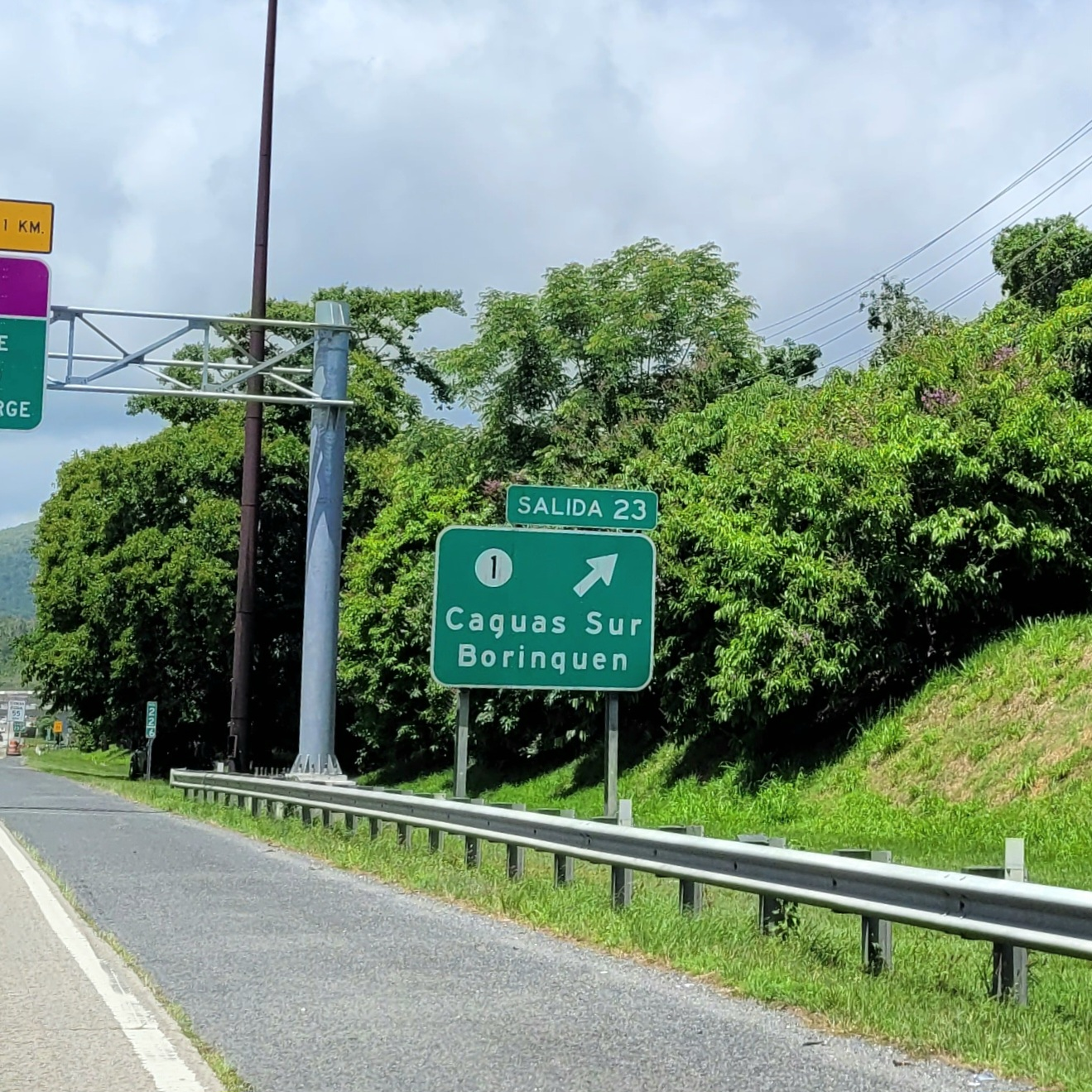
PR-52 south at exit 23 to PR-1 in Turabo, Caguas

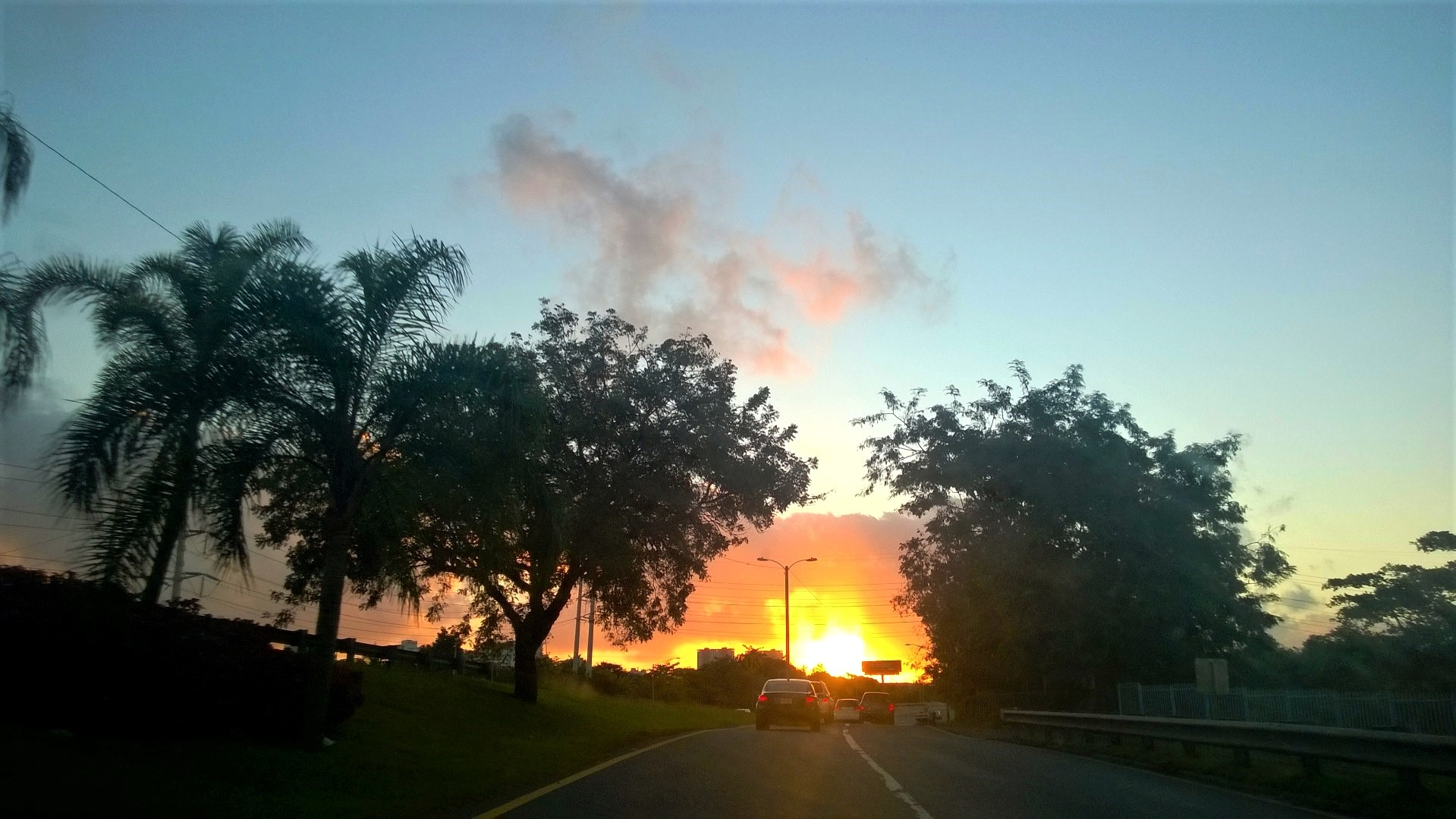
Entrance ramp to PR-1 south in Santurce, San Juan

| Municipality | Location | km | mi | Destinations | Notes |
|---|---|---|---|---|---|
| Ponce | Primero–Segundo line | 128.1 | 79.6 | PR-123 south (Calle Villa) – Ponce | Southern terminus of PR-1; one-way street; northbound access via Calle Reina Isabel |
| Ponce | Segundo | 127.7 | 79.3 | PR-14R (Calle Unión) – Ponce | One-way street |
| Ponce | Tercero–Quinto line | 127.3 | 79.1 | PR-14 north (Calle Salud) – Juana Díaz | One-way street |
| Ponce | Tercero | 127.0– 126.9 | 78.9– 78.9 | PR-1P east (Calle Cristina) – Ponce | One-way street; PR-1P eastbound access via Calle Montaner |
| Ponce | Río Portugués | 126.9 | 78.9 | Puente de los Leones | |
| Ponce | San Antón | 126.4 | 78.5 | PR-12 south (Avenida Santiago de los Caballeros) – Playa | Incomplete diamond interchange; southbound exit and entrance |
| Ponce | San Antón | 125.3– 125.2 | 77.9– 77.8 | PR-2 west (Ponce Bypass) / PR-133 north (Avenida Ednita Nazario) – Ponce, Peñuelas, Mayagüez | |
| Ponce | Vayas | 123.8 | 76.9 | PR-52 (Autopista Luis A. Ferré) – Juana Díaz, San Juan, Mayagüez | PR-52 exits 101A and 101B; cloverleaf interchange |
| Ponce | Vayas–Sabanetas line | 122.6 | 76.2 | PR-5506 north – Aeropuerto Mercedita | |
| Juana Díaz | Río Jacaguas | 117.9– 117.8 | 73.3– 73.2 | Puente Juan Ponce de León | |
| Juana Díaz | Capitanejo–Cintrona line | 114.3 | 71.0 | PR-149 – Juana Díaz | |
| Santa Isabel | Boca Velázquez | 104.7– 104.6 | 65.1– 65.0 | PR-161 east (Desvío Norte Luis Muñoz Marín) – San Juan, Salinas, Coamo | |
| Santa Isabel | Santa Isabel barrio-pueblo | 102.9 | 63.9 | PR-153 north (Calle Eugenio María de Hostos) – Coamo | One-way street |
| Santa Isabel | Felicia 1 | 102.0 | 63.4 | PR-161 west (Desvío Norte Luis Muñoz Marín) – Ponce | |
| Salinas | Río Nigua | 91.4– 91.3 | 56.8– 56.7 | Puente de los Poleos | |
| Salinas | Salinas barrio-pueblo | 90.8 | 56.4 | PR-3 east (Calle Doctor Santos P. Amadeo) – Guayama | |
| Salinas | Salinas barrio-pueblo | 89.8 | 55.8 | PR-180 (Avenida Pedro Albizu Campos) – Guayama | |
| Salinas | Lapa | 89.2 | 55.4 | PR-52 (Autopista Luis A. Ferré) – Ponce, San Juan | PR-52 exit 65 |
| Aibonito | No major junctions | | | | |
| Salinas | No major junctions | | | | |
| Aibonito | Cuyón | 69.1 | 42.9 | PR-162 – Aibonito | |
| Cayey | Pedro Avila–Pasto Viejo line | 66.0 | 41.0 | PR-7722 west (Ruta Panorámica) – Aibonito | Southern terminus of the Ruta Panorámica concurrency |
| Cayey | Sumido–Matón Arriba line | 61.1 | 38.0 | PR-715 (Ruta Panorámica) – Cercadillo | Northern terminus of the Ruta Panorámica concurrency; the Ruta Panorámica continues toward Guayama |
| Cayey | Matón Arriba | 60.3 | 37.5 | PR-206 north to PR-170 (Avenida Roberto Díaz) – Cayey, Aibonito | Seagull intersection |
| Cayey | Quebrada Arriba–Monte Llano– Cayey barrio-pueblo tripoint | 58.4 | 36.3 | PR-15 – Cayey, Guayama | |
| Cayey | Monte Llano–Cayey barrio-pueblo line | 56.7– 56.6 | 35.2– 35.2 | PR-7715 south to PR-52 (Autopista Luis A. Ferré) – San Juan, Ponce | PR-52 exit 39; roundabout |
| Cayey | Monte Llano–Cayey barrio-pueblo line | 55.5 | 34.5 | PR-14 west (Carretera Central) – Cayey | Southern terminus of the Carretera Central concurrency; the Carretera Central continues toward Aibonito |
| Cayey | Monte Llano–Cayey barrio-pueblo line | 55.3 | 34.4 | PR-735 north (Carretera Central) – Cidra | Northern terminus of the Carretera Central concurrency; seagull intersection |
| Cayey | Vegas | 53.6 | 33.3 | PR-735 west (Carretera Central) – Cidra | Southern terminus of the Carretera Central concurrency |
| Cidra | Beatriz | 50.4 | 31.3 | PR-184 south – Patillas, Guavate | |
| Caguas | Quebrada Las Quebradillas | 41.0 | 25.5 | Puente Las Quebradillas | |
| Caguas | Turabo | 37.5 | 23.3 | PR-32 (Avenida Luis Muñoz Marín) – Cidra, San Lorenzo | |
| Caguas | Caguas barrio-pueblo | 36.9– 36.8 | 22.9– 22.9 | PR-172 west (Avenida Pino) – Cidra | |
| Caguas | Caguas barrio-pueblo | 36.5 | 22.7 | PR-34 (Avenida Federico Degetau) – San Juan, San Lorenzo | |
| Caguas | Caguas barrio-pueblo | 35.9 | 22.3 | PR-33 (Avenida José Mercado) – Aguas Buenas, San Lorenzo | |
| Caguas | Caguas barrio-pueblo | 35.3 | 21.9 | PR-183 east (Calle Eduardo Georgetti) – San Lorenzo | One-way street |
| Caguas | Caguas barrio-pueblo | 35.0 | 21.7 | PR-156 west (Calle Ramón Emeterio Betances) – Aguas Buenas | One-way street; westbound access via Calle Segundo Ruiz Belvis |
| Caguas | Caguas barrio-pueblo | 34.5– 34.4 | 21.4– 21.4 | PR-33 west (Avenida José Mercado) / PR-189 east (Avenida José Villares) – Aguas Buenas, Gurabo | |
| Caguas | Caguas barrio-pueblo | 34.0– 33.9 | 21.1– 21.1 | PR-196 west (Avenida Garrido) – Aguas Buenas | |
| Caguas | Caguas barrio-pueblo | 33.3– 33.2 | 20.7– 20.6 | PR-32 east (Avenida Luis Muñoz Marín) – Gurabo | |
| Caguas | Bairoa | 32.2 | 20.0 | PR-30 east (Expreso Cruz Ortiz Stella) – Gurabo, Humacao | Trumpet interchange |
| Caguas | Bairoa | 31.6 | 19.6 | PR-52 (Autopista Luis A. Ferré) – San Juan, Bayamón, Carolina, Cayey, Ponce | PR-52 exits 14, 15, 15A and 15B; partial cloverleaf interchange |
| Caguas | Bairoa | 30.5 | 19.0 | PR-798 (Carretera Central) – Río Cañas | Northern terminus of the Carretera Central concurrency; the Carretera Central continues toward Guaynabo |
| Caguas | Río Cañas | 28.9 | 18.0 | PR-798 (Carretera Central) – Río Cañas | Southern terminus of the Carretera Central concurrency; one-way street; southbound access at km 29.3; the Carretera Central continues toward Caguas |
| Caguas | Río Cañas | 28.5 | 17.7 | PR-798 (Carretera Central) – Río Cañas | Northern terminus of the Carretera Central concurrency; the Carretera Central continues toward Guaynabo |
| Caguas | Río Cañas | 27.9 | 17.3 | PR-175 – Trujillo Alto, Carraízo | |
| Caguas | Río Cañas | 26.1 | 16.2 | PR-797 west to PR-798 (Carretera Central) – Aguas Buenas | |
| Aguas Buenas | No major junctions | | | | |
| San Juan | Quebrada Arenas | 25.9 | 16.1 | PR-798 (Carretera Central) – Río Cañas | Southern terminus of the Carretera Central concurrency; one-way street; southbound access at PR-797; the Carretera Central continues toward Caguas |
| Guaynabo | Río | 23.3 | 14.5 | PR-173 / PR-8834 (Carretera Central) – Aguas Buenas, Hato Nuevo, Sonadora | Northern terminus of the Carretera Central concurrency; the Carretera Central continues toward San Juan |
| Guaynabo | Río | 21.3 | 13.2 | PR-20 north (Expreso Rafael Martínez Nadal) – Guaynabo | |
| Guaynabo | Río | 21.0 | 13.0 | PR-169 / PR-8834 (Carretera Central) – Guaynabo, Hato Nuevo, Sonadora | Southern terminus of the Carretera Central concurrency; the Carretera Central continues toward Caguas |
| San Juan | Tortugo | 19.3 | 12.0 | PR-873 (Carretera Central) – Tortugo | Northern terminus of the Carretera Central concurrency; the Carretera Central continues toward San Juan |
| San Juan | Caimito | 17.6– 17.5 | 10.9– 10.9 | PR-199 (Avenida Doña Felisa Rincón de Gautier) – Guaynabo, Caimito, Cupey | Partial cloverleaf interchange |
| San Juan | Monacillo–Monacillo Urbano line | 16.4 | 10.2 | PR-177 (Avenida Lomas Verdes) – Guaynabo, Bayamón, Cupey | Partial cloverleaf interchange |
| San Juan | Monacillo Urbano | 15.0– 14.6 | 9.3– 9.1 | PR-18 north (Expreso Las Américas) / PR-52 south (Autopista Luis A. Ferré) – San Juan, Bayamón, Caguas, Ponce | No access to PR-52 from northbound |
| San Juan | El Cinco | 13.3– 12.9 | 8.3– 8.0 | PR-21 west (Avenida Ingeniero José "Kiko" Custodio) / PR-176 south (Avenida Ana G. Méndez) – Guaynabo, Bayamón, Cupey | |
| San Juan | El Cinco | 12.5 | 7.8 | PR-8838 (Avenida Juan Ponce de León) – Cupey | Southern terminus of the Carretera Central concurrency; one-way street; southbound access at km 12.9; the Carretera Central continues toward Guaynabo |
| San Juan | Río Piedras | 12.3 | 7.6 | Puente de Río Piedras | |
| San Juan | Hato Rey Sur | 12.1– 12.0 | 7.5– 7.5 | PR-3 east (Avenida 65 de Infantería) – Carolina | Northern terminus of the Carretera Central concurrency |
| San Juan | Hato Rey Sur | 10.8 | 6.7 | PR-17 (Avenida Jesús T. Piñero) to PR-18 (Expreso Las Américas) – San Juan, Carolina | Partial cloverleaf interchange |
| San Juan | Hato Rey Norte | 9.3 | 5.8 | PR-41 (Calle Eleanor Roosevelt) – Hato Rey | |
| San Juan | Hato Rey Norte | 9.0 | 5.6 | PR-23 (Avenida Franklin Delano Roosevelt) – Hato Rey | |
| San Juan | Santurce | 6.4– 6.2 | 4.0– 3.9 | PR-22 (Autopista José de Diego) to PR-18 (Expreso Las Américas) – Bayamón, Caguas, Carolina, Santurce | PR-22 exits 1A and 1B; partial cloverleaf interchange |
| San Juan | Santurce | 5.5– 5.4 | 3.4– 3.4 | PR-2 to PR-39 (Calle Cerra) – Bayamón, Guaynabo, Zona Portuaria, Santurce | Partial cloverleaf interchange; no access to PR-2 eastbound from southbound |
| San Juan | Santurce | 3.35 | 2.08 | PR-16 south (Bulevar Román Baldorioty de Castro) / PR-25 south (Avenida Juan Ponce de León) / PR-26 east (Expreso Román Baldorioty de Castro) – Santurce, Carolina | Southern terminus of PR-25 and the Carretera Central concurrencies; PR-25 southbound access via PR-16; the Carretera Central continues toward Santurce |
| San Juan | Caño de San Antonio | 3.25 | 2.02 | Puente San Antonio and Puente Guillermo Esteves | |
| San Juan | San Juan Antiguo | 3.05 | 1.90 | PR-25 north (Avenida de la Constitución) / PR-25P north (Avenida Luis Muñoz Rivera) / PR-Avenida Ashford – San Juan, Condado | Northern terminus of PR-25 and the Carretera Central concurrencies; PR-25 and Carretera Central northbound access via PR-25P; the Carretera Central continues toward San Juan |
| San Juan | San Juan Antiguo | 0.0 | 0.0 | PR-Calle Tanca – Old San Juan | Northern terminus of PR-1 |
1.000 mi = 1.609 km; 1.000 km = 0.621 mi: Concurrency terminus; Incomplete access

== See also ==
- List of highways in Ponce, Puerto Rico
- List of streets in Ponce, Puerto Rico
