= Bairoa River =

River of Puerto Rico

Coordinates: 18.2643982°N 66.0146095°W

Location
- Commonwealth: Puerto Rico
- Municipality: Aguas Buenas, Caguas

Physical characteristics
- Source
  - location: Mula, Aguas Buenas
  - elevation: 161 ft
- Mouth
  - location: Bairoa, Caguas

The Bairoa River (Spanish: Río Bairoa) is a river of Caguas, Puerto Rico.

== Geography ==
The Bairoa River is one of the two main streams that traverse the Caguas Valley from west to east (the other being the Cagüitas River), both of which emptying into the Loíza River.

== Bairoa River Protected Natural Area ==
The Bairoa River Protected Natural Area (Spanish: Área natural protegida del Río Bairoa), located in Bairoa, Caguas, is a forested section of the Bairoa River designated a natural protected area since 2016 by the Puerto Rico Conservation Trust (Para la Naturaleza). The 584-acre protected area runs along the river and it constitutes an important secondary forest tract and hydrological drainage ecosystem for the Loíza River. The area is also an important habitat for the Puerto Rican plain pigeon (Patagioenas inornata wetmorei).

== See also ==
- List of rivers of Puerto Rico
- Protected areas of Puerto Rico
