= Puente No. 6 =

Historic bridge in Caguas, Puerto Rico

- Puente No. 6, Caguas, Puerto Rico
- U.S. National Register of Historic Places
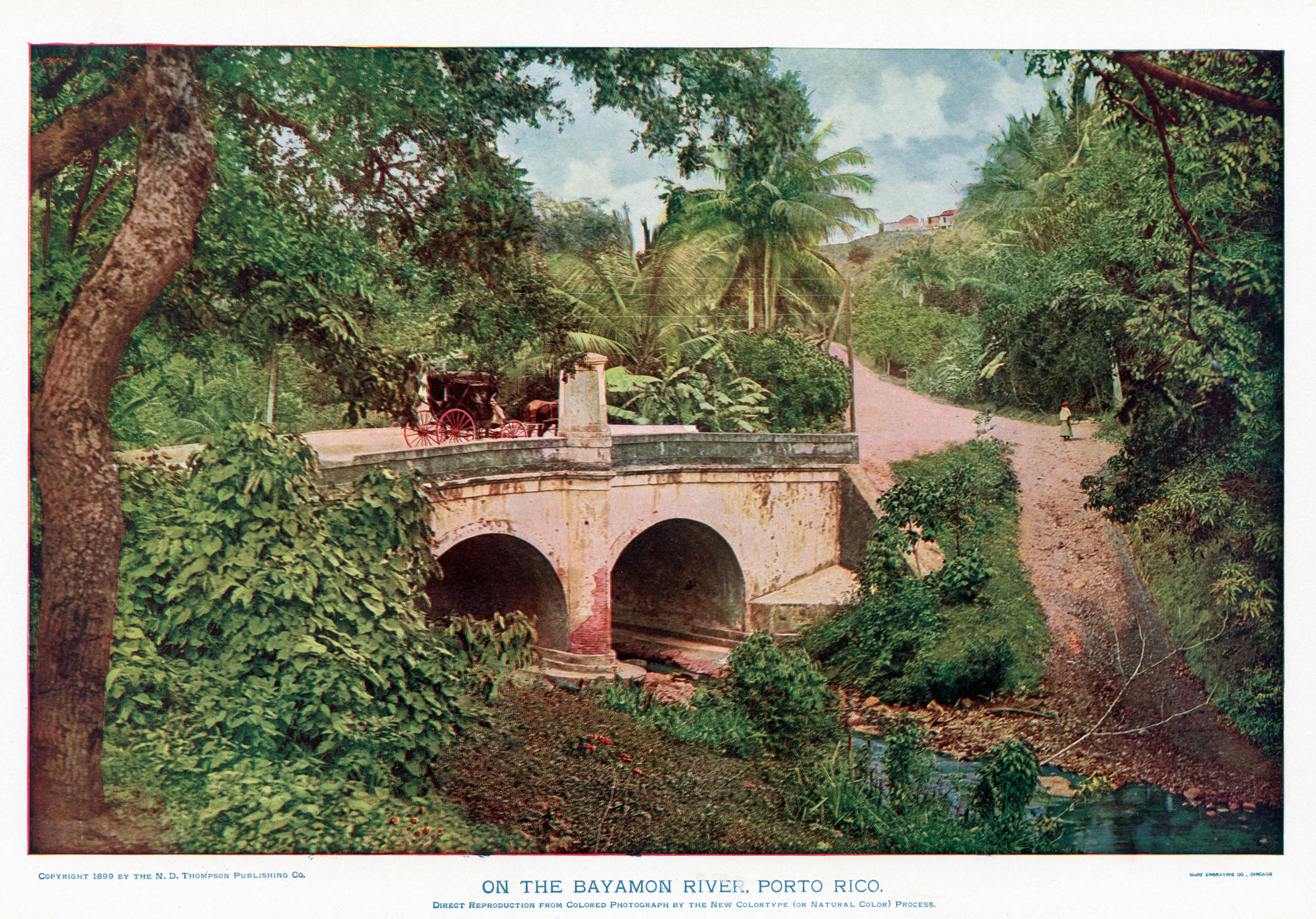
- 1899 lithograph of Puente No. 6

- Location within Puerto Rico
- Nearest city: Caguas, Puerto Rico
- Coordinates: 18°17′09″N 66°02′35″W
- Area: less than one acre
- Built: 1856
- Architectural style: Brick Barrel Vault
- MPS: Historic Bridges of Puerto Rico MPS
- NRHP reference No.: 09000361
- Added to NRHP: May 28, 2009

Puente No. 6, in Caguas, Puerto Rico is a historic bridge which was built in 1856. It was listed on the National Register of Historic Places in 2009 and is located at Puerto Rico Highway 798, Km. 1.0 in Río Cañas barrio.

It has also been known as Bridge #6, as Ponton La Concepcion, and as (La) Concepcion Bridge. It spans the Cañas River. It is a brick barrel vault bridge. It was built as part of the Río Piedras-Caguas highway program.

The image at right is from Our Islands and their People by Jose de Olivares, published in 1899 after the Spanish-American War.
