= Quebrada Arenas, San Juan, Puerto Rico =

Barrio of Puerto Rico

Quebrada Arenas
- Barrio
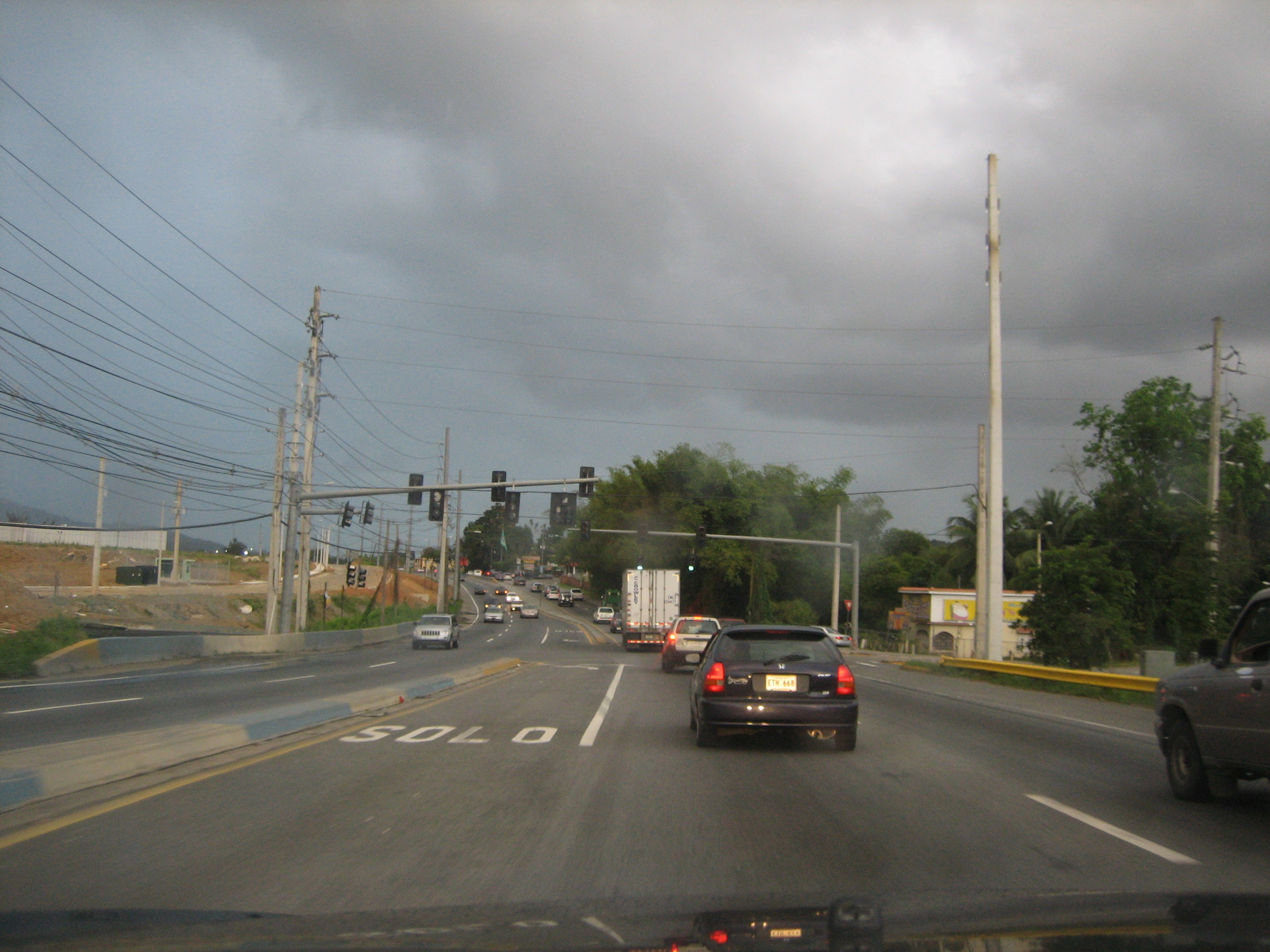
- Puerto Rico Highway 1 in Quebrada Arenas

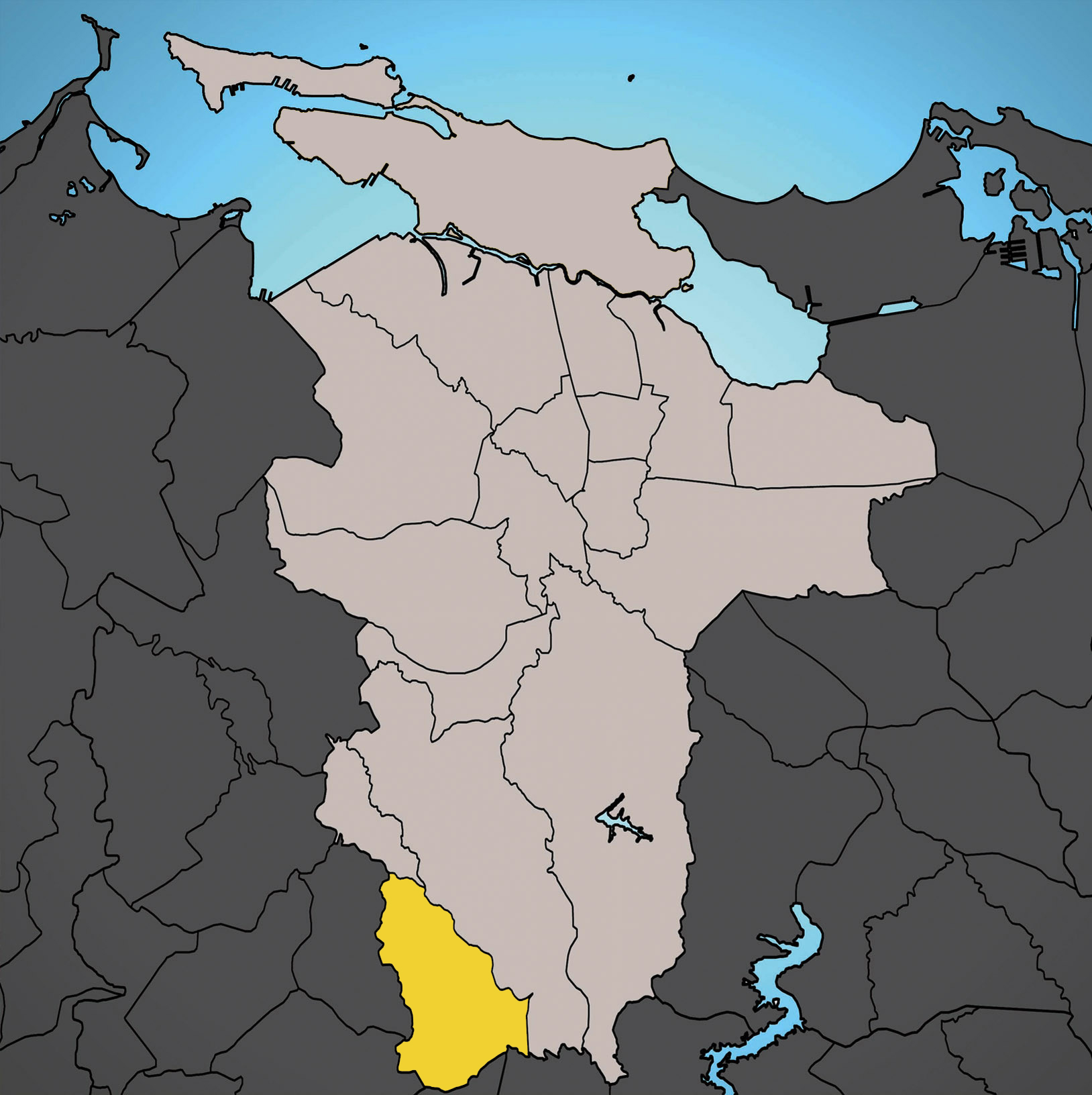
- Location of Quebrada Arenas shown in yellow.
- Coordinates: 18°19′13″N 66°04′52″W
- Commonwealth: Puerto Rico
- Municipality: San Juan

Area
  - Total: 2.46 sq mi (6.4 km^{2})
  - Land: 2.46 sq mi (6.4 km^{2})
  - Water: 0 sq mi (0 km^{2})
- Elevation: 446 ft (136 m)

Population (2010)
  - Total: 2,747
  - Density: 1,116.7/sq mi (431.2/km^{2})
- 2010 census
- Time zone: UTC−4 (AST)

Quebrada Arenas (Spanish for sandy creek) is one of the 18 barrios of the municipality of San Juan, Puerto Rico. Located in the southwest corner of San Juan, it is the only rural barrio in the municipality. Quebrada Arenas is totally outside San Juan's municipal urban zone according to the last census. In 2010 it had a population of 2,747 and a land area of 2.46 square miles (6.4 km^{2}), resulting in a population density of 1,116.7 residents per square mile (431.2 km^{2}), the lowest of any barrio in San Juan.

Quebrada Arenas has boundaries with the municipalities of Aguas Buenas and Caguas to the south, and Guaynabo to the west, and is bounded by Caimito barrios to the east and Tortugo barrio to the north.

== Demographics ==
Historical population
Census	Pop.	Note	%±
1900	716		—
1930	1,009		—
1940	1,316		30.4%
1950	1,261		−4.2%
1960	1,242		−1.5%
1970	1,832		47.5%
1980	1,590		−13.2%
1990	2,762		73.7%
2000	2,753		−0.3%
2010	2,747		−0.2%
U.S. Decennial Census; 1899 (shown as 1900) 1910-1930; 1930-1950 1980-2000 2010

== See also ==
- List of communities in Puerto Rico
