= Caimito, San Juan, Puerto Rico =

Barrio of San Juan, Puerto Rico

Caimito
- Barrio
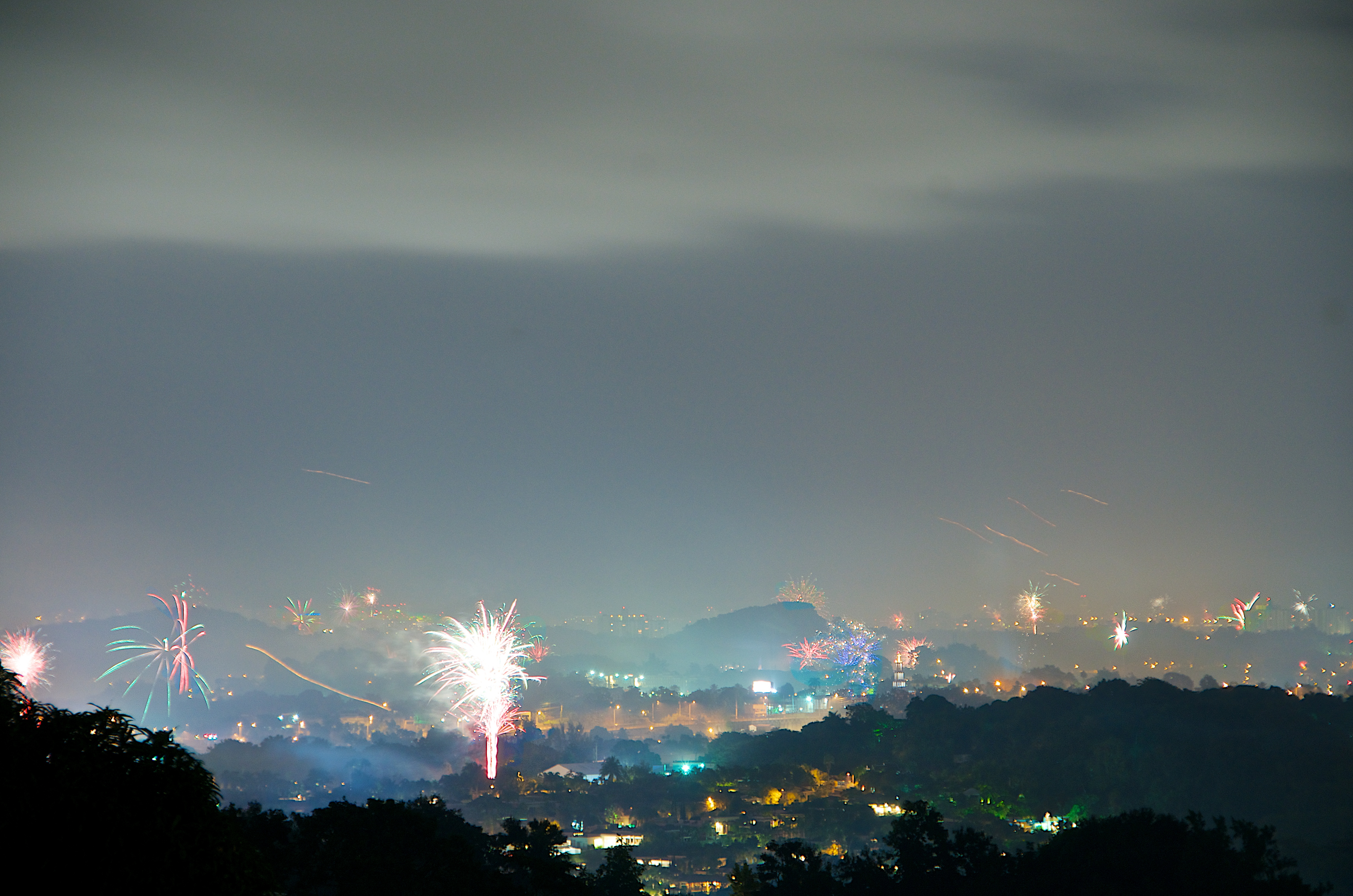
- Fireworks in Caimito on New Year's Eve 2014

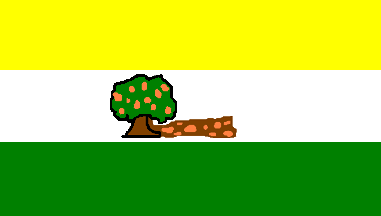
- Flag

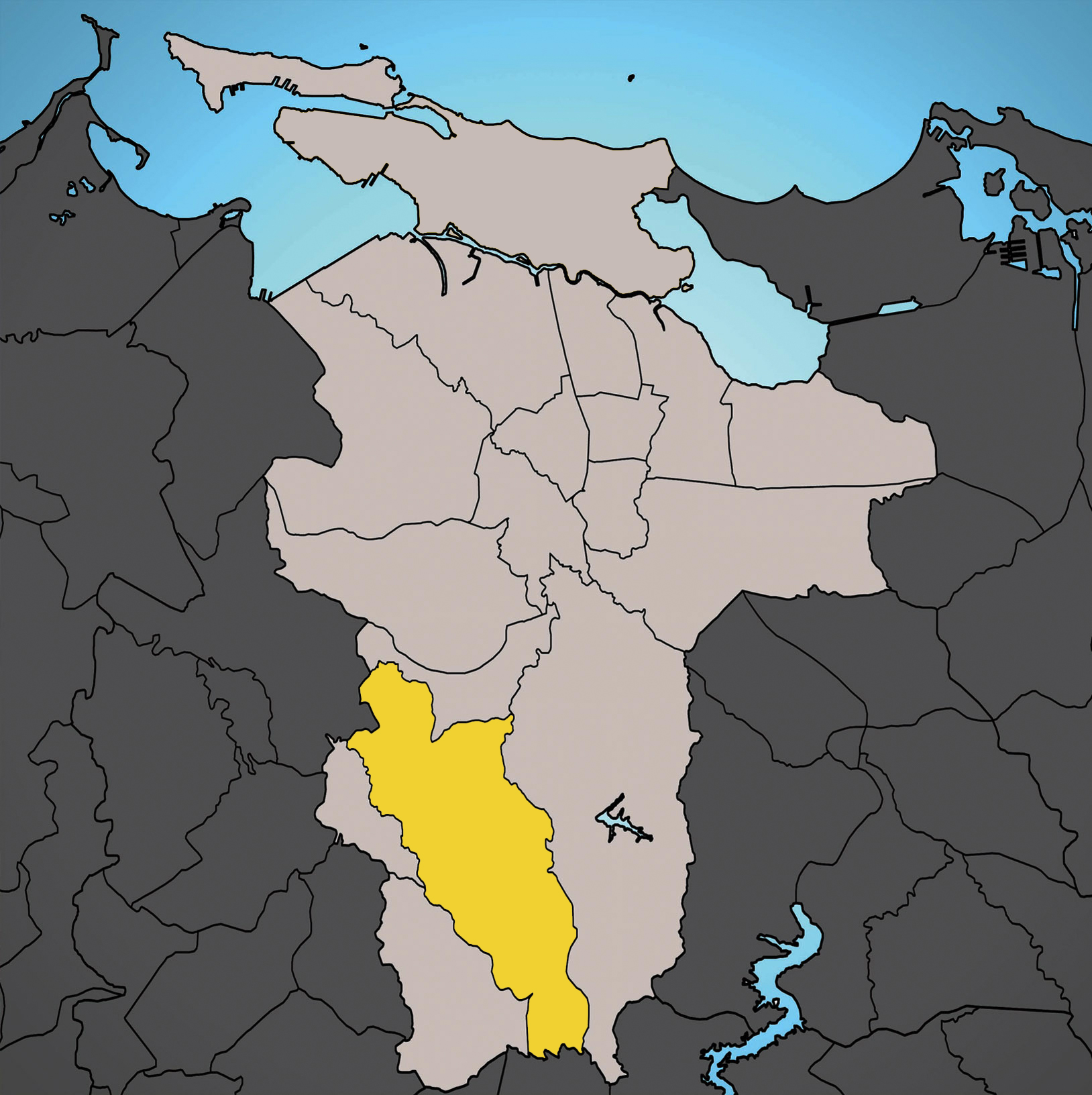
- Location of Caimito shown in yellow.
- Coordinates: 18°19′59″N 66°04′22″W
- Commonwealth: Puerto Rico
- Municipality: San Juan

Area
  - Total: 5.41 sq mi (14.0 km^{2})
  - Land: 5.41 sq mi (14.0 km^{2})
  - Water: 0 sq mi (0 km^{2})
- Elevation: 322 ft (98 m)

Population (2020)
  - Total: 19,547
  - Density: 3,610/sq mi (1,400/km^{2})
- 2020 census
- Time zone: UTC−4 (AST)

Caimito is one of the 18 barrios of the municipality of San Juan, Puerto Rico located in the mountainous part of the municipality. With a land area of 5.41 square miles (14.0 km^{2}), Caimito is the second largest barrio in the municipality of San Juan, Puerto Rico. In 2020 it had 19,547 inhabitants and a population density of 4,034.2 per sq.mi. Located in the southern part of San Juan, Caimito is bordered by barrios Tortugo and Quebrada Arenas to the west, by Monacillo to the north, by Cupey to the east and by the municipality of Caguas to the south.

== History ==
The name Caimito comes from the Caimito tree, which is common in the region. The word caimito is possibly a Spanish adaptation (-ito being the Spanish diminutive) of the Taino word caima, possibly related to the Carib acayouman, meaning crocodile (see caiman).

Assigned as a suburb of Río Piedras in 1835 by Pedro Tomás de Córdova, who was Captain General of Puerto Rico from 1816 to 1836, Caimito consisted of 3,595.30 acres or land or roughly 5.16 square miles. Caimito comprises the former barrios of Caimito Alto and Caimito Bajo, which were last documented in the 1899 census. Caimito was part of Rio Piedras until 1951 when it was merged as a barrio of the municipality of San Juan. Historian Dr. Fernando Picó S.J., wrote a book about the history and genealogy of the area, published in 1989, called Vivir en Caimito.

The neighborhood commissioner (comisario de barrio was the main representative of Caimito to the Mayor of Río Piedras. By the 19th century, they were the main local representatives of an absent state. Most of them were not originally from Caimito, but instead were people who had settled there, usually businessmen and farmers. This position was not compensated properly but they garnered some power and prestige.

=== List of comisarios de barrio in Caimito during the 19th century ===
| Name | Year |
|---|---|
| Vicente Viera | 1839 |
| Eusebio Noa | 1840 |
| Jose María Noa | 1842 |
| Ramón González | 1852 |
| Rafael Bigio | 1853 |
| Miguel Rodríguez | 1852 |
| Esteban Hernández | 1862 |
| Federico Pastrana | 1867 |
| Cecilio García | 1867 |
| Miguel Rodríguez | 1868 |
| José Perez | 1871 |
| Juan Noa | 1874 |
| Hilario Isaga | 1893 |

== Geography ==
Caimito is located in the mountainous area of San Juan. The municipality's highest point, an unnamed peak measuring almost 1,030 feet (314 m) above sea level, close to the municipal border with Caguas, is located in this barrio close to the Sendra Forest Park on the Morcelo sector. Some of the most important rivers in San Juan have their source in this area too, such as the Piedras River, which gives its name to Río Piedras and flows into the Puerto Nuevo River and the San Juan Bay.

The major routes that cross Caimito include the PR-199, PR-842 and PR-1.

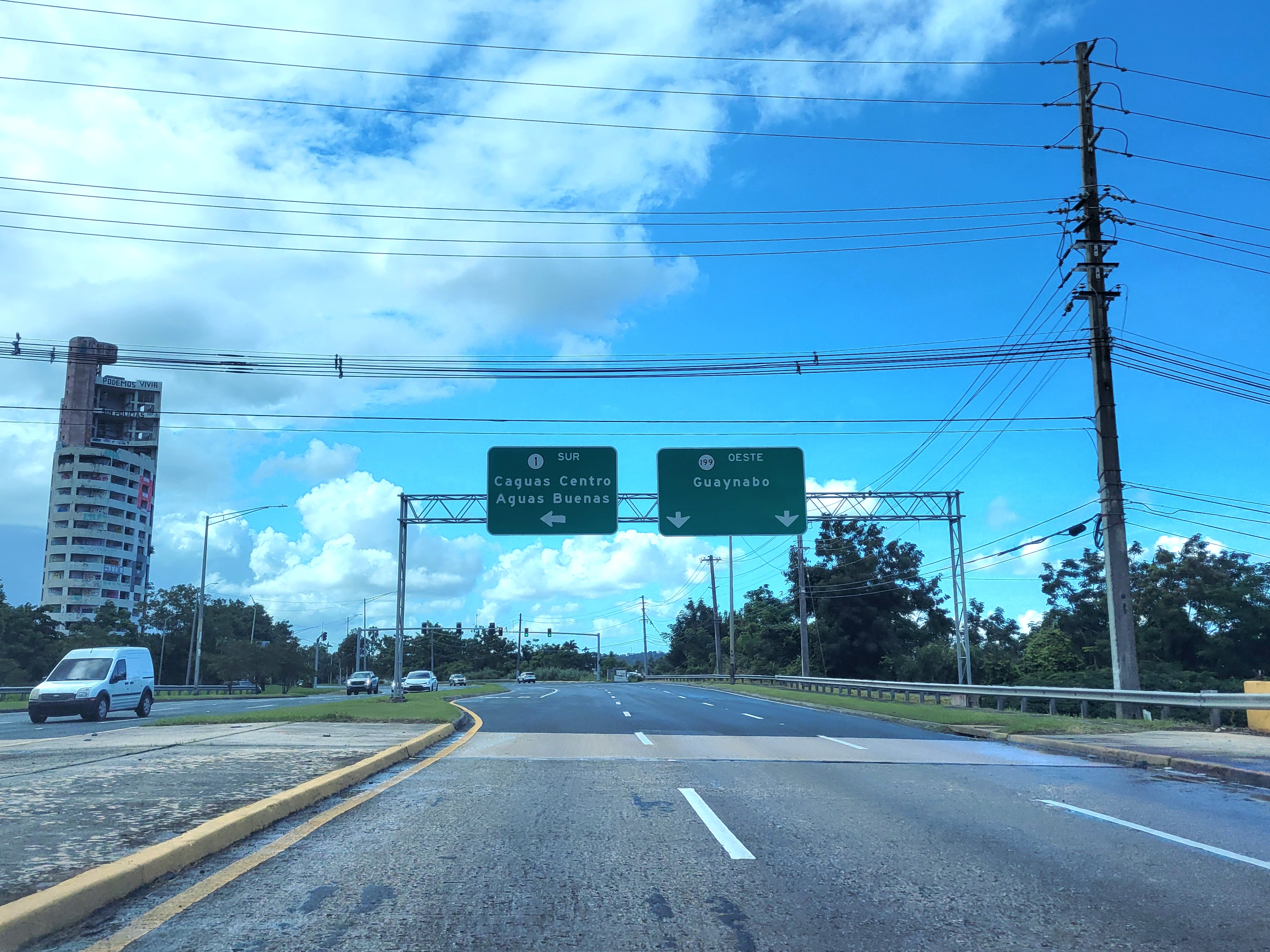
Puerto Rico Highway 199 in Caimito

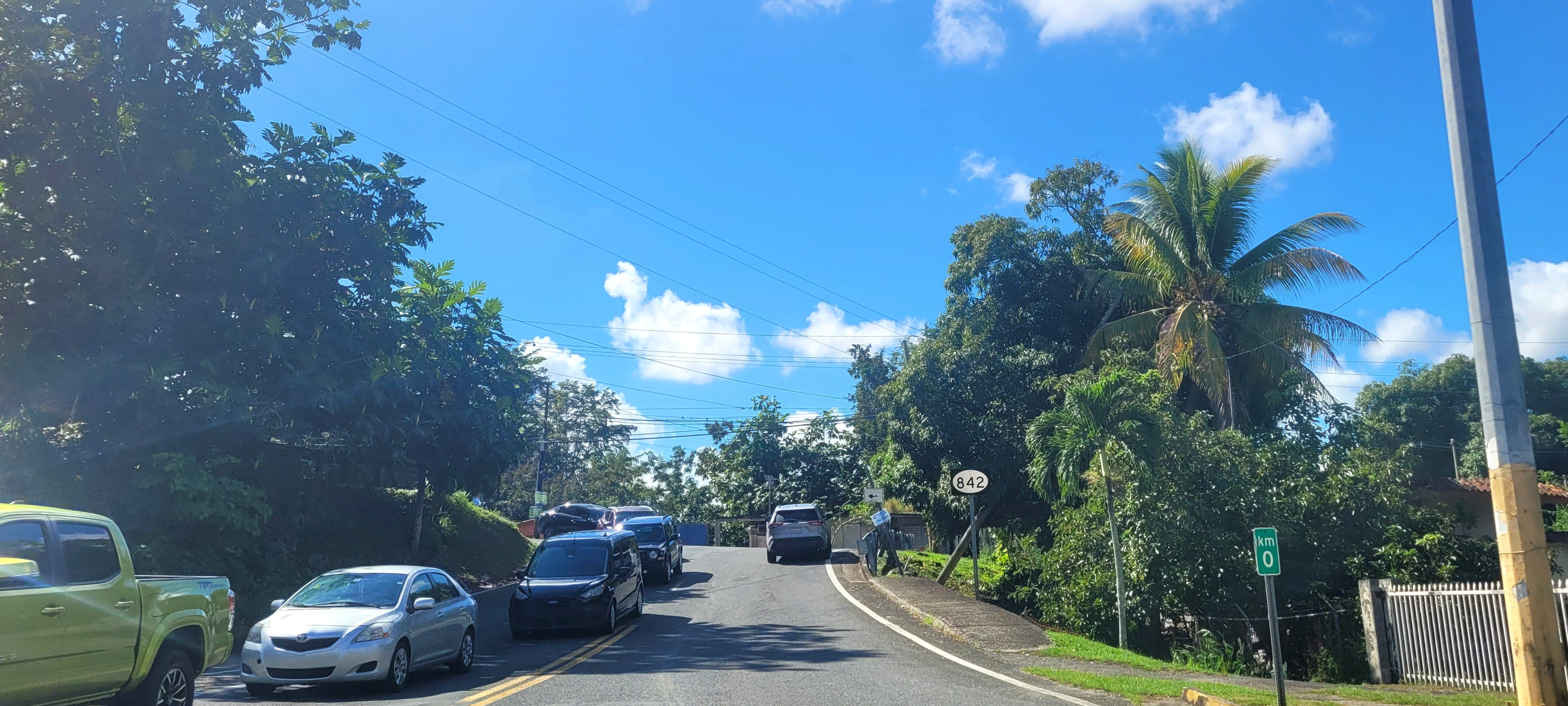
Puerto Rico Highway 842 in Caimito

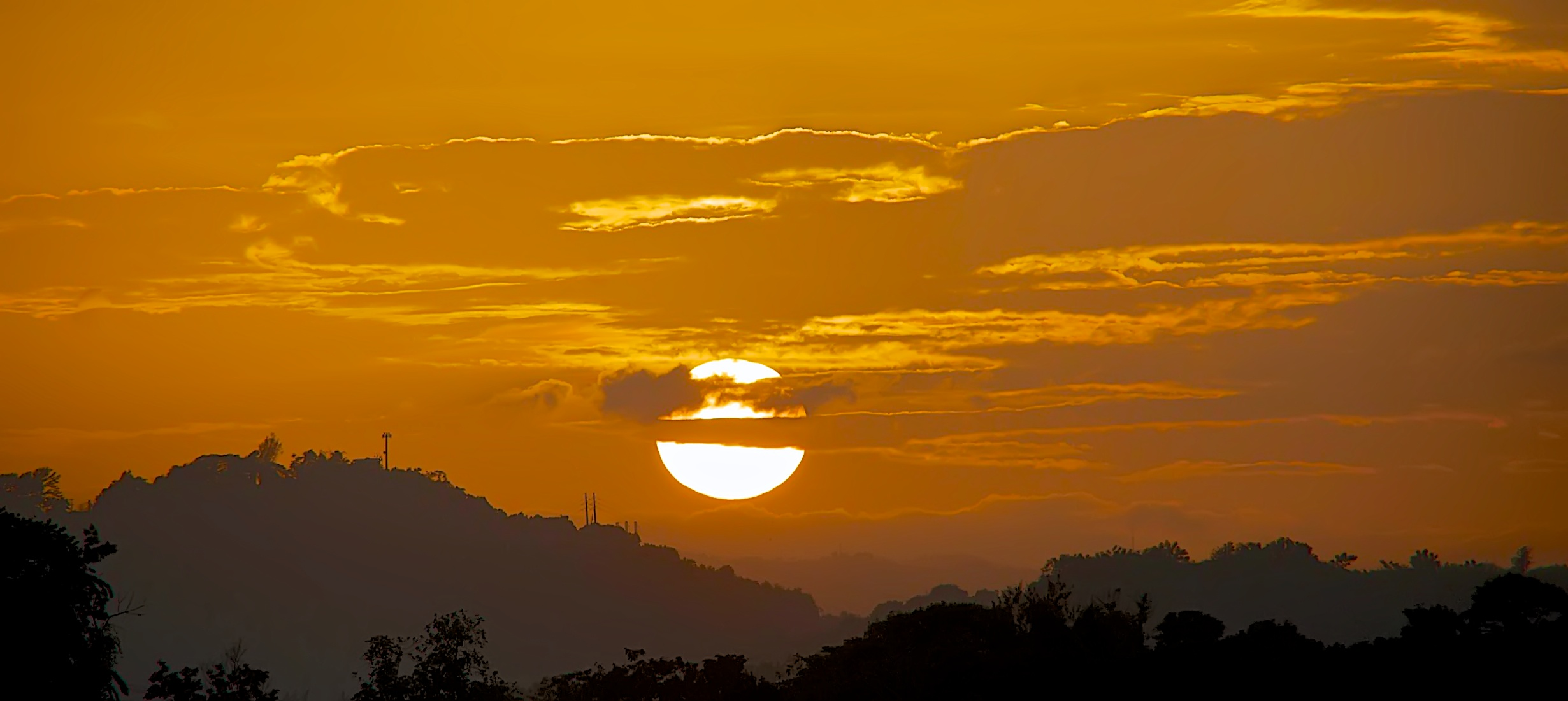
Sunset in Caimito (2014)

Caimito hills from Aguas Buenas.

== Demographics ==
Historical population
| Census | Pop. | Note | %± |
|---|---|---|---|
| 1900 | 1,706 | | — |
| 1910 | 1,934 | | 13.4% |
| 1920 | 2,329 | | 20.4% |
| 1930 | 2,884 | | 23.8% |
| 1940 | 3,115 | | 8.0% |
| 1950 | 4,588 | | 47.3% |
| 1960 | 6,987 | | 52.3% |
| 1970 | 13,268 | | 89.9% |
| 1980 | 15,939 | | 20.1% |
| 1990 | 19,413 | | 21.8% |
| 2000 | 20,832 | | 7.3% |
| 2010 | 21,825 | | 4.8% |
| 2020 | 19,547 | | −10.4% |
U.S. Decennial Census; 1899 (shown as 1900) 1910-1930; 1930-1950 1980-2000 2010 2020

The population of Caimito in 2020 was 19,547. Caimito is further divided into the following sectors and neighborhoods: Camino Dr. Colorado, La Cuchilla, Camino Los Ramos, Morcelo, Camino Sánchez Guzmán, Camino Pablo Sánchez, Camino Los Sánchez, Camino Francisco Escribano and Camino El Piloto.

== Landmarks and attractions ==
- The Outlets at Montehiedra, developed in 1994, is a one level enclosed mall with over 100 stores located within Caimito. Anchored by Home Depot, Marshalls and Capri, the Outlet also includes stores such as Nike, Old Navy and Gap. It includes a fourteen-screen theater by Caribbean Cinemas with IMAX, CXC and 4DX screens.
- Centro Zen de Puerto Rico (Puerto Rico Zen Center)
- Gimnasio Municipal de Caimito
- Centro Sor Isolina Ferré
- Iglesia Episcopal San José

== Notable people ==
- Eduardo Bonilla-Silva - Sociology professor at Duke University, president of the American Sociological Association.
- Félix Trinidad - Former professional boxer. Although born in Fajardo, Puerto Rico and raised in Cupey, "Tito" Trinidad is also often associated with Caimito, having been trained by Freddy Trinidad at the Gimnasio Municipal de Caimito.
- Rubén Berrios - President of the Puerto Rican Independence Party, professor at the University of Puerto Rico School of Law.

The noted boxing family, the Solis family, hails from Caimito.

- Enrique Solis- Boxer, fought for world title.
- Julian Solís- Boxer, world champion.
- Rafael Solis- Boxer, fought for world title.
- Santos Solis- a professional boxer.

== See also ==
- List of communities in Puerto Rico
