= Bairoa, Caguas, Puerto Rico =

Barrio of Puerto Rico

Bairoa
- Barrio
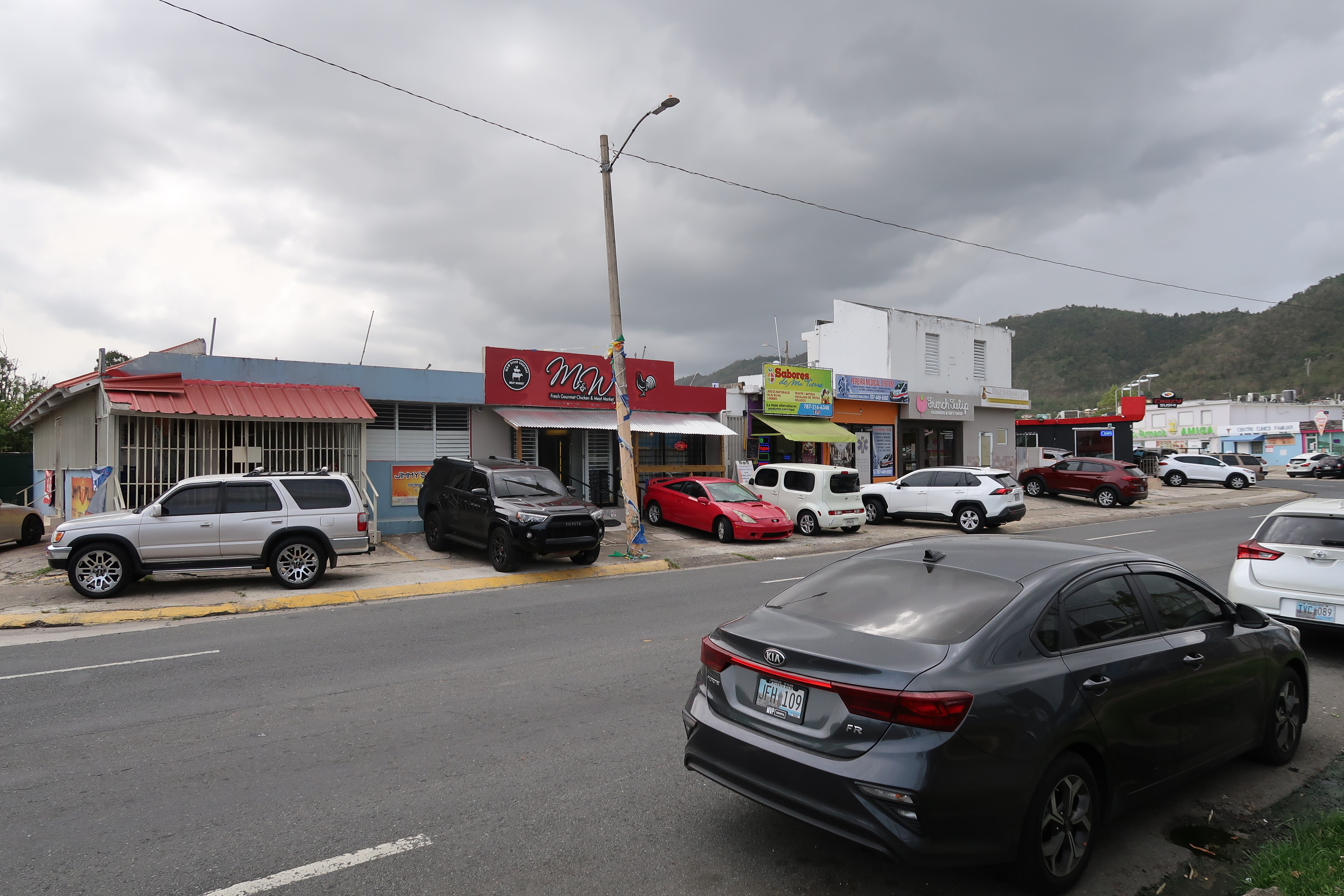
- Street and shops in Bairoa

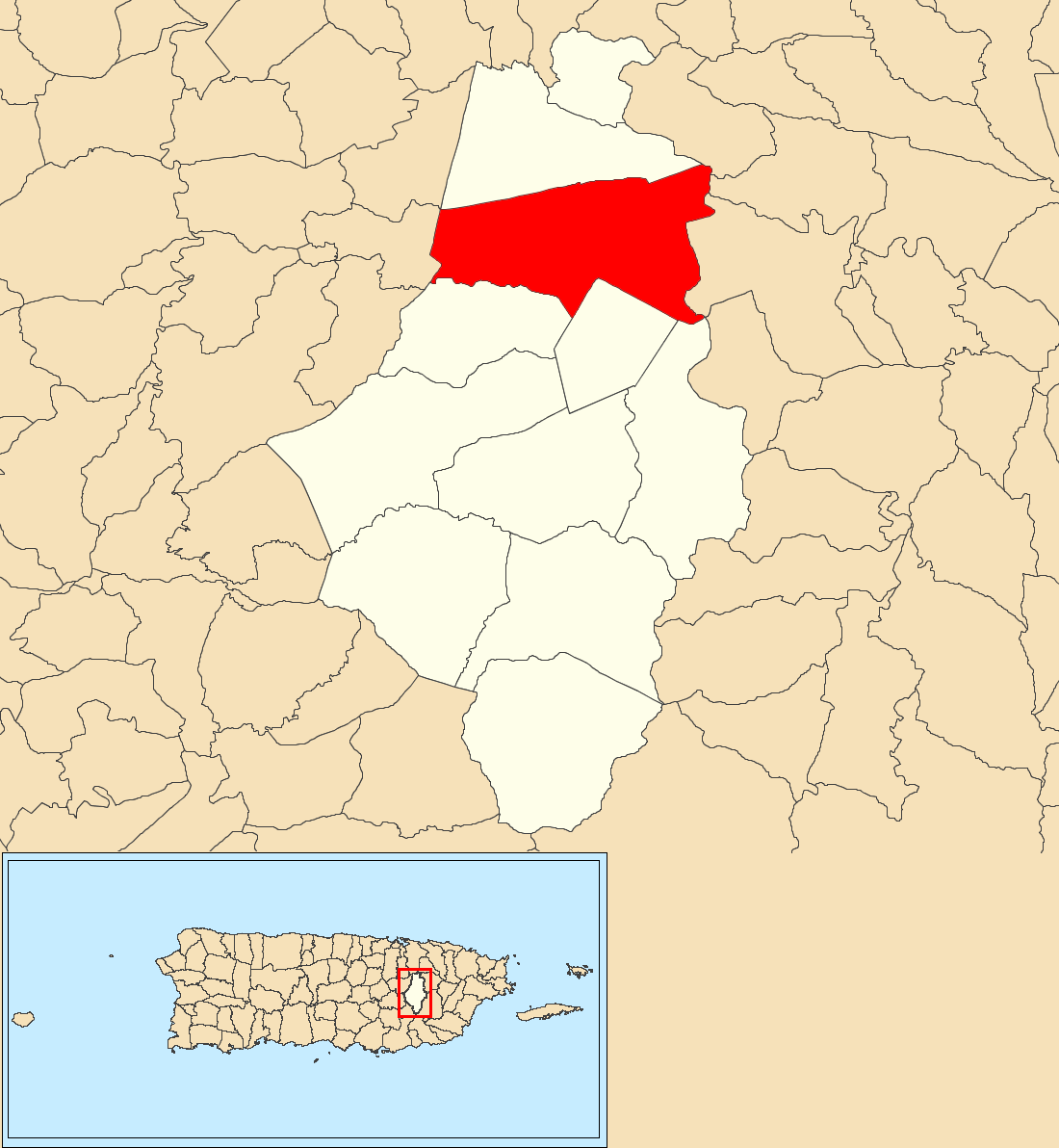
- Location of Bairoa within the municipality of Caguas shown in red

- Location of Puerto Rico
- Coordinates: 18°15′35″N 66°02′25″W
- Commonwealth: Puerto Rico
- Municipality: Caguas

Area
  - Total: 7.67 sq mi (19.9 km^{2})
  - Land: 7.56 sq mi (19.6 km^{2})
  - Water: 0.11 sq mi (0.28 km^{2})
- Elevation: 194 ft (59 m)

Population (2020)
  - Total: 18,197
  - Density: 2,410/sq mi (929/km^{2})
- Source: 2020 Census
- Time zone: UTC−4 (AST)
- ZIP Code: 00725, 00726, 00727
- Area codes: 787, 939

Bairoa is a barrio or district in the municipality of Caguas, Puerto Rico. Its population in 2020 was 18,197. There are close to 60 sectors in Bairoa.

== Name ==
The barrio of Bairoa gets its name from the Bairoa River which crosses the area from west to east and flows into the Loíza River. There are numerous theories about the name meaning of Bairoa. The word bairoa is most likely of Taíno origin and it possibly comes from the word baira, which is either the native name for the tree Chrysophyllum cainito, or a native word meaning "forest", "wood" or "tree bark", or from the word paira meaning "bow".

== Sectors and demographics ==
Barrios (which are, in contemporary times, roughly comparable to minor civil divisions) in turn are further subdivided into smaller local populated place areas/units called sectores (sectors in English). The types of sectores may vary, from normally sector to urbanización to reparto to barriada to residencial, among others.

The following sectors are in Bairoa: Alto Monte, Altos de San Luis, Antigua Vía, Apartamentos Los Pinos, Arbolada, Bairoa I, Bairoa II, Bairoa La 25, Bairoa Park Bairoa, Caguas Milenio I, Caguas Milenio II, Chalets de Bairoa, Ciudad Jardín, Ciudad Jardín - La Cima, Colinas de Bairoa, Diamond Village, El Retiro, Estancias de Bairoa, Estancias de Santa Teresa Bairoa, Estancias del Turabo, Golden Gate I, Golden Gate II, Jardines de Condado Moderno, La Serranía, La Serranía - Lomas de La Serranía, La Serranía - Rincón de La Serranía, Las Carolinas, Las Carolinas - Urbanización Las Carolinas, Los Cajones, Los Curas, Los Reyes, Mansiones de Bairoa, Mirador de Bairoa, Monte Altos de San Luis, Monticelo, La 25, Santa Juana Apartments, Santa Juana I y II, Santa Juana III, Santa Juana IV, Valle Verde Bairoa, Valley View Park, Villa Blanca Apartments, and Wind Gate.

Historical population
Census	Pop.	Note	%±
1910	2,994		—
1920	2,873		−4.0%
1930	3,809		32.6%
1940	3,866		1.5%
1950	2,432		−37.1%
1960	3,420		40.6%
1970	0		−100.0%
1980	14,562		—
1990	18,189		24.9%
2000	19,201		5.6%
2010	19,258		0.3%
2020	18,197		−5.5%
U.S. Decennial Census; 1900 (N/A) 1910-1930; 1930-1950 1980-2000 2010 2020

== History ==
The area of Bairoa was originally inhabited by the Taíno people. At the time of the Spanish arrival the area was under control of cacique (tribal chief) Caguax, from whom the city of Caguas gets its name. The first European settlement in the area was the Hato de Bairoa, a cattle farm established and developed between the years 1525 and 1600. The first mention of Bairoa as a district of Caguas comes from the colonial municipal budget documents of 1821 as Bairoa Abajo and Bairoa Arriba (modern day Bairoa, Aguas Buenas). During this time the economy of the barrio was primarily the cultivation of sugarcane and minor fruits, and cattle raising.

Bairoa was in Spain's gazetteers until Puerto Rico was ceded by Spain in the aftermath of the Spanish–American War under the terms of the Treaty of Paris of 1898 and became an unincorporated territory of the United States. In 1899, the United States Department of War conducted a census of Puerto Rico finding that the combined population of Borinquen barrio and Bairoa barrio was 3,870. According to the 2010 United States census the population of Bairoa is of 19,258 residents, and the barrio today is primarily suburban and residential.

== Notable sites ==
- Altos de San Luis, mountain ridge
- Bairoa Forest, secondary forest between the Valle Verde and Golden Gates neighborhoods.

== Gallery ==
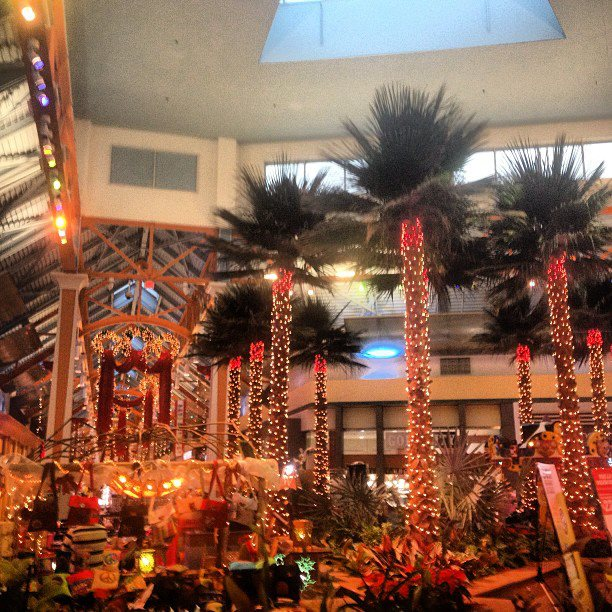
Plaza Centro, Christmas 2012.

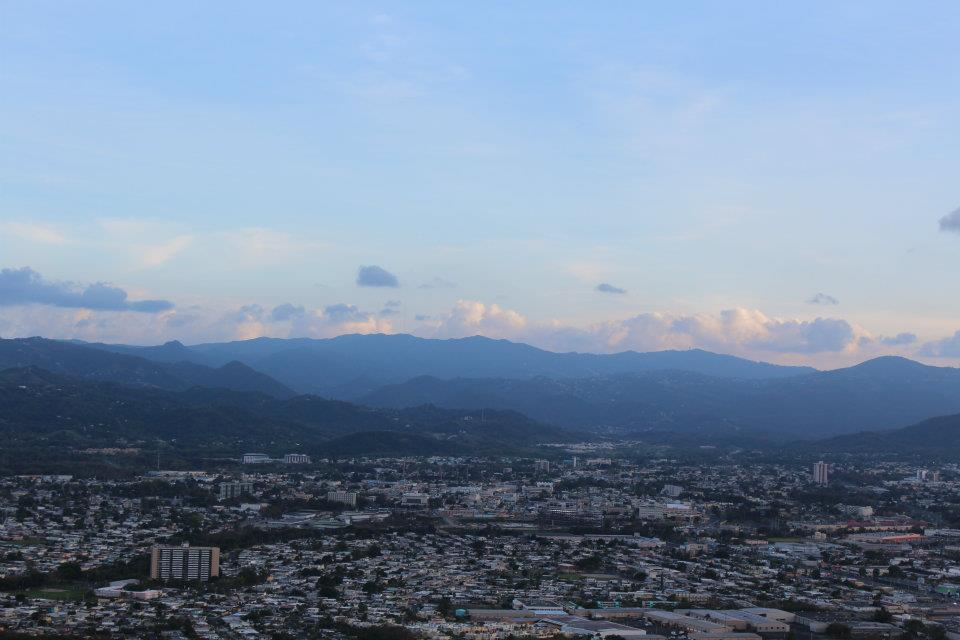
View of Caguas and Bairoa (in the foreground) from Altos de San Luis.

== See also ==
- Bairoa, Aguas Buenas
- List of communities in Puerto Rico
