= Río Cañas, Caguas, Puerto Rico =

Barrio of Puerto Rico

Río Cañas
- Barrio
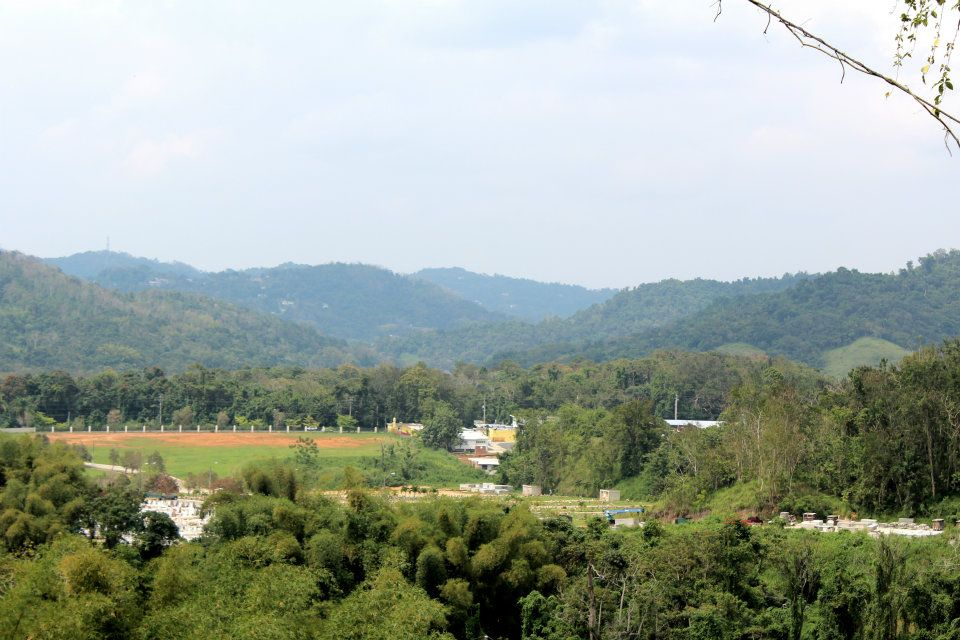
- Mountains in Río Cañas

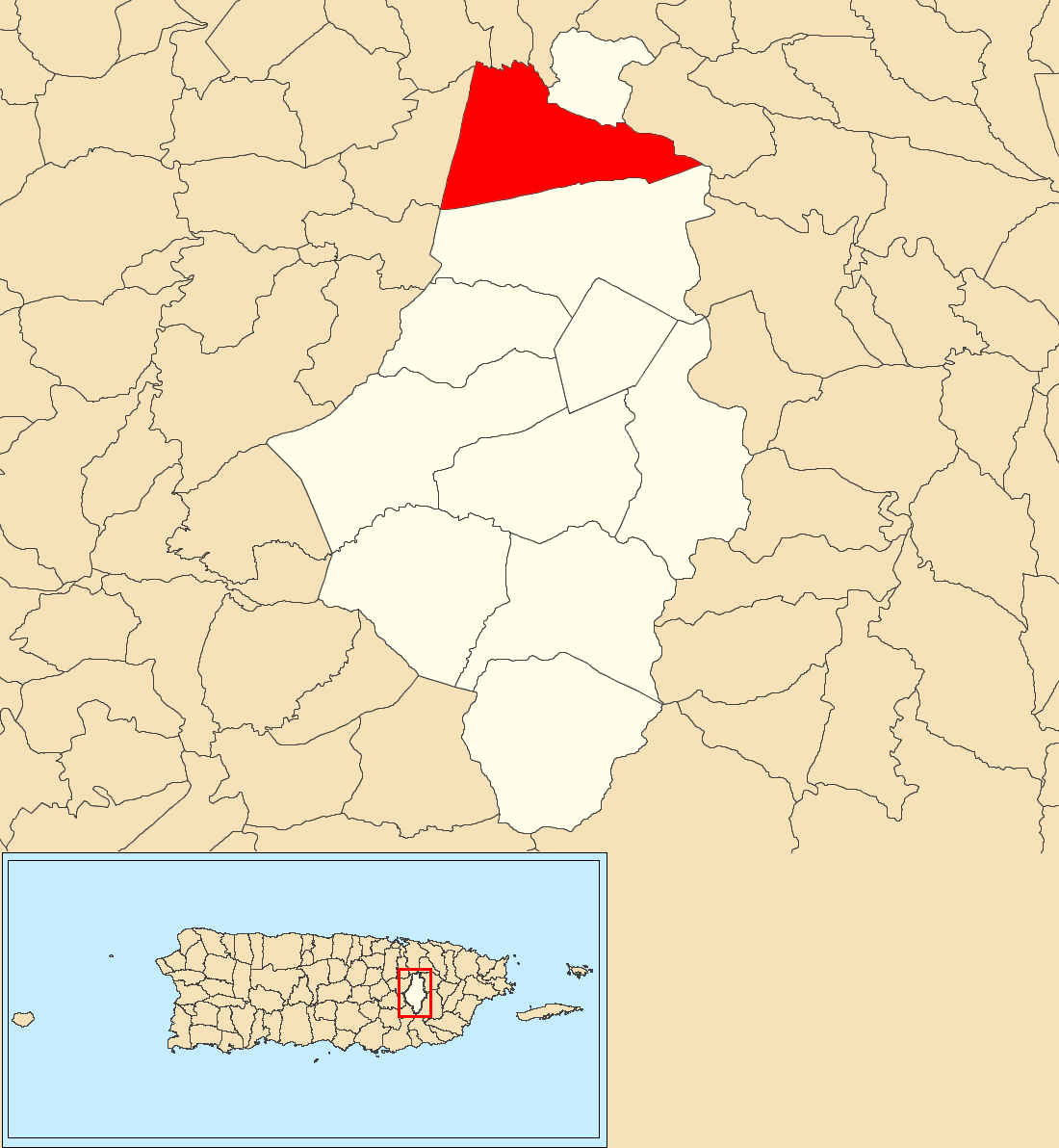
- Location of Río Cañas within the municipality of Caguas shown in red

- Location of Puerto Rico
- Coordinates: 18°17′01″N 66°02′57″W
- Commonwealth: Puerto Rico
- Municipality: Caguas

Area
  - Total: 5.33 sq mi (13.8 km^{2})
  - Land: 5.25 sq mi (13.6 km^{2})
  - Water: 0.08 sq mi (0.21 km^{2})
- Elevation: 387 ft (118 m)

Population (2010)
  - Total: 9,683
  - Density: 1,844.4/sq mi (712.1/km^{2})
- Source: 2010 Census
- Time zone: UTC−4 (AST)
- ZIP Code: 00725, 00726, 00727
- Area codes: 787, 939

Río Cañas is a barrio in the municipality of Caguas, Puerto Rico. Its population in 2010 was 9,683.

== History ==
Río Cañas was in Spain's gazetteers until Puerto Rico was ceded by Spain in the aftermath of the Spanish–American War under the terms of the Treaty of Paris of 1898 and became an unincorporated territory of the United States. In 1899, the United States Department of War conducted a census of Puerto Rico finding that the population of Río Cañas barrio was 1,336.

Historical population
Census	Pop.	Note	%±
1900	1,336		—
1910	1,299		−2.8%
1920	2,508		93.1%
1930	2,409		−3.9%
1940	2,739		13.7%
1950	3,975		45.1%
1960	4,767		19.9%
1970	6,250		31.1%
1980	6,289		0.6%
1990	8,416		33.8%
2000	10,982		30.5%
2010	9,683		−11.8%
U.S. Decennial Census; 1899 (shown as 1900) 1910-1930; 1930-1950 1980-2000 2010

== Notable residents ==
- Tavín Pumarejo - actor and singer
- Dean Zayas - actor, playwright and professor

== Gallery ==
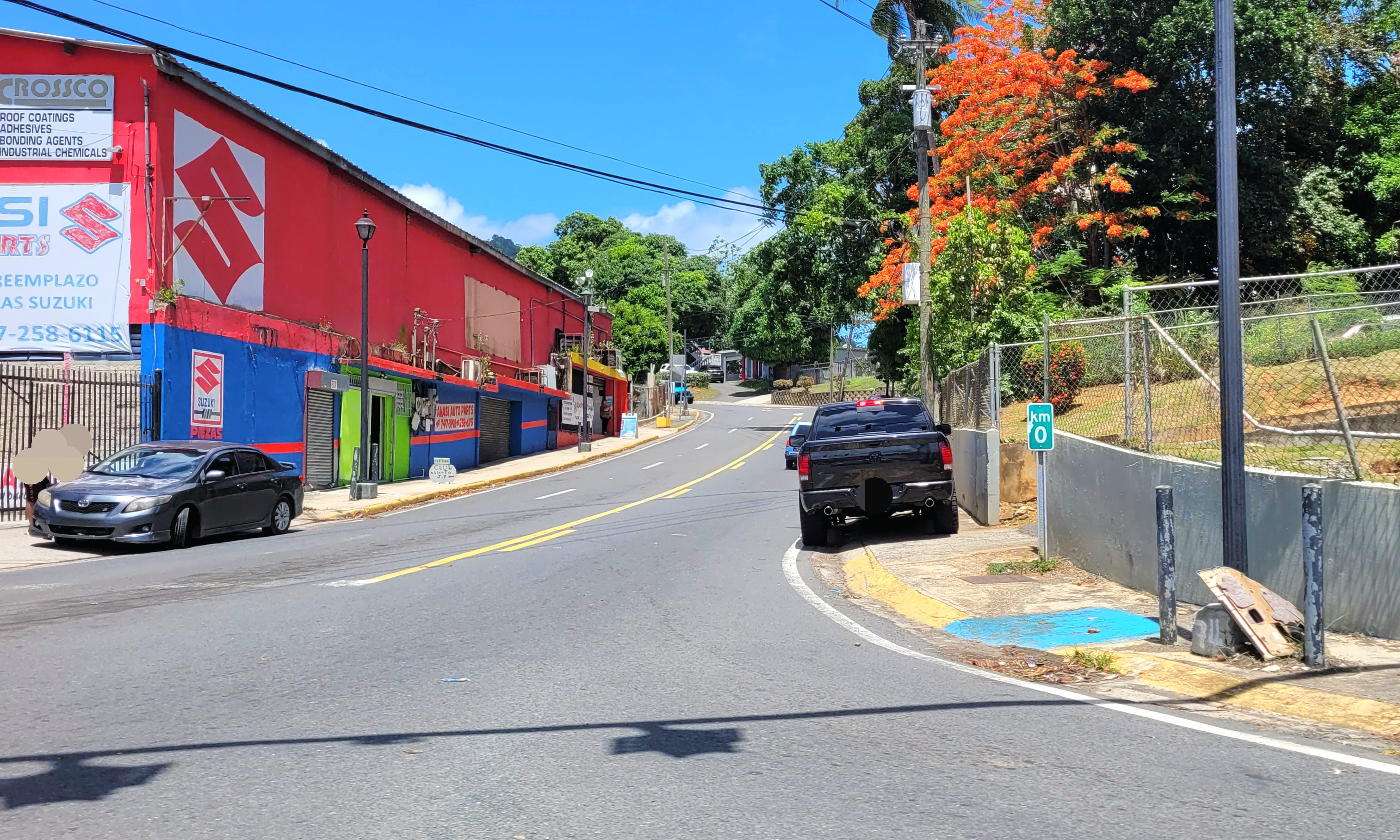
Puerto Rico Highway 795 in Río Cañas

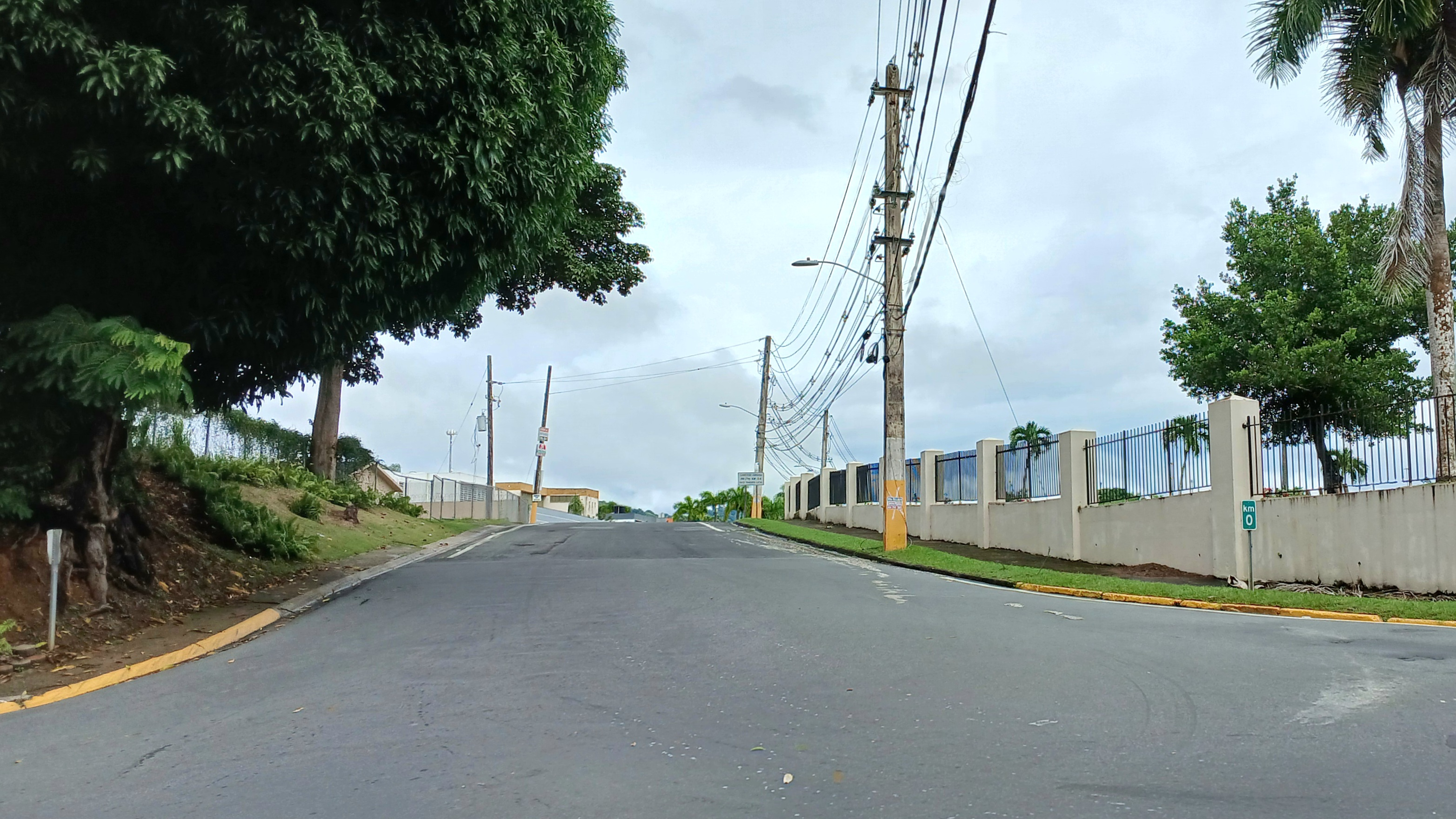
Puerto Rico Highway 796 in Río Cañas

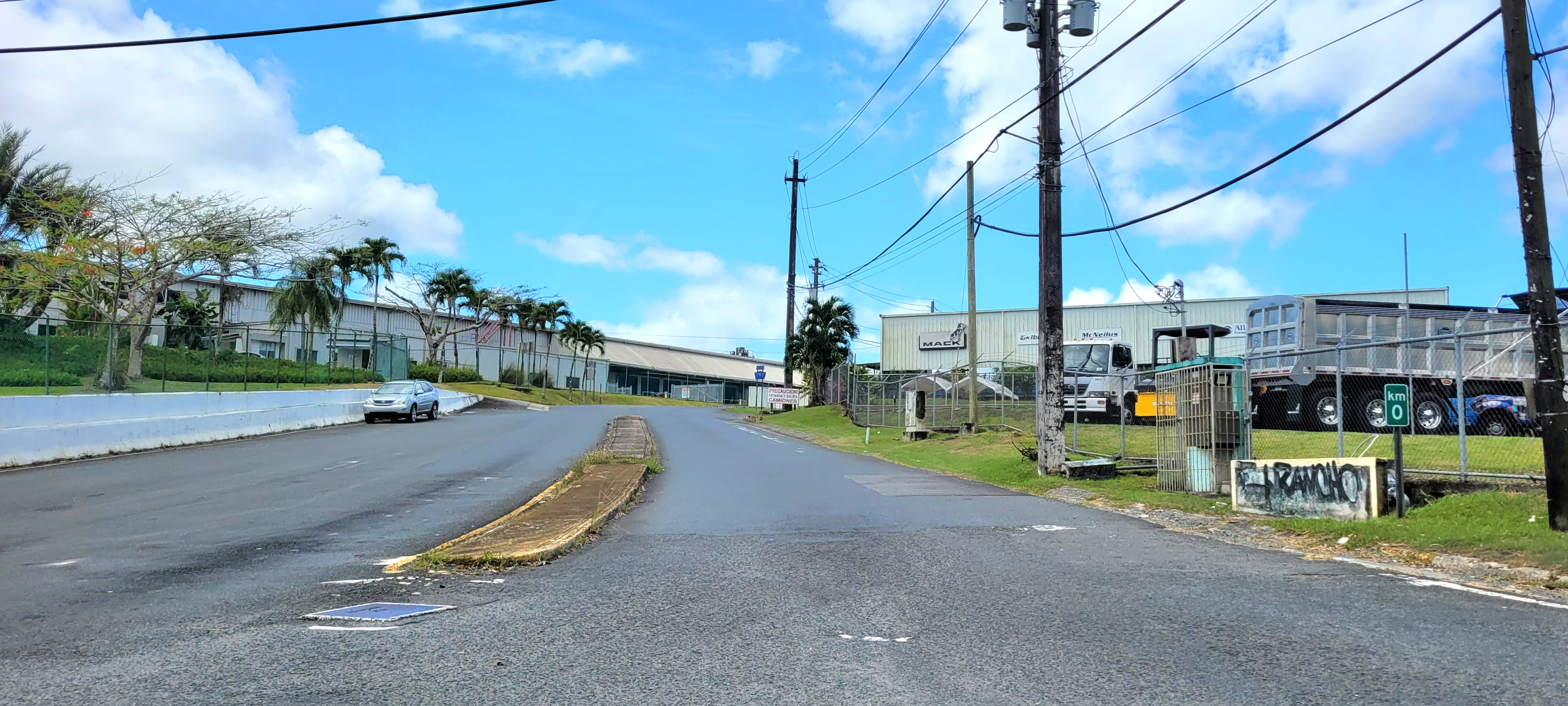
Puerto Rico Highway 797 in Río Cañas

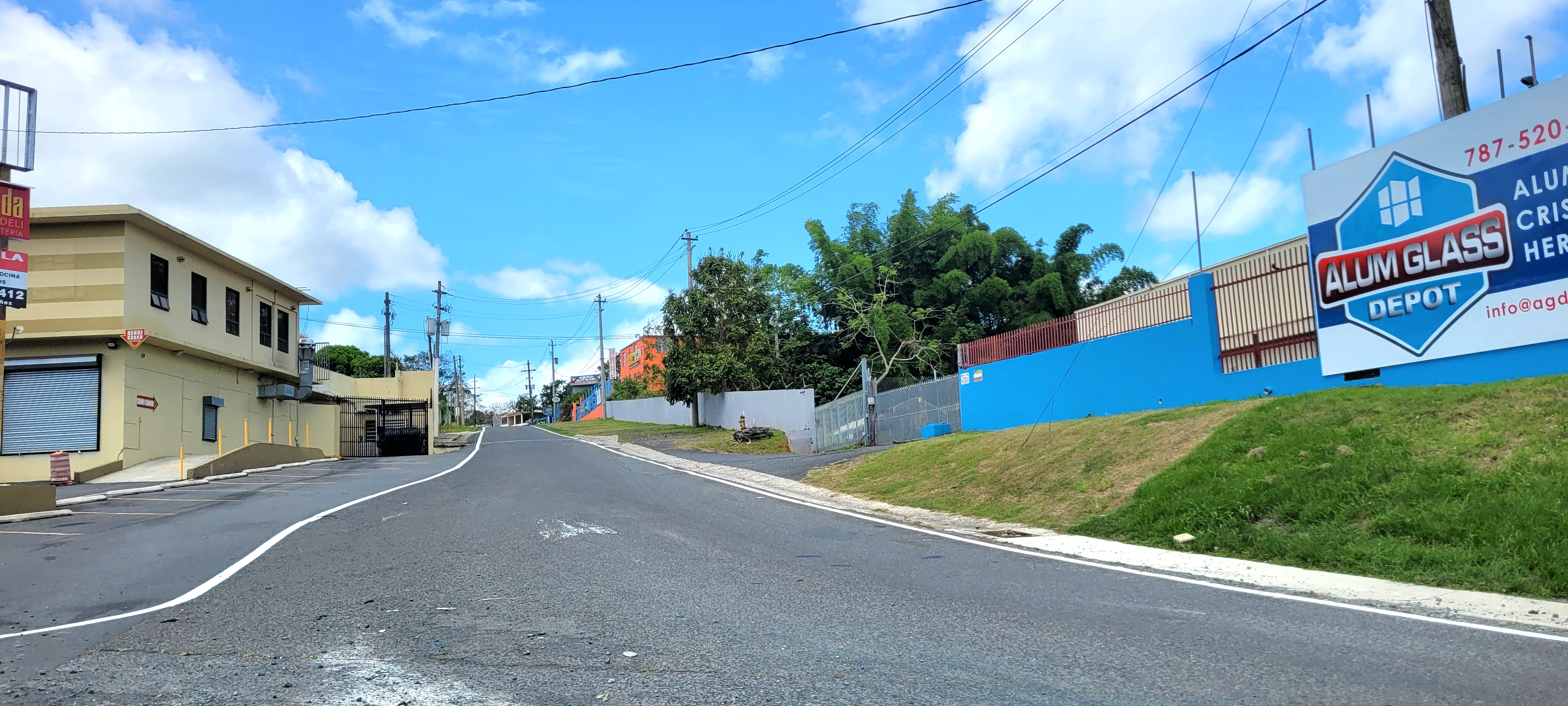
Puerto Rico Highway 798 in Río Cañas

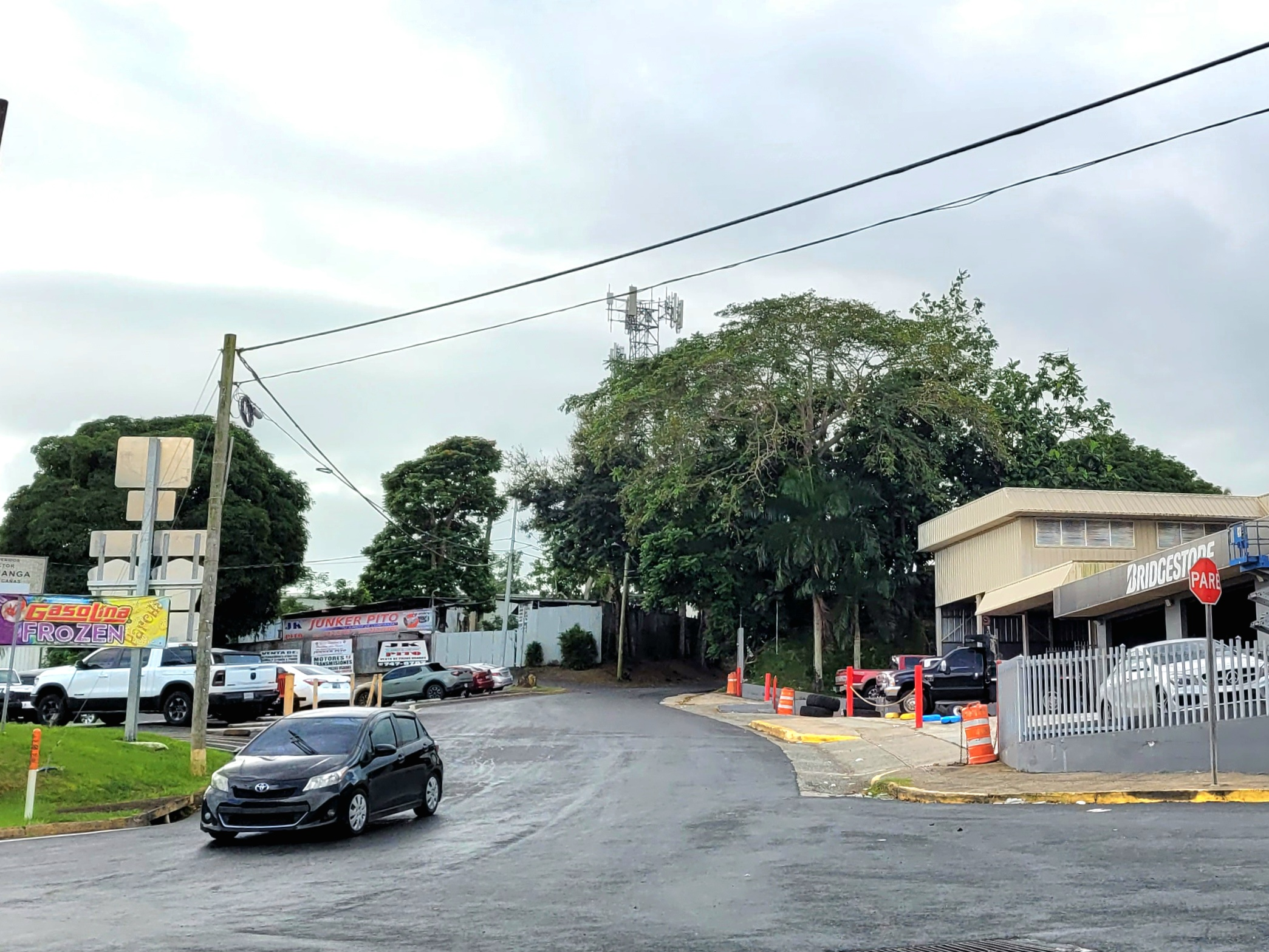
Puerto Rico Highway 799 in Río Cañas

== See also ==
- List of communities in Puerto Rico
