= Puerto Rico Highway 208 =

Highway in Puerto Rico

Highway 208
- Ruta 208
- Desvío Norte de Aguas Buenas

Route information
- Maintained by Puerto Rico DTPW

Major junctions
- West end: PR-156 in Sumidero–Mula
- PR-174 in Mula–Sonadora; PR-173 in Bairoa
- East end: PR-156 in Bairoa

Location
- Country: United States
- Territory: Puerto Rico
- Municipalities: Aguas Buenas

Highway system
- Roads in Puerto Rico; List
← PR-206	→ PR-212

Puerto Rico Highway 208 (PR-208) is a proposed bypass to be located north of downtown Aguas Buenas in Puerto Rico. When completed, it will extend from PR-156 west of downtown to return to PR-156 in the east of the municipality center.

== Route description ==
The proposed route will run north of the urban center of Aguas Buenas, facilitating traffic in the area. PR-208 will extend from PR-156 on the Sumidero–Mula line to PR-156 in Bairoa barrio. On its way, it will meet PR-174 on the Mula–Sonadora line and PR-173 in Bairoa barrio.

== Major intersections ==
The entire route is located in Aguas Buenas.

Location	km	mi	Destinations	Notes
Sumidero–Mula line			PR-156	Western terminus of PR-208; access to Comerío and Cidra
Mula–Sonadora line			PR-174	Access to Bayamón
Bairoa			PR-173	Access to Guaynabo
Bairoa			PR-156	Eastern terminus of PR-208; access to Caguas
1.000 mi = 1.609 km; 1.000 km = 0.621 mi: Unopened
