= Puerto Rico Highway 173 =

Highway in Puerto Rico

Highway 173
- Ruta 173

Route information
- Maintained by Puerto Rico DTPW
- Length: 32.2 km (20.0 mi)
- Existed: 1953–present

Major junctions
- South end: PR-14 in Robles–Plata
- PR-727 in Plata; PR-775 in Rabanal; PR-7733 in Sud–Rabanal; PR-172 in Cidra barrio-pueblo; PR-782 in Bayamón–Ceiba; PR-156 in Mula–Sumidero; PR-174 in Aguas Buenas barrio-pueblo; PR-156 in Aguas Buenas barrio-pueblo; PR-795 in Bairoa; PR-797 in Sonadora–Jagüeyes
- North end: PR-1 / PR-8834 in Río

Location
- Country: United States
- Territory: Puerto Rico
- Municipalities: Aibonito, Cidra, Aguas Buenas, Guaynabo

Highway system
- Roads in Puerto Rico; List
← PR-172	→ PR-174
← PR-7156	PR-7173	→ PR-7718

Puerto Rico Highway 173 (PR-173) is a road that travels from Aibonito, Puerto Rico to Guaynabo, passing through Cidra and Aguas Buenas. This highway begins at PR-14 junction in Plata and ends at its intersection with PR-1 and PR-8834 in Río.

Puerto Rico Highway 173 by municipality

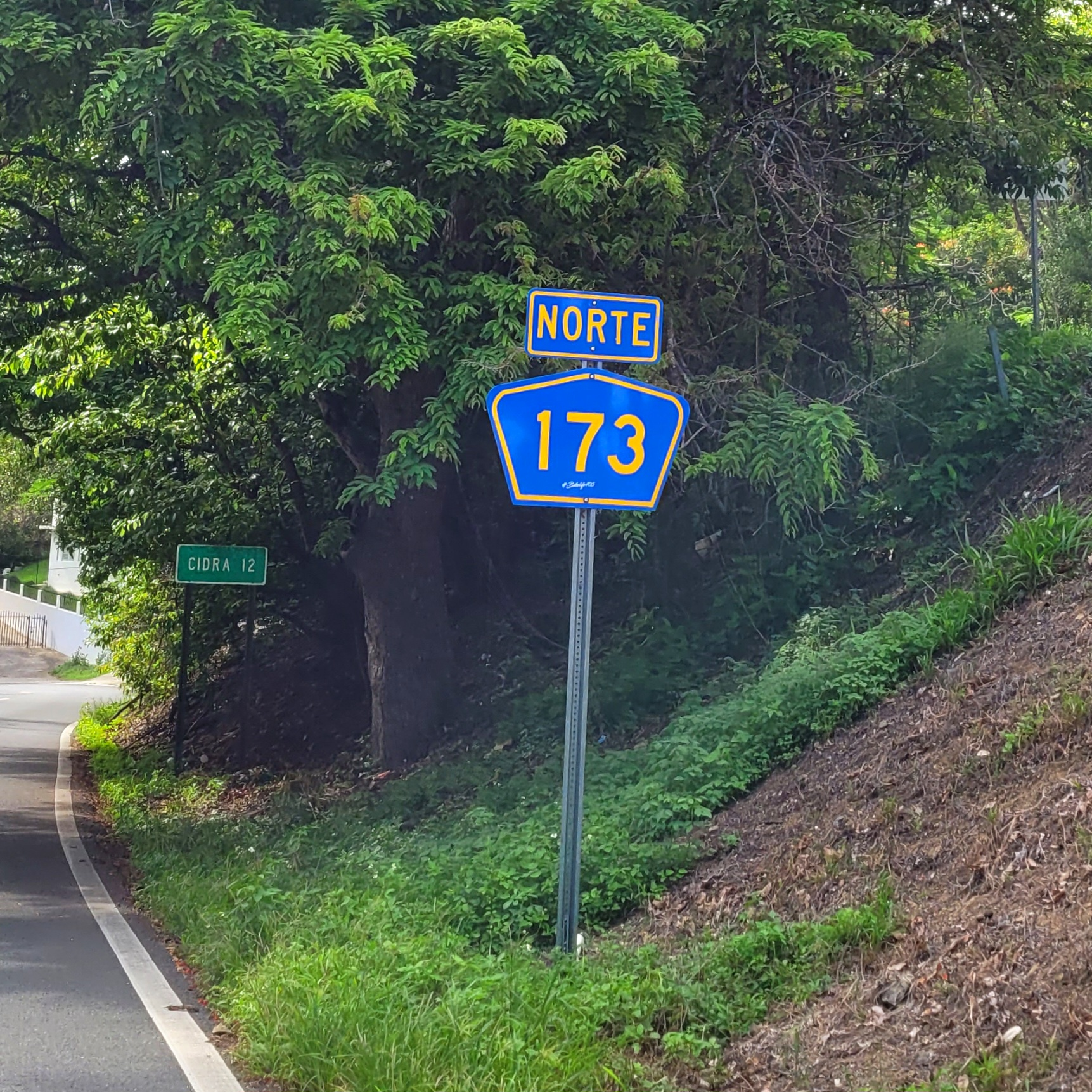
Heading north in Plata, Aibonito

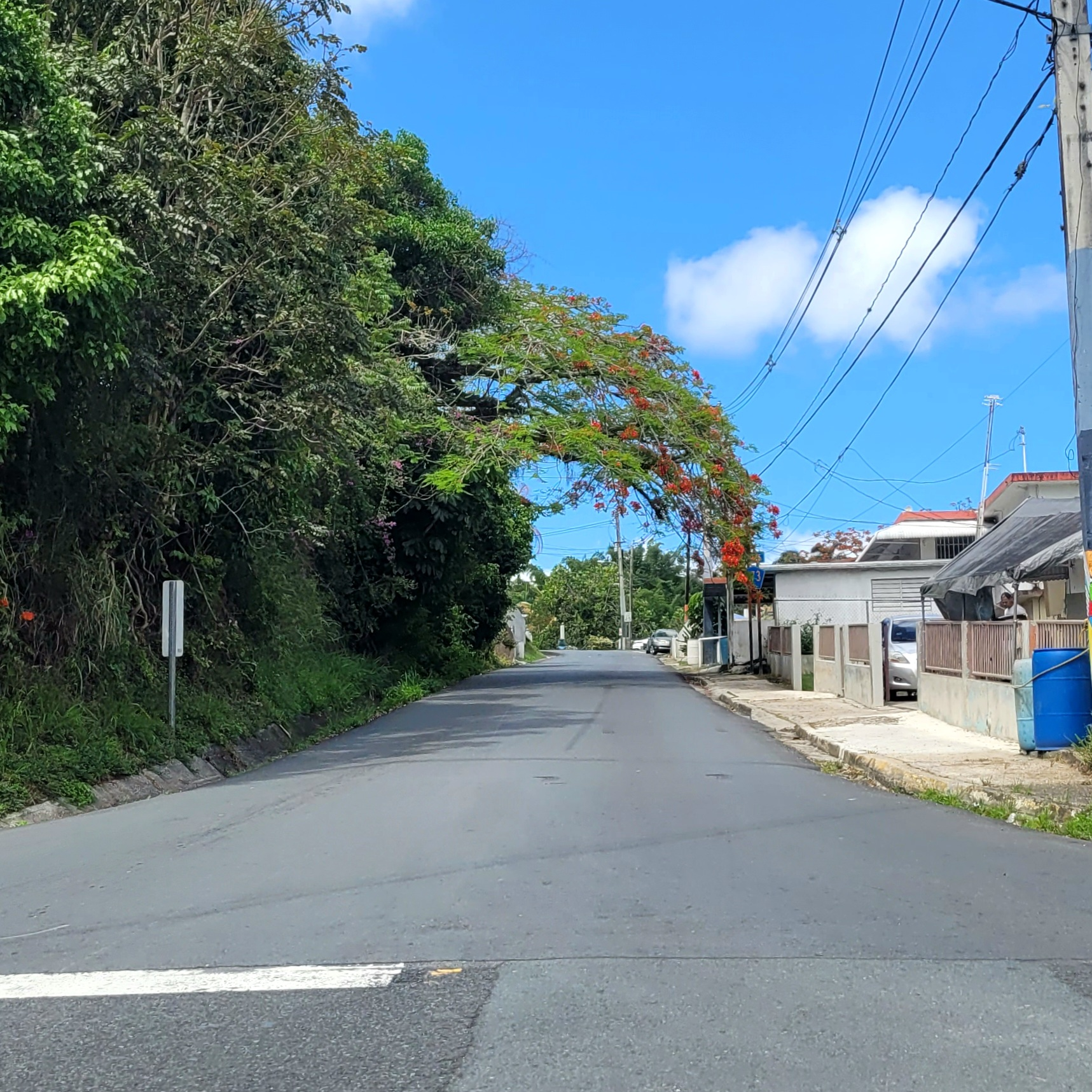
Heading north to downtown Cidra between Rabanal and Sud barrios

== Major intersections ==
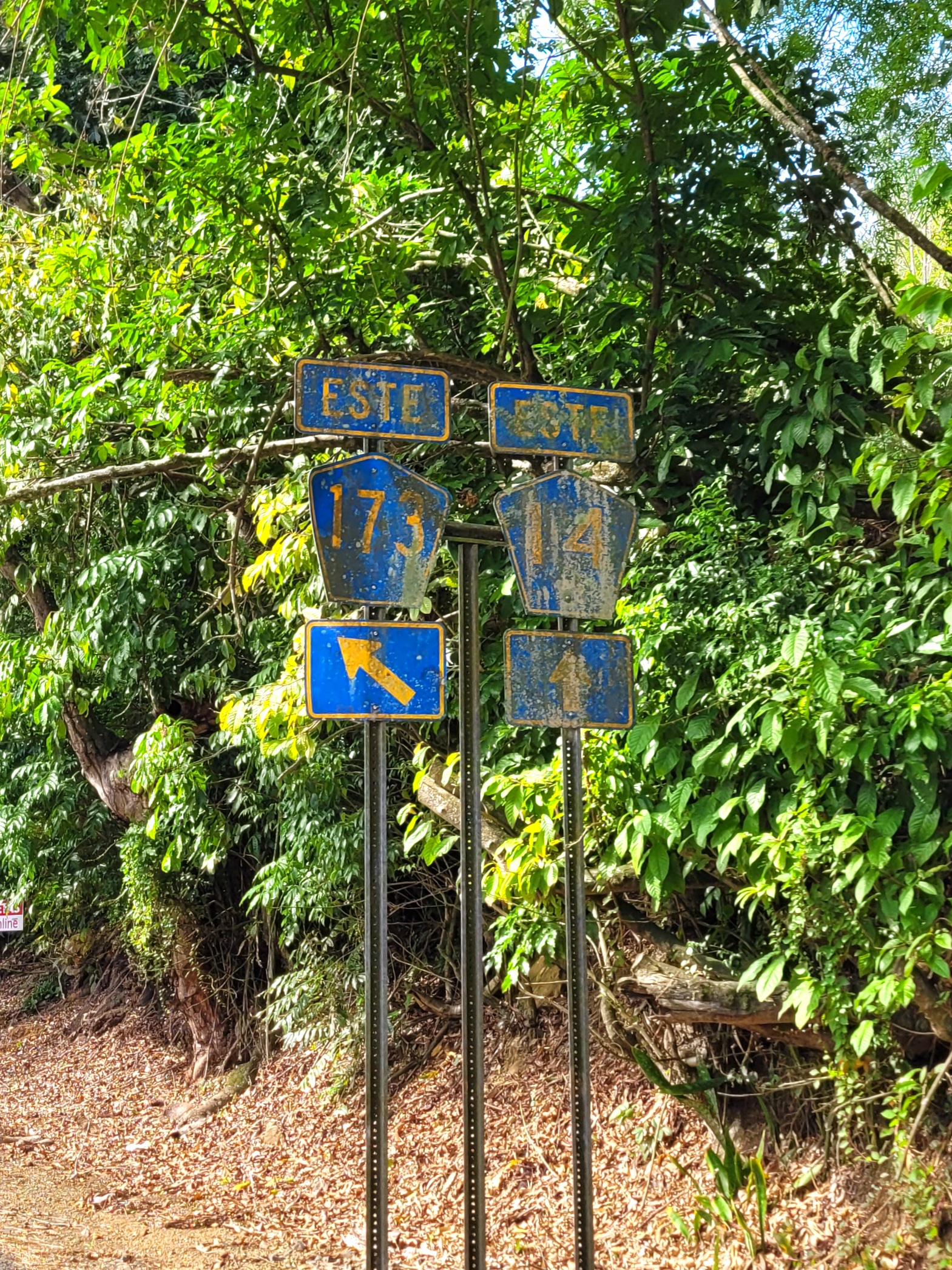
PR-14 east at PR-173 intersection between Plata and Robles barrios, Aibonito

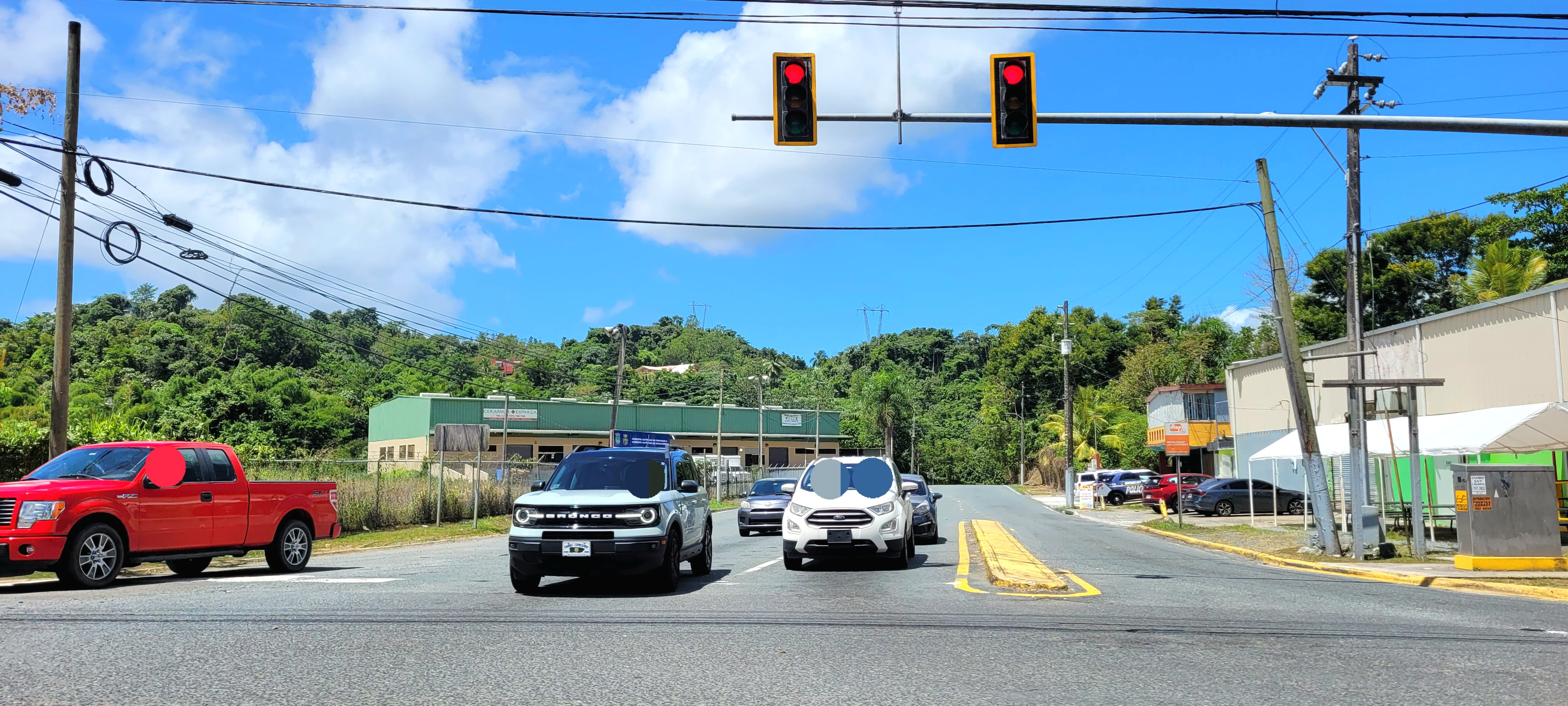
Northern terminus of PR-173 from PR-1 and PR-8834 intersection in Río, Guaynabo

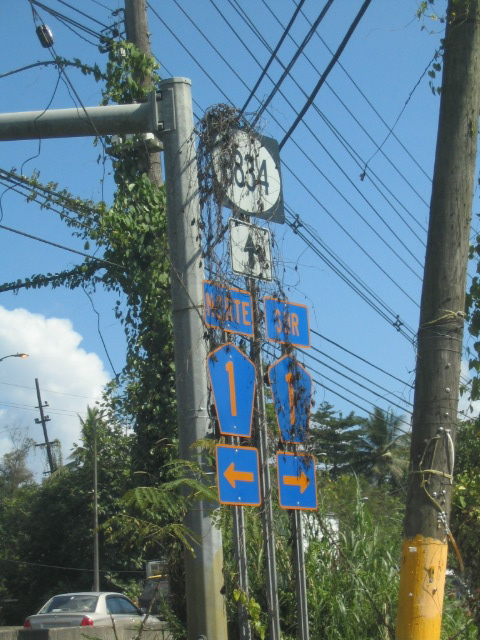
Signs for PR-1 and PR-8834 at the northern terminus of PR-173 in Río, Guaynabo

Municipality	Location	km	mi	Destinations	Notes
Aibonito	Robles–Plata line	0.0	0.0	PR-14 (Carretera Central) – Aibonito, Cayey	Southern terminus of PR-173
Aibonito	Plata	1.5	0.93	PR-728 – Plata	
Aibonito	Plata	2.1– 2.2	1.3– 1.4	PR-727 – Plata	
Cidra	Honduras	5.8	3.6	PR-7730 – Honduras	
Cidra	Rabanal	6.4– 6.5	4.0– 4.0	PR-775 (Carretera Piñas) – Comerío, Piñas	
Cidra	Toíta–Rabanal line	8.0– 8.1	5.0– 5.0	PR-7775 – Rabanal	
Cidra	Rabanal	9.0	5.6	PR-729 – Rincón, Honduras	
Cidra	Sud–Rabanal line	11.6– 11.7	7.2– 7.3	PR-7733 (Avenida de la Eterna Primavera) – Comerío, Caguas	
Cidra	Cidra barrio-pueblo	12.4 12.2 (Note: Kilometer markers represent the distance along PR-172 rather than PR-173.)	7.7 7.6	PR-172 west (Calle José de Diego) – Comerío	Western terminus of PR-173 concurrency
Cidra	Cidra barrio-pueblo	12.3 12.5	7.6 7.8	PR-172 east (Calle José de Diego) – Caguas	Eastern terminus of PR-173 concurrency; one-way street; eastbound access via Calle Miguel Planellas or Calle Vicente Muñoz Barrios
Cidra	Bayamón–Ceiba line	13.8	8.6	PR-782 – Ceiba	
Cidra	Monte Llano–Bayamón line	15.6	9.7	PR-783 – Hacienda Sabanera	
Aguas Buenas	Sumidero	18.7	11.6	PR-7173 – Las Corujas	
Aguas Buenas	Mula–Sumidero line	22.9 47.6 (Note: Kilometer markers represent the distance along PR-156 rather than PR-173.)	14.2 29.6	PR-156 west – Comerío	Western terminus of PR-156 concurrency
Aguas Buenas	Aguas Buenas barrio-pueblo	50.0	31.1	PR-174 – Bayamón	
Aguas Buenas	Aguas Buenas barrio-pueblo	50.3 23.0	31.3 14.3	PR-156 east (Calle Luis Muñoz Rivera) – Caguas	Eastern terminus of PR-156 concurrency
Aguas Buenas	Bairoa	25.4	15.8	PR-795 – La Mesa	
Aguas Buenas	Sonadora–Bairoa line	25.5	15.8	PR-792 – Sonadora	
Aguas Buenas	Jagüeyes–Sonadora line	26.0	16.2	PR-793 – Sonadora	
Aguas Buenas	Jagüeyes–Sonadora line	26.0– 26.1	16.2– 16.2	PR-797 east – Jagüeyes	
Guaynabo	Río	32.2	20.0	PR-1 (Carretera Felipe "La Voz" Rodríguez) – San Juan, Caguas	Northern terminus of PR-173 and southern terminus of PR-8834
Guaynabo	Río	32.2	20.0	PR-8834 (Carretera Central)	Continuation beyond PR-1
1.000 mi = 1.609 km; 1.000 km = 0.621 mi: Concurrency terminus; Incomplete access

== Related route ==
Highway 7173
- Location: Aguas Buenas
- Length: 1.3 km (0.81 mi)

Puerto Rico Highway 7173 (PR-7173) is a dead end road that branches off from PR-173 in Sumidero. The entire route is located in Sumidero, Aguas Buenas.

km	mi	Destinations	Notes
1.3	0.81	Western terminus of PR-7173 at Sector Las Corujas	
0.0	0.0	PR-173 – Aguas Buenas, Cidra	Eastern terminus of PR-7173
1.000 mi = 1.609 km; 1.000 km = 0.621 mi

== See also ==
- 1953 Puerto Rico highway renumbering
