= Luis Arroyo (disambiguation) =

Luis Arroyo (1927–2016) was a Puerto Rican baseball pitcher.

Luis Arroyo may also refer to:

- Luis Arroyo (American politician) (born 1954), American politician and former member of Illinois House of Representatives
- Luis Arroyo (Bolivian footballer) (born 1991), Bolivian football midfielder
- Luis Arroyo Chiques (fl. 2005–2017), Puerto Rican politician and former mayor of Aguas Buenas
- Luis Arroyo (Ecuadorian footballer) (born 1996), Ecuadorian football forward
- Luis Arroyo Jr. (fl. 2015–present), American politician and commissioner, son of politician born 1954 with same name
- Luis Arroyo Sánchez (born 1956), Peruvian politician, appointed prime minister in 2026
- Luis Arroyo (sociologist) (born 1969), Spanish sociologist and political scientist
