= Sonadora =

Sonadora may refer to:

== Places ==
- Sonadora, Aguas Buenas, Puerto Rico, a barrio
- Sonadora, Guaynabo, Puerto Rico, a barrio
