= Bairoa =

Bairoa may refer to:

== Places ==
- Bairoa, Aguas Buenas, Puerto Rico, a barrio
- Bairoa, Caguas, Puerto Rico, a barrio
