= Mulita, Aguas Buenas, Puerto Rico =

Barrio of Puerto Rico

Mulita Mulitas
- Barrio
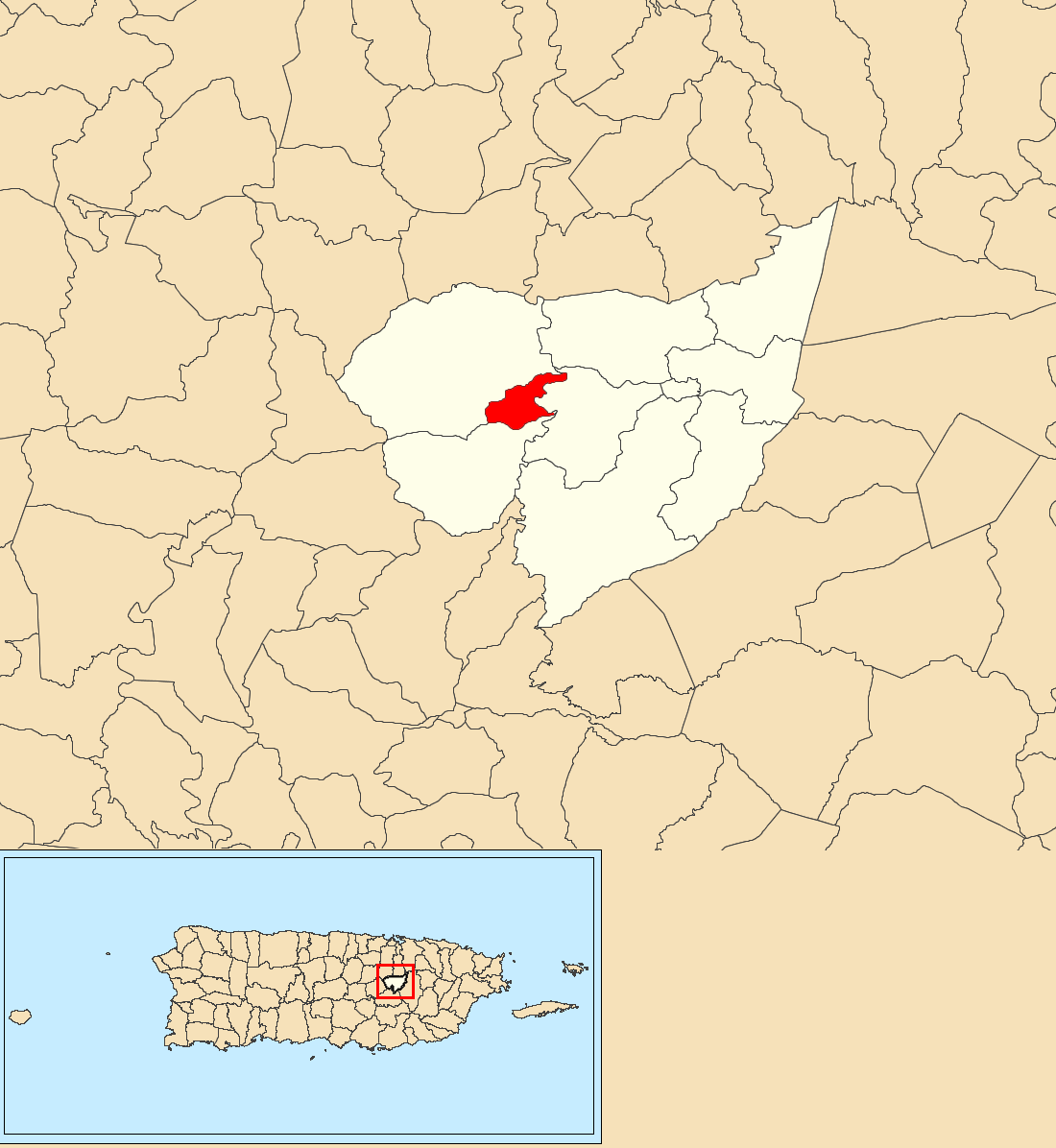
- Location of Mulita within the municipality of Aguas Buenas shown in red

- Location of Puerto Rico
- Coordinates: 18°15′12″N 66°08′40″W
- Commonwealth: Puerto Rico
- Municipality: Aguas Buenas

Area
  - Total: 0.58 sq mi (1.5 km^{2})
  - Land: 0.58 sq mi (1.5 km^{2})
  - Water: 0.00 sq mi (0 km^{2})
- Elevation: 1,037 ft (316 m)

Population (2010)
  - Total: 266
  - Density: 458.6/sq mi (177.1/km^{2})
- Source: 2010 Census
- Time zone: UTC−4 (AST)
- ZIP Code: 00703
- Area code: 787/939

Mulita also spelled Mulitas is a barrio in the municipality of Aguas Buenas, Puerto Rico. Its population in 2010 was 266.

== History ==
Mulita was in Spain's gazetteers until Puerto Rico was ceded by Spain in the aftermath of the Spanish–American War under the terms of the Treaty of Paris of 1898 and became an unincorporated territory of the United States. In 1899, the United States Department of War conducted a census of Puerto Rico finding that the population of Mulita barrio was 752.

Historical population
Census	Pop.	Note	%±
1900	752		—
1910	708		−5.9%
1920	965		36.3%
1930	1,082		12.1%
1940	1,077		−0.5%
1950	316		−70.7%
1960	344		8.9%
1970	97		−71.8%
1980	232		139.2%
1990	194		−16.4%
2000	267		37.6%
2010	266		−0.4%
U.S. Decennial Census; 1899 (shown as 1900) 1910-1930; 1930-1950 1980-2000 2010

== See also ==
- List of communities in Puerto Rico
