= Juan Asencio, Aguas Buenas, Puerto Rico =

Barrio of Puerto Rico

Juan Asencio
- Barrio
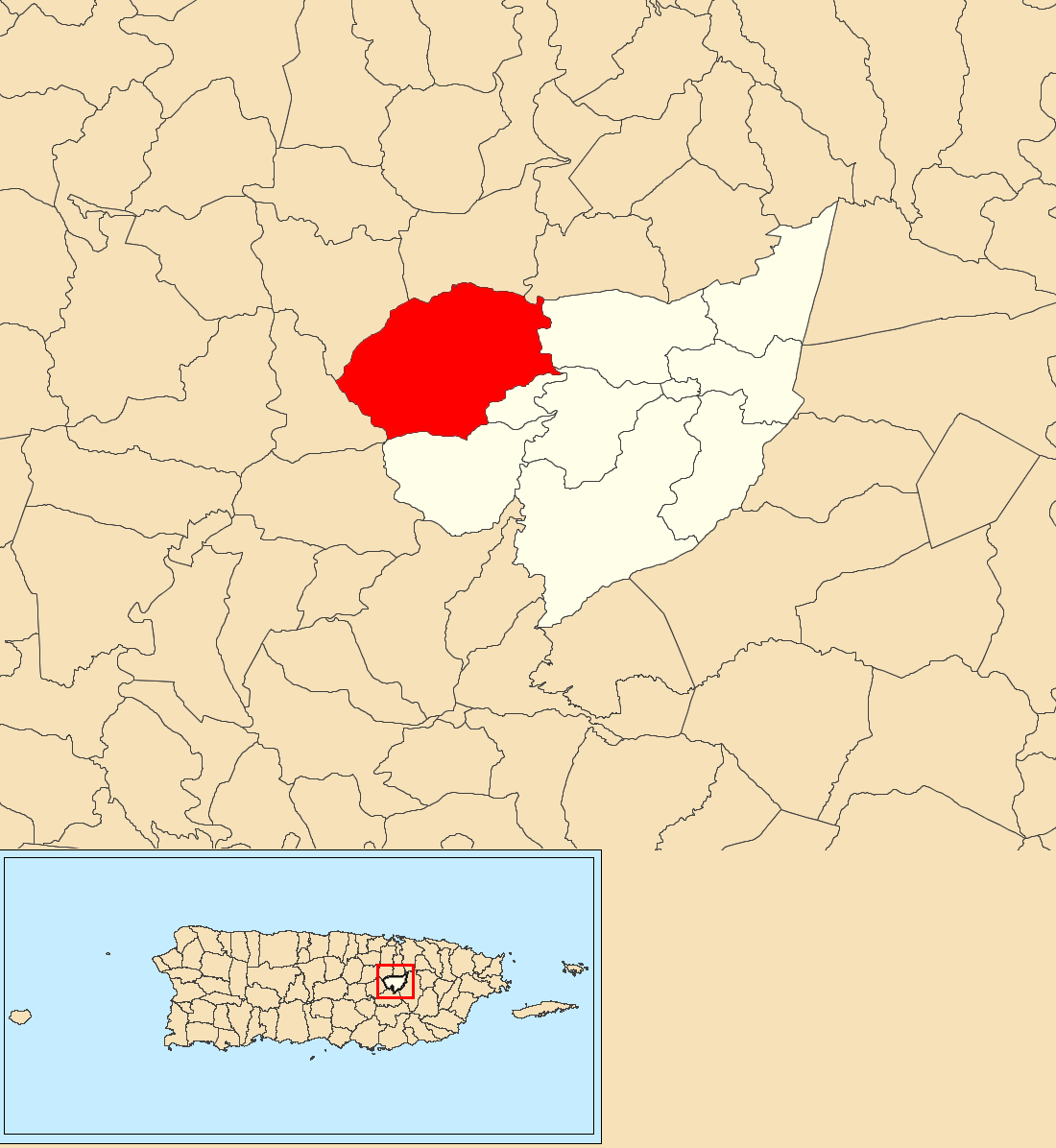
- Location of Juan Asencio within the municipality of Aguas Buenas shown in red

- Location of Puerto Rico
- Coordinates: 18°15′46″N 66°09′52″W
- Commonwealth: Puerto Rico
- Municipality: Aguas Buenas

Area
  - Total: 6.26 sq mi (16.2 km^{2})
  - Land: 6.26 sq mi (16.2 km^{2})
  - Water: 0.00 sq mi (0 km^{2})
- Elevation: 1,253 ft (382 m)

Population (2010)
  - Total: 2,819
  - Density: 450.3/sq mi (173.9/km^{2})
- Source: 2010 Census
- Time zone: UTC−4 (AST)
- ZIP Code: 00703
- Area code: 787/939

Juan Asencio is a barrio in the municipality of Aguas Buenas, Puerto Rico. Its population in 2010 was 2,819.

== History ==
Juan Asencio was in Spain's gazetteers until Puerto Rico was ceded by Spain in the aftermath of the Spanish–American War under the terms of the Treaty of Paris of 1898 and became an unincorporated territory of the United States. In 1899, the United States Department of War conducted a census of Puerto Rico finding that the population of Juan Asencio barrio was 1,029.

Historical population
Census	Pop.	Note	%±
1900	1,029		—
1910	988		−4.0%
1920	1,139		15.3%
1930	1,227		7.7%
1940	1,376		12.1%
1950	1,779		29.3%
1960	1,423		−20.0%
1970	1,623		14.1%
1980	2,617		61.2%
1990	2,595		−0.8%
2000	2,860		10.2%
2010	2,819		−1.4%
U.S. Decennial Census; 1899 (shown as 1900) 1910-1930; 1930-1950 1980-2000 2010

== See also ==
- List of communities in Puerto Rico
