= Luis Arroyo Chiques =

Puerto Rican politician

Mayor of Aguas Buenas
- In office January 14, 2005 – January 14, 2017
- Preceded by: Bonny Dávila
- Succeeded by: Javier García Pérez

Personal details
- Party: Popular Democratic Party (PPD)

Luis Arroyo Chiques is a Puerto Rican politician and the former mayor of Aguas Buenas. Arroyo is affiliated with the Popular Democratic Party (PPD) and served as mayor from 2005 until 2017. In 2015, he announced that he would not seek reelection.

Luis Arroyo Chiques pleaded guilty in December 2021 for receiving some $270,000 in kickbacks for awarding a contract to the Waste Collection company. A federal district court judge sentenced him to 24 months in prison and two years of probation for conspiracy to commit bribery.
