= Mula, Aguas Buenas, Puerto Rico =

Barrio of Puerto Rico

Mula
- Barrio
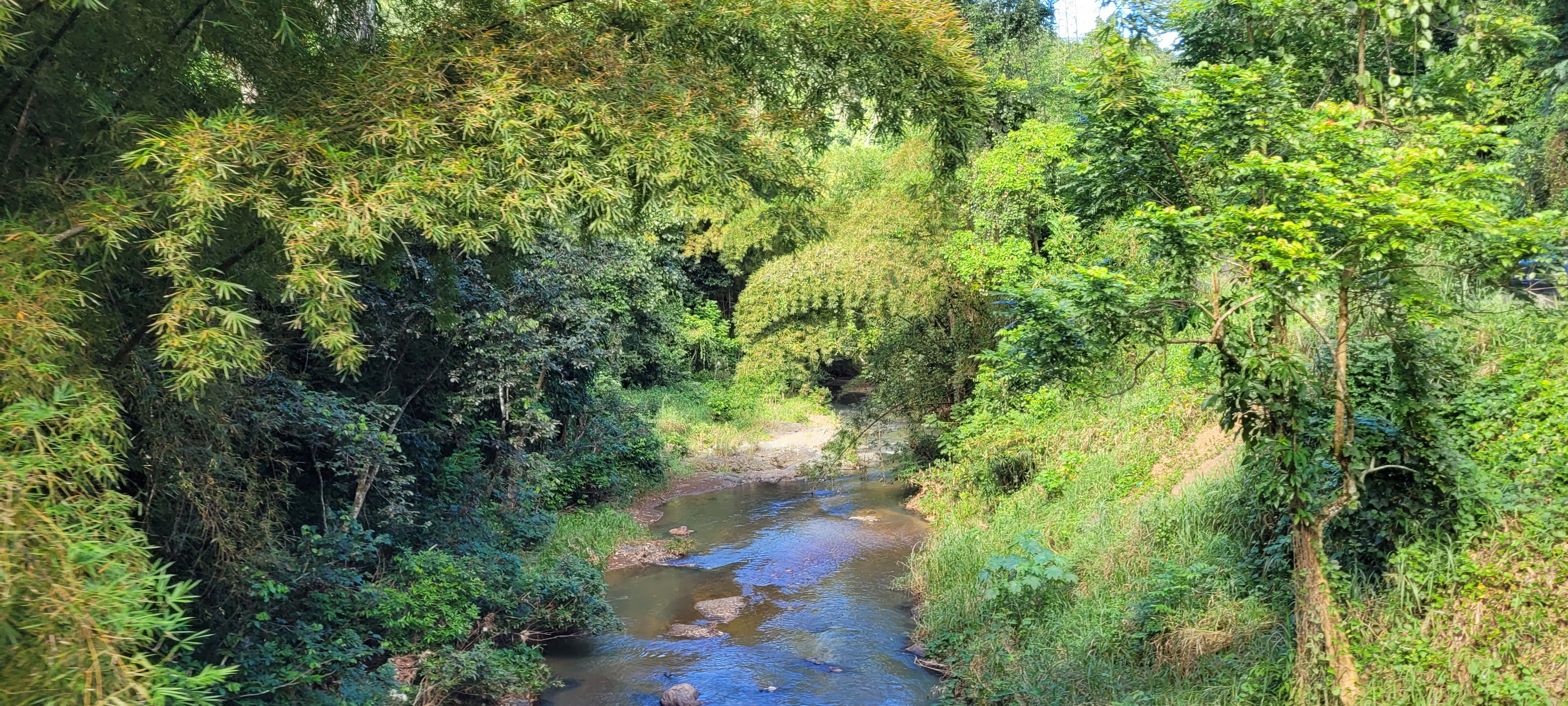
- Bayamón River between Mula and Bayamoncito

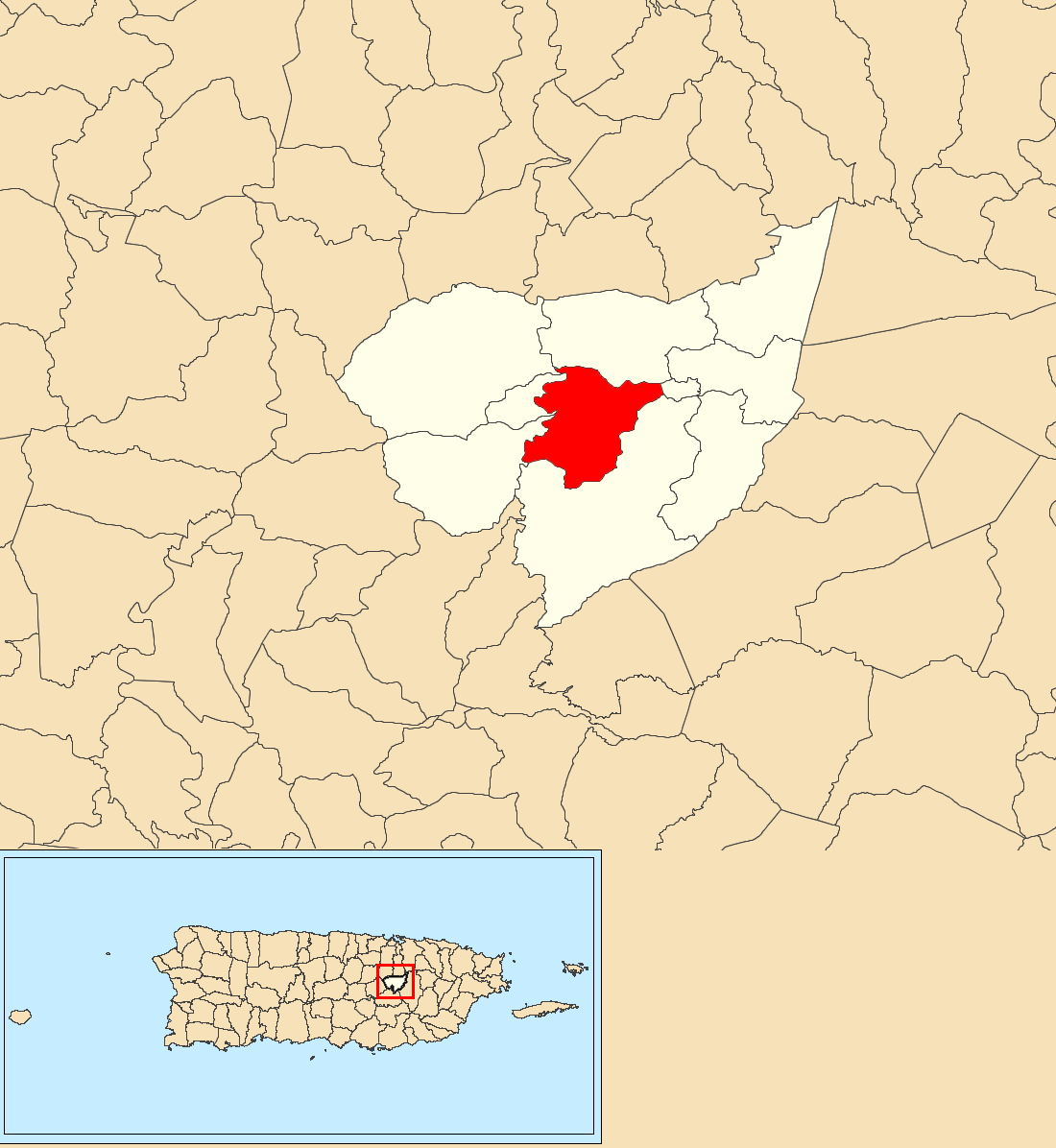
- Location of Mula within the municipality of Aguas Buenas shown in red

- Location of Puerto Rico
- Coordinates: 18°14′54″N 66°07′50″W
- Commonwealth: Puerto Rico
- Municipality: Aguas Buenas

Area
  - Total: 2.56 sq mi (6.6 km^{2})
  - Land: 2.56 sq mi (6.6 km^{2})
  - Water: 0.00 sq mi (0 km^{2})
- Elevation: 1,079 ft (329 m)

Population (2010)
  - Total: 3,842
  - Density: 1,500.8/sq mi (579.5/km^{2})
- Source: 2010 Census
- Time zone: UTC−4 (AST)
- ZIP Code: 00703
- Area code: 787/939

Mula is a barrio in the municipality of Aguas Buenas, Puerto Rico. Its population in 2010 was 3,842. In Mula barrio is part of the Aguas Buenas urban zone.

== History ==
Mula was in Spain's gazetteers until Puerto Rico was ceded by Spain in the aftermath of the Spanish–American War under the terms of the Treaty of Paris of 1898 and became an unincorporated territory of the United States. In 1899, the United States Department of War conducted a census of Puerto Rico finding that the combined population of Mulas and Sonadora barrios was 1,183.

Historical population
Census	Pop.	Note	%±
1910	622		—
1920	620		−0.3%
1930	1,069		72.4%
1940	1,066		−0.3%
1950	987		−7.4%
1960	1,248		26.4%
1970	0		−100.0%
1980	2,441		—
1990	3,213		31.6%
2000	3,657		13.8%
2010	3,842		5.1%
U.S. Decennial Census; 1900 (N/A) 1910-1930; 1930-1950 1980-2000 2010

== See also ==
- List of communities in Puerto Rico
