= Bayamoncito, Aguas Buenas, Puerto Rico =

Barrio of Puerto Rico

Bayamoncito
- Barrio
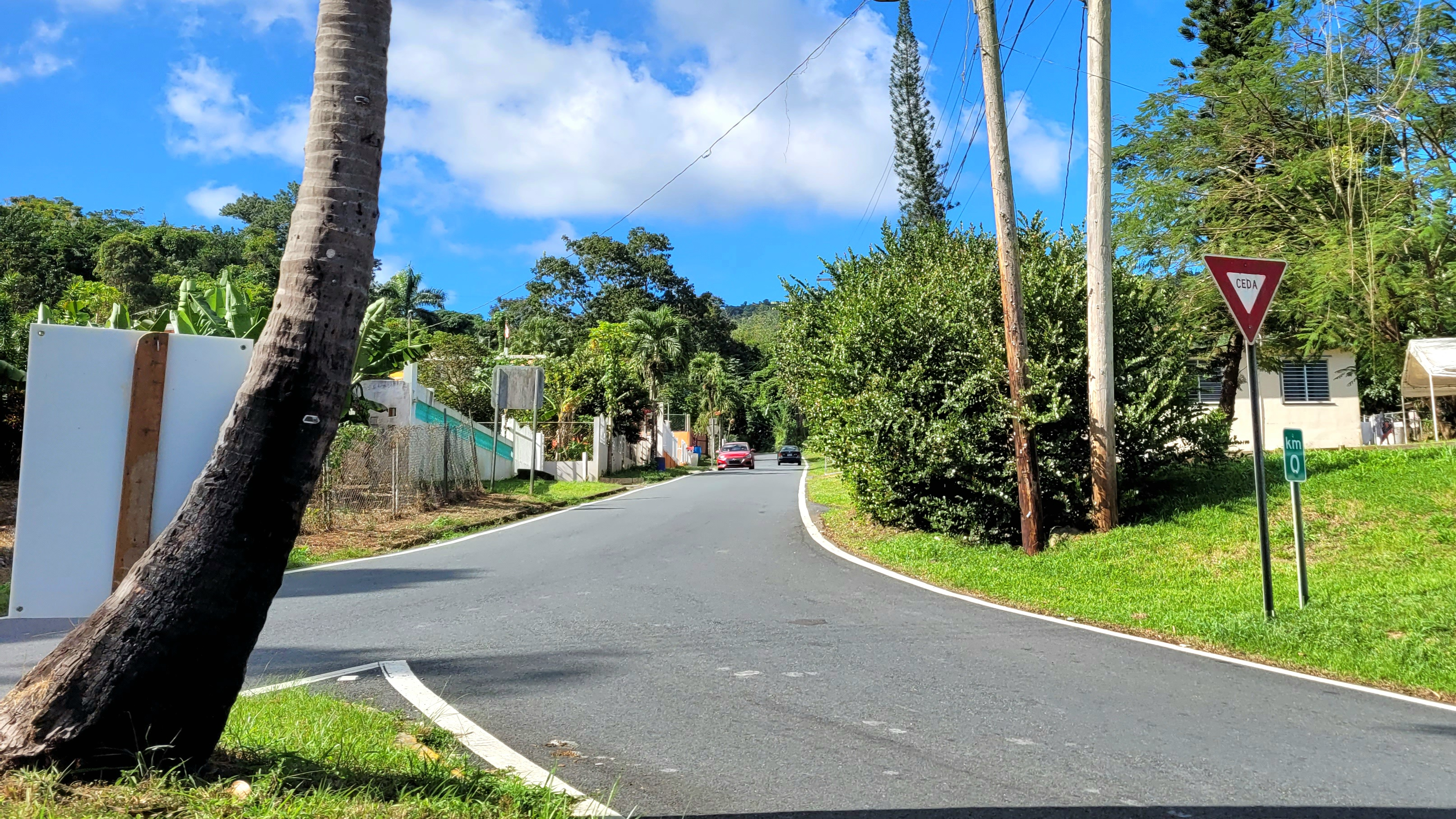
- Puerto Rico Highway 790 in Bayamoncito

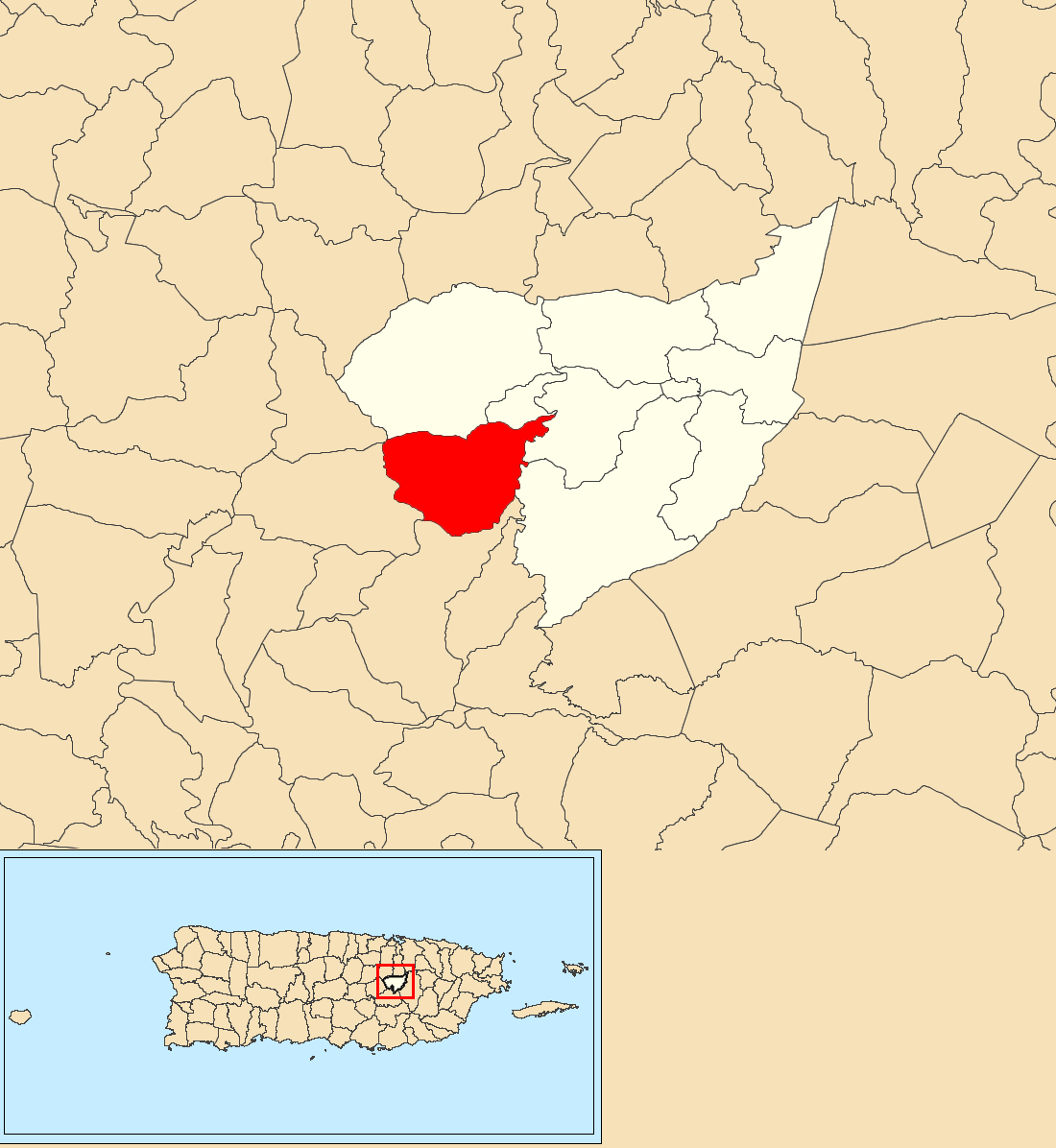
- Location of Bayamoncito within the municipality of Aguas Buenas shown in red

- Location of Puerto Rico
- Coordinates: 18°14′08″N 66°09′49″W
- Commonwealth: Puerto Rico
- Municipality: Aguas Buenas

Area
  - Total: 3.31 sq mi (8.6 km^{2})
  - Land: 3.31 sq mi (8.6 km^{2})
  - Water: 0.00 sq mi (0 km^{2})
- Elevation: 1,207 ft (368 m)

Population (2010)
  - Total: 1,738
  - Density: 525.1/sq mi (202.7/km^{2})
- Source: 2010 Census
- Time zone: UTC−4 (AST)
- ZIP Code: 00703
- Area code: 787/939

Bayamoncito Barrio is a barrio in the municipality of Aguas Buenas, Puerto Rico. Its population in 2010 was 1,738.

== History ==
Bayamoncito was in Spain's gazetteers until Puerto Rico was ceded by Spain in the aftermath of the Spanish–American War under the terms of the Treaty of Paris of 1898 and became an unincorporated territory of the United States. In 1899, the United States Department of War conducted a census of Puerto Rico finding that the population of Bayamoncito barrio was 765.

Historical population
Census	Pop.	Note	%±
1900	765		—
1910	712		−6.9%
1920	983		38.1%
1930	1,307		33.0%
1940	1,366		4.5%
1950	1,282		−6.1%
1960	1,142		−10.9%
1970	1,425		24.8%
1980	1,548		8.6%
1990	1,947		25.8%
2000	1,897		−2.6%
2010	1,738		−8.4%
U.S. Decennial Census; 1899 (shown as 1900) 1910-1930; 1930-1950 1980-2000 2010

== Special Communities ==
In 2001, law 1-2001 was passed to identify marginalized communities of Puerto Rico. In 2017, Governor Ricardo Rosselló created a new government agency to work with the Special Communities of Puerto Rico Program. Las Parcelas in Bayamoncito is one of the 742 places on the list of Comunidades Especiales de Puerto Rico.

== See also ==
- List of communities in Puerto Rico
