= Luis Arroyo (sociologist) =

Spanish sociologist, political scientist

- Born: 1969 (age 56–57); Madrid
- Education: Universidad Complutense de Madrid
- Occupations: Sociologist, Political Advisor
- Organization: Ateneo de Madrid
- Political party: PSOE
- Website: https://www.asesoresdecomunicacionpublica.com/

Luis Arroyo Martínez (born 1969, Madrid) is a Spanish sociologist and political scientist, advisor to several governments of José Luis Rodríguez Zapatero, and consultant to the World Bank. He chairs the Ateneo de Madrid and the communications consulting firm Asesores de Comunicación Pública. He teaches at some universities in Spain and America and is the author of several essays.

== Biography ==
He holds a degree in Political Science and Sociology from the Complutense University of Madrid and has doctoral studies at the Complutense University and Georgetown University.

He has developed his career mainly as a political consultant and advisor. He was director of crisis communications and public affairs at the multinational Edelman and held senior positions in the governments of José Luis Rodríguez Zapatero. He was cabinet director of the Secretaries of State for Communication Miguel Barroso and Fernando Moraleda; deputy director in the cabinet of the first vice-president, María Teresa Fernández de la Vega, and director of the cabinet of the minister Carme Chacón when she occupied the Ministry of Housing.

As a consultant, he advises governments, prime ministers, and political, business, and social leaders in several Latin American and European countries.

A specialist in political communication, he has been one of the promoters of its professionalization. He was the founder and president of the Asociación de Comunicación Política (ACOP), and a member of the Board of Directors of the Asociación de Directivos de Comunicación de España, Dircom. Since 2008, he has chaired the firm Asesores de Comunicación Pública.

He began teaching "Marketing, Communication, and Consumer Behavior" at the Florida Atlantic University (FAU) in Boca Raton in 1996. He is a lecturer in several areas related to strategy, political communication, and public speaking at the National Institute of Public Administration (INAP), for which he founded the first advanced course on communication in Public Administration; at IE University, ESADE, Instituto Ortega y Gasset, Escuela de Administración de Empresas (EAE), Universidad Carlos III, Universidad ESAN (Peru), Universidad Pontificia de Salamanca, Universidad de Navarra, and Universidad Complutense de Madrid.

He has been a trustee of the John XXIII-Roncalli Foundation, dedicated to people with intellectual disabilities, a member of the board of the Spanish Society of Studies for Fixed Communication across the Strait of Gibraltar (SECEGSA), and a member of the Real Casa de la Moneda.

In June 2021, he became president of the Ateneo de Madrid, after winning the elections with Candidatura 1820 and a program of generational renewal, digitalization, and enhancement of its assets.

After Felipe VI's failed speech at the Prince of Asturias Awards ceremony, he and his team decided to design a portable teleprompter, the prompter-in-a-box, whose patent is in his name.

He is the author and co-author of several essays on communication. He collaborates as analyst in several Spanish and Latin American media, such as Televisión Española, Radio Cadena SER, and Infolibre, among others.

== Bibliography ==
- El poder político en escena: historia, estrategia y liturgias de la comunicación política (RBA, 2013).
- Frases como puños: el lenguaje y las ideas progresistas (Edhasa, 2013)
- With Magali Yus: Los cien errores en la comunicación de las organizaciones (ESIC, 2011).
- Several Authors: Cajas mágicas: El renacimiento de la televisión pública en América Latina (Tecnos, 2013)
- Several Authors: Gestión actual del consultor político (LID, 2010)
