= Jagüeyes, Aguas Buenas, Puerto Rico =

Barrio of Puerto Rico

Jagüeyes
- Barrio
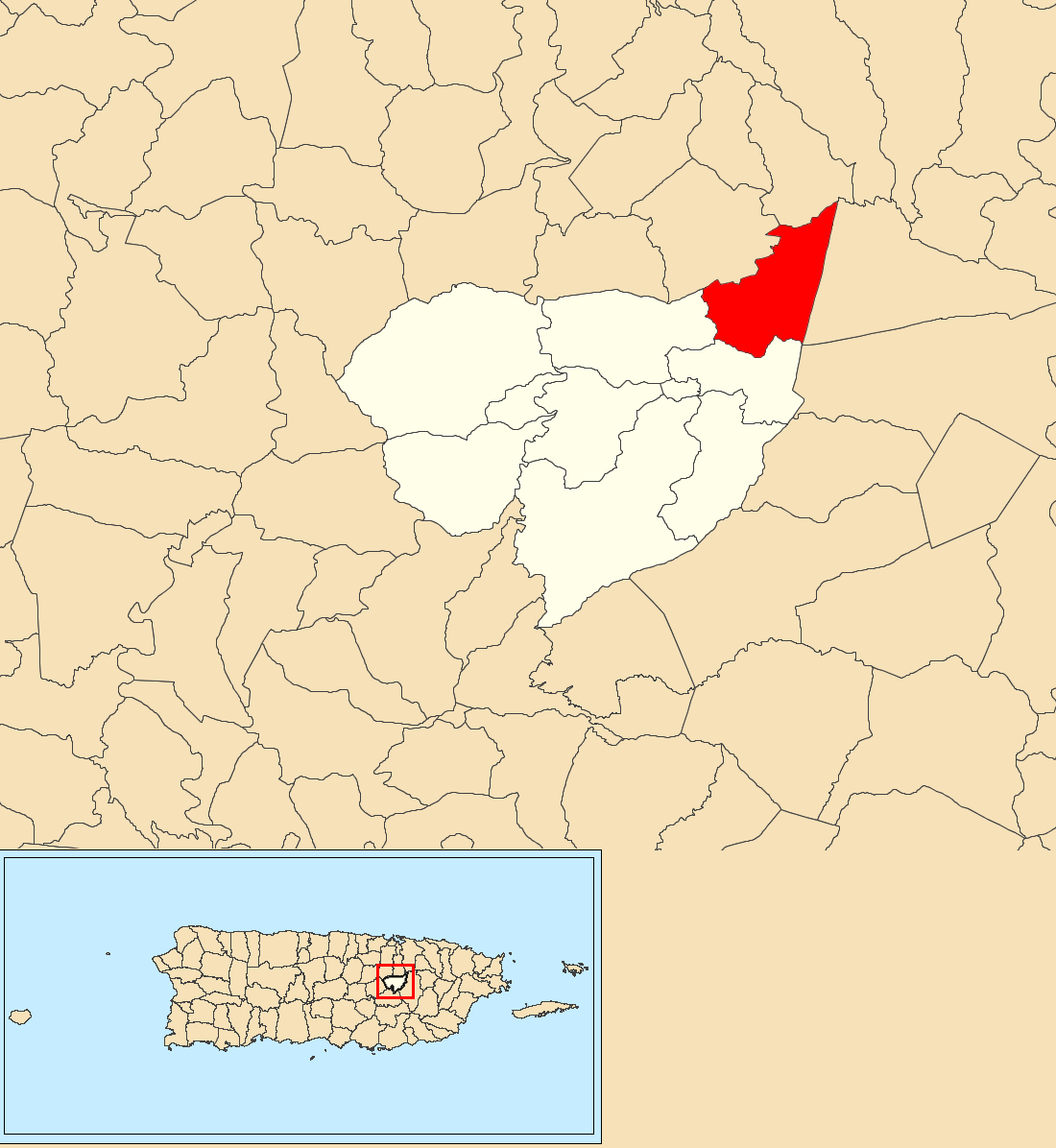
- Location of Jagüeyes within the municipality of Aguas Buenas shown in red

- Location of Puerto Rico
- Coordinates: 18°16′52″N 66°04′56″W
- Commonwealth: Puerto Rico
- Municipality: Aguas Buenas

Area
  - Total: 2.81 sq mi (7.3 km^{2})
  - Land: 2.81 sq mi (7.3 km^{2})
  - Water: 0.00 sq mi (0 km^{2})
- Elevation: 663 ft (202 m)

Population (2010)
  - Total: 1,976
  - Density: 703.2/sq mi (271.5/km^{2})
- Source: 2010 Census
- Time zone: UTC−4 (AST)
- ZIP Code: 00703
- Area code: 787/939

Jagüeyes is a barrio in the municipality of Aguas Buenas, Puerto Rico. Its population in 2010 was 1,976.

== History ==
Jagüeyes was in Spain's gazetteers until Puerto Rico was ceded by Spain in the aftermath of the Spanish–American War under the terms of the Treaty of Paris of 1898 and became an unincorporated territory of the United States. In 1899, the United States Department of War conducted a census of Puerto Rico finding that the combined population of Jagüeyes and Bairoa barrios was 1,099.

Historical population
Census	Pop.	Note	%±
1910	808		—
1920	1,124		39.1%
1930	1,163		3.5%
1940	1,402		20.6%
1950	1,272		−9.3%
1960	1,442		13.4%
1970	1,382		−4.2%
1980	1,538		11.3%
1990	1,666		8.3%
2000	2,487		49.3%
2010	1,976		−20.5%
U.S. Decennial Census; 1900 (N/A) 1910-1930; 1930-1950 1980-2000 2010

== See also ==
- List of communities in Puerto Rico
