= Luis Arroyo (Bolivian footballer) =

Bolivian footballer (born 1991)

Personal information
- Full name: Luis Daniel Arroyo Cabrera
- Date of birth: July 17, 1991 (age 35)
- Place of birth: Bolivia
- Position: Midfielder

Team information
- Current team: Blooming
- Number: 25

Senior career*
Years	Team	Apps	(Gls)
2010–2012	Club Universitario	2	(0)
2012-pres	Blooming	10	(0)
- * Club domestic league appearances and goals

Luis Daniel Arroyo Cabrera (born July 17, 1991, in Bolivia) is a Bolivian footballer who since 2012 has played midfielder for Blooming.

== Club career statistics ==
Club performance			League		Cup		League Cup		Total	
Season	Club	League	Apps	Goals	Apps	Goals	Apps	Goals	Apps	Goals
League		Apertura and Clausura			Copa Aerosur		Total			
2010	Club Universitario	Liga de Fútbol Profesional Boliviano	-	-	-	-	-	-	-	-
2011	Club Universitario	Liga de Fútbol Profesional Boliviano	2	0	-	-	-	-	2	0
2011/12	Club Universitario	Liga de Fútbol Profesional Boliviano	-	-	-	-	-	-	-	-
2012/13	Blooming	Liga de Fútbol Profesional Boliviano	9	0	-	-	-	-	9	0
2013/14	Blooming	Liga de Fútbol Profesional Boliviano	1	0	-	-	-	-	1	0
Total			12	0	-	-	-	-	12	0
