= Aguas Buenas barrio-pueblo =

Historical and administrative center (seat) of Aguas Buenas, Puerto Rico

Aguas Buenas barrio-pueblo Pueblo de Aguas Buenas
- Municipality Seat
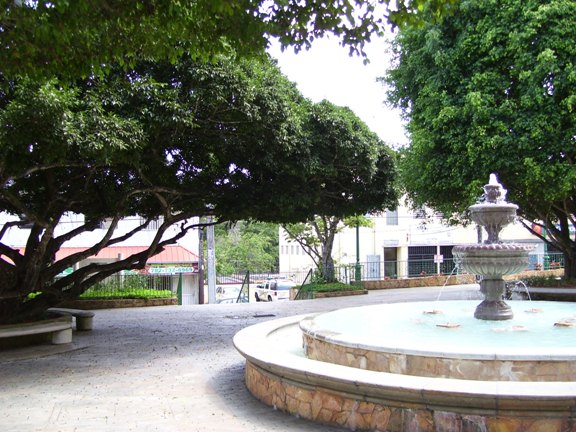
- The Central Plaza of Aguas Buenas in 2007

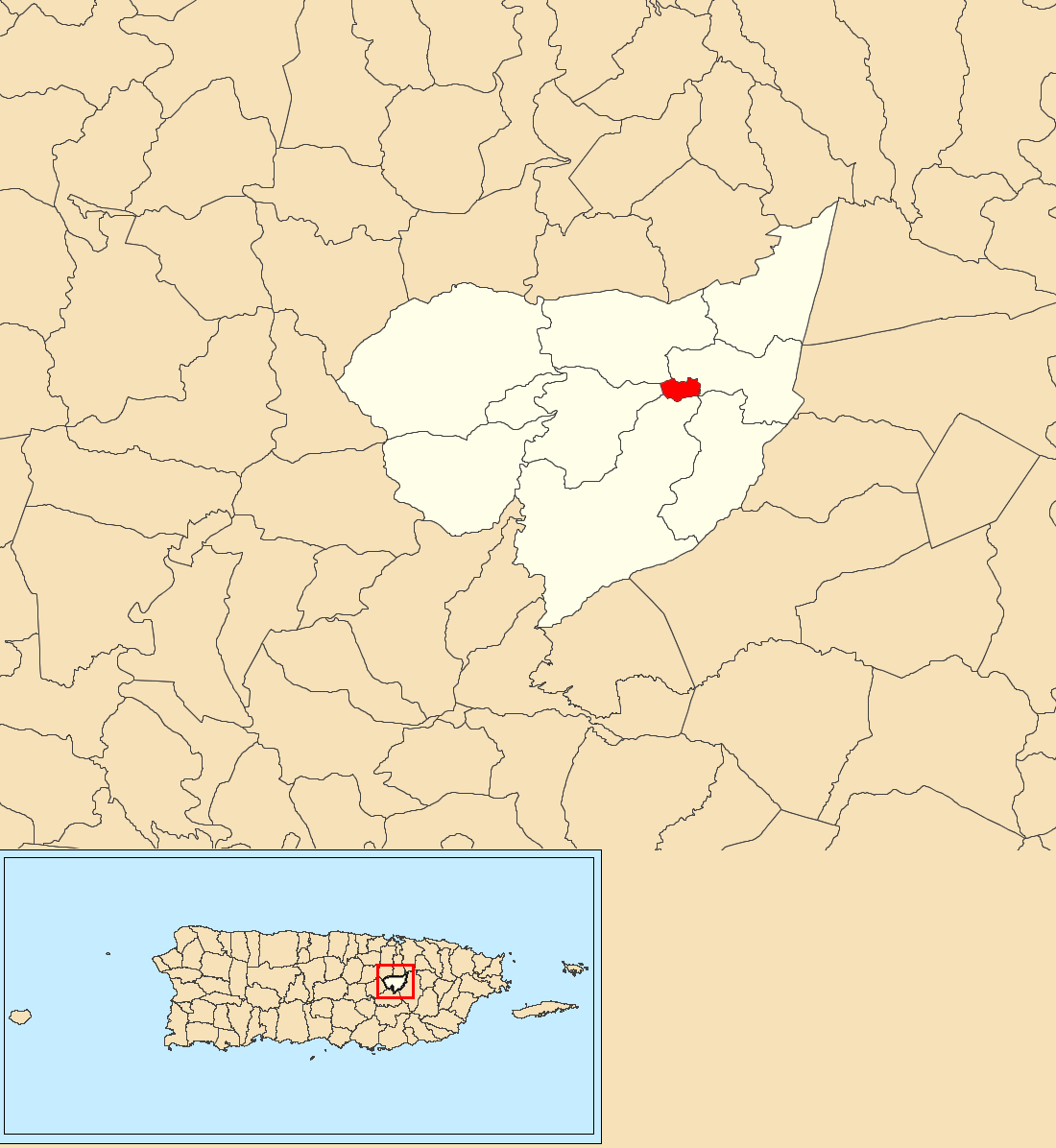
- Location of Aguas Buenas barrio-pueblo within the municipality of Aguas Buenas shown in red

- Location of Puerto Rico
- Coordinates: 18°15′23″N 66°06′20″W
- Commonwealth: Puerto Rico
- Municipality: Aguas Buenas

Area
  - Total: 0.18 sq mi (0.47 km^{2})
  - Land: 0.18 sq mi (0.47 km^{2})
  - Water: 0.00 sq mi (0 km^{2})
- Elevation: 850 ft (260 m)

Population (2010)
  - Total: 1,711
  - Density: 9,505.6/sq mi (3,670.1/km^{2})
- Source: 2010 Census
- Time zone: UTC−4 (AST)
- ZIP Code: 00703
- Area code: 787/939

Aguas Buenas barrio-pueblo is a barrio and the administrative center (seat) of Aguas Buenas, a municipality of Puerto Rico. Its population in 2010 was 1,711.

As was customary in Spain, in Puerto Rico, the municipality has a barrio called pueblo which contains a central plaza, the municipal buildings (city hall), and a Catholic church. Fiestas patronales (patron saint festivals) are held in the central plaza every year.

== The central plaza and its church ==
The central plaza, or square, is a place for official and unofficial recreational events and a place where people can gather and socialize from dusk to dawn. The Laws of the Indies, Spanish law, which regulated life in Puerto Rico in the early 19th century, stated the plaza's purpose was for "the parties" (celebrations, festivities) (Spanish: a propósito para las fiestas), and that the square should be proportionally large enough for the number of neighbors (Spanish: grandeza proporcionada al número de vecinos). These Spanish regulations also stated that the streets nearby should be comfortable portals for passersby, protecting them from the elements: sun and rain.

Located across from the central plaza in Aguas Buenas barrio-pueblo is the Parroquía Los Tres Santos Reyes, a Roman Catholic church. Other churches had been constructed in the area as early as 1834. A church made of cement was constructed in 1926 and provided services until it was demolished in 1968. The current church was designed by Gonzalo González Seijo and inaugurated in 1969.

== History ==
Aguas Buenas barrio-pueblo was in Spain's gazetteers until Puerto Rico was ceded by Spain in the aftermath of the Spanish–American War under the terms of the Treaty of Paris of 1898 and became an unincorporated territory of the United States. In 1899, the United States Department of War conducted a census of Puerto Rico finding that the population of Pueblo was 1,309.

Historical population
Census	Pop.	Note	%±
1900	1,309		—
1910	1,166		−10.9%
1920	1,999		71.4%
1930	2,059		3.0%
1940	2,376		15.4%
1950	2,671		12.4%
1960	2,470		−7.5%
1970	0		−100.0%
1980	1,959		—
1990	2,080		6.2%
2000	1,990		−4.3%
2010	1,711		−14.0%
U.S. Decennial Census; 1899 (shown as 1900) 1910-1930; 1930-1950 1980-2000 2010

== Gallery ==
Places in Aguas Buenas barrio-pueblo:

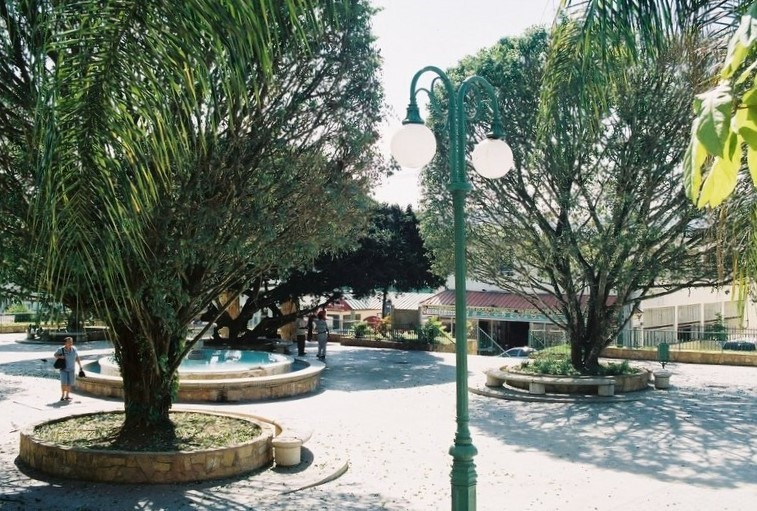
Central Plaza

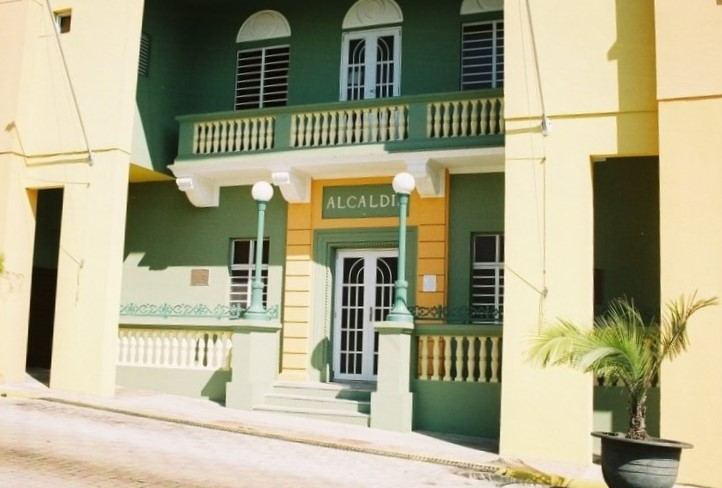
Town Hall (Casa Alcaldía)

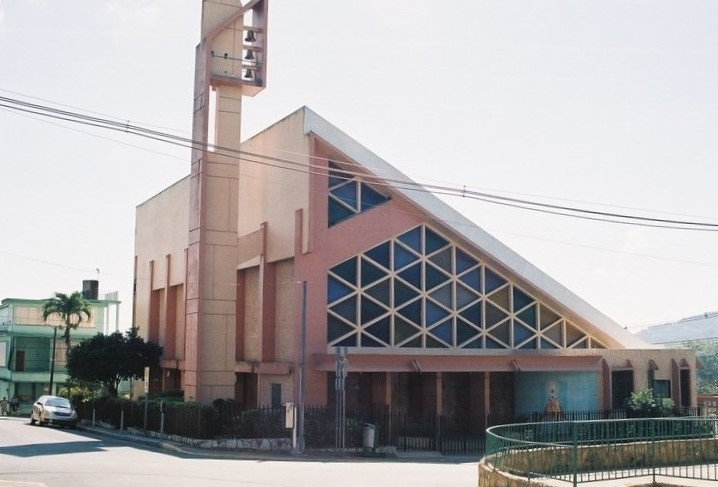
Los Tres Santos Reyes church

== See also ==
- List of communities in Puerto Rico
