= Sumidero, Aguas Buenas, Puerto Rico =

Barrio of Puerto Rico

Sumidero
- Barrio
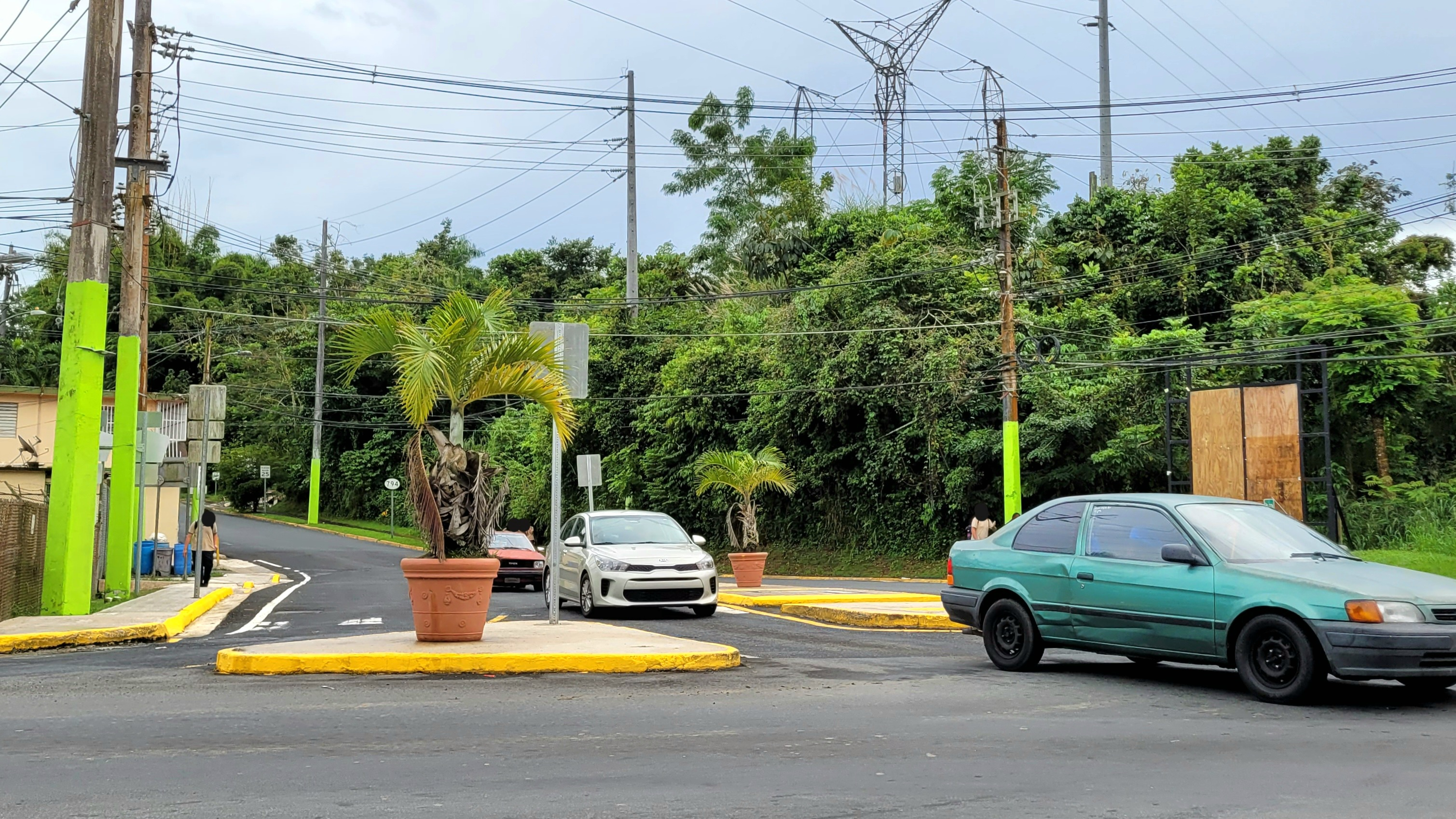
- Puerto Rico Highway 794 between Sumidero and Cagüitas

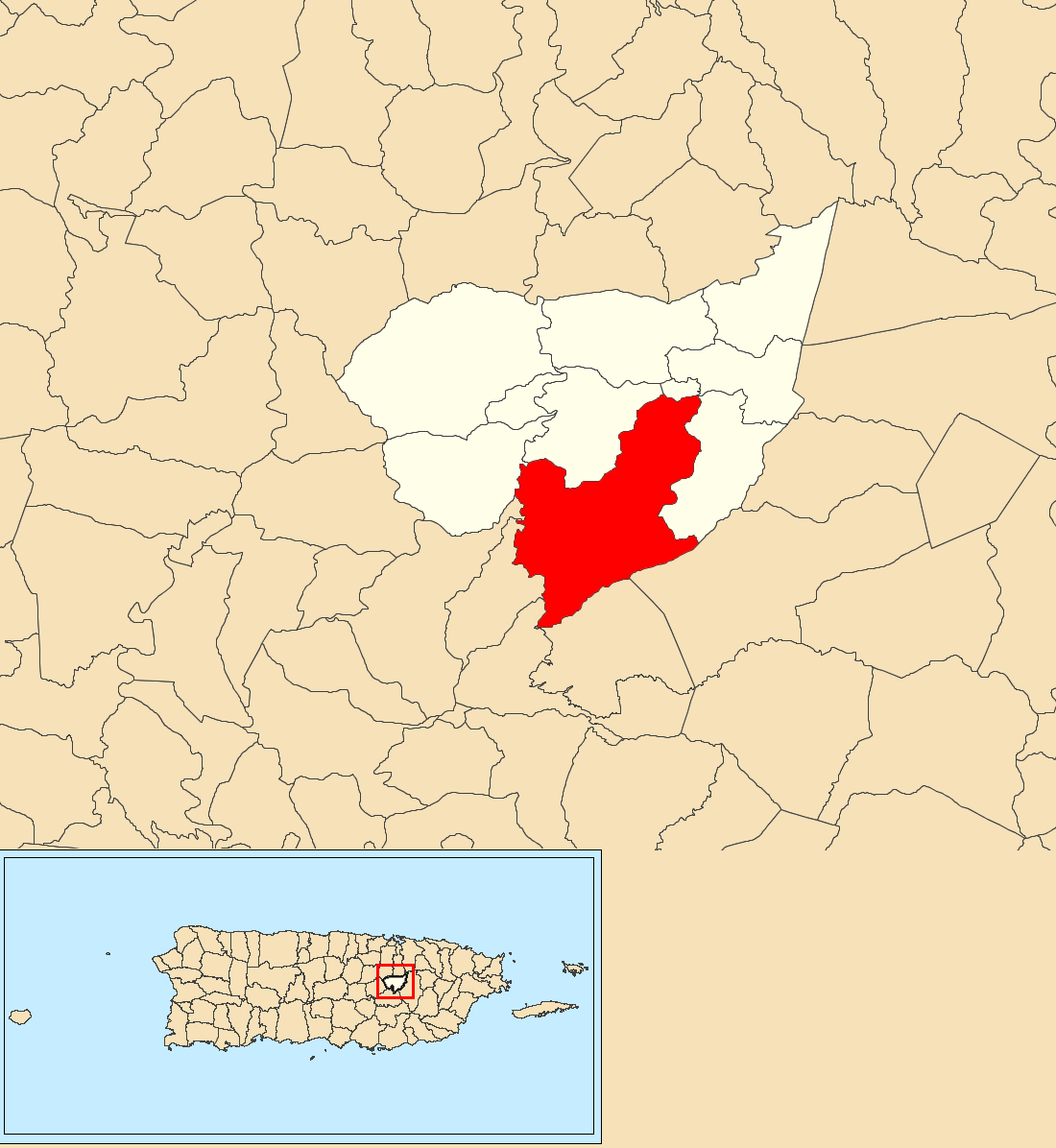
- Location of Sumidero within the municipality of Aguas Buenas shown in red

- Location of Puerto Rico
- Coordinates: 18°13′34″N 66°07′23″W
- Commonwealth: Puerto Rico
- Municipality: Aguas Buenas

Area
  - Total: 6.36 sq mi (16.5 km^{2})
  - Land: 6.36 sq mi (16.5 km^{2})
  - Water: 0.00 sq mi (0 km^{2})
- Elevation: 1,476 ft (450 m)

Population (2010)
  - Total: 8,008
  - Density: 1,259.1/sq mi (486.1/km^{2})
- Source: 2010 Census
- Time zone: UTC−4 (AST)
- ZIP Code: 00703
- Area code: 787/939

Sumidero is a barrio in the municipality of Aguas Buenas, Puerto Rico. Its population in 2010 was 8,008. In Sumidero barrio is part of the Aguas Buenas urban zone and the Santa Clara community.

== History ==
Sumidero was in Spain's gazetteers until Puerto Rico was ceded by Spain in the aftermath of the Spanish–American War under the terms of the Treaty of Paris of 1898 and became an unincorporated territory of the United States. In 1899, the United States Department of War conducted a census of Puerto Rico finding that the population of Sumidero barrio was 984.

Historical population
Census	Pop.	Note	%±
1900	984		—
1910	1,098		11.6%
1920	1,320		20.2%
1930	1,882		42.6%
1940	2,458		30.6%
1950	3,110		26.5%
1960	4,010		28.9%
1970	0		−100.0%
1980	5,981		—
1990	6,841		14.4%
2000	7,877		15.1%
2010	8,008		1.7%
U.S. Decennial Census; 1899 (shown as 1900) 1910-1930; 1930-1950 1980-2000 2010

== Special Communities ==
In 2001, law 1-2001 was passed to identify marginalized communities of Puerto Rico. In 2017, Governor Rosello created a new government agency to work with the Special Communities of Puerto Rico Program. Parcelas Santa Clara in Sumidero is one of the 742 places on the list of Comunidades Especiales de Puerto Rico.

== See also ==
- List of communities in Puerto Rico
