= Aguas Buenas, Puerto Rico =

Town and municipality in Puerto Rico

Aguas Buenas Municipio Autónomo de Aguas Buenas
- Town and Municipality
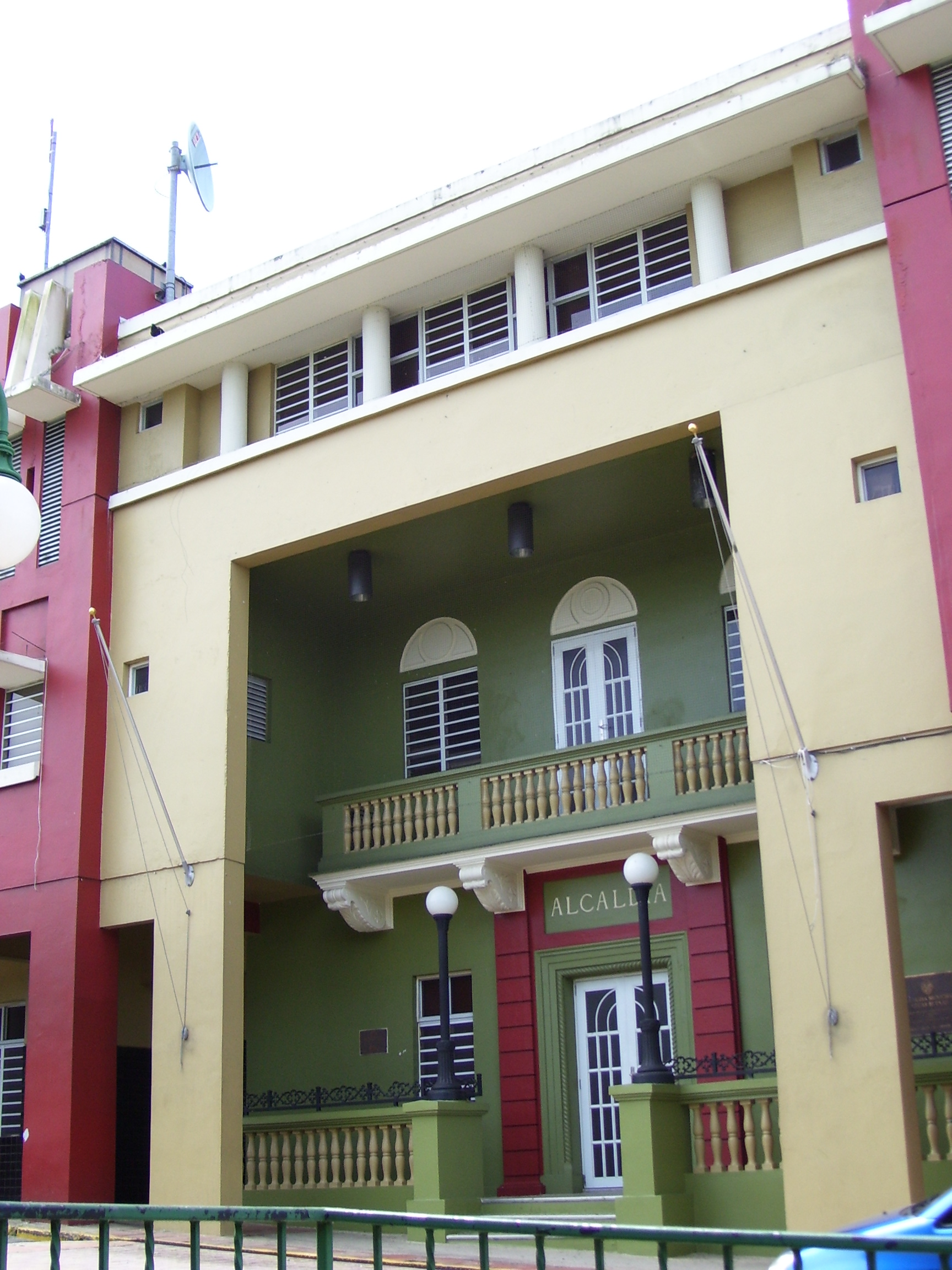
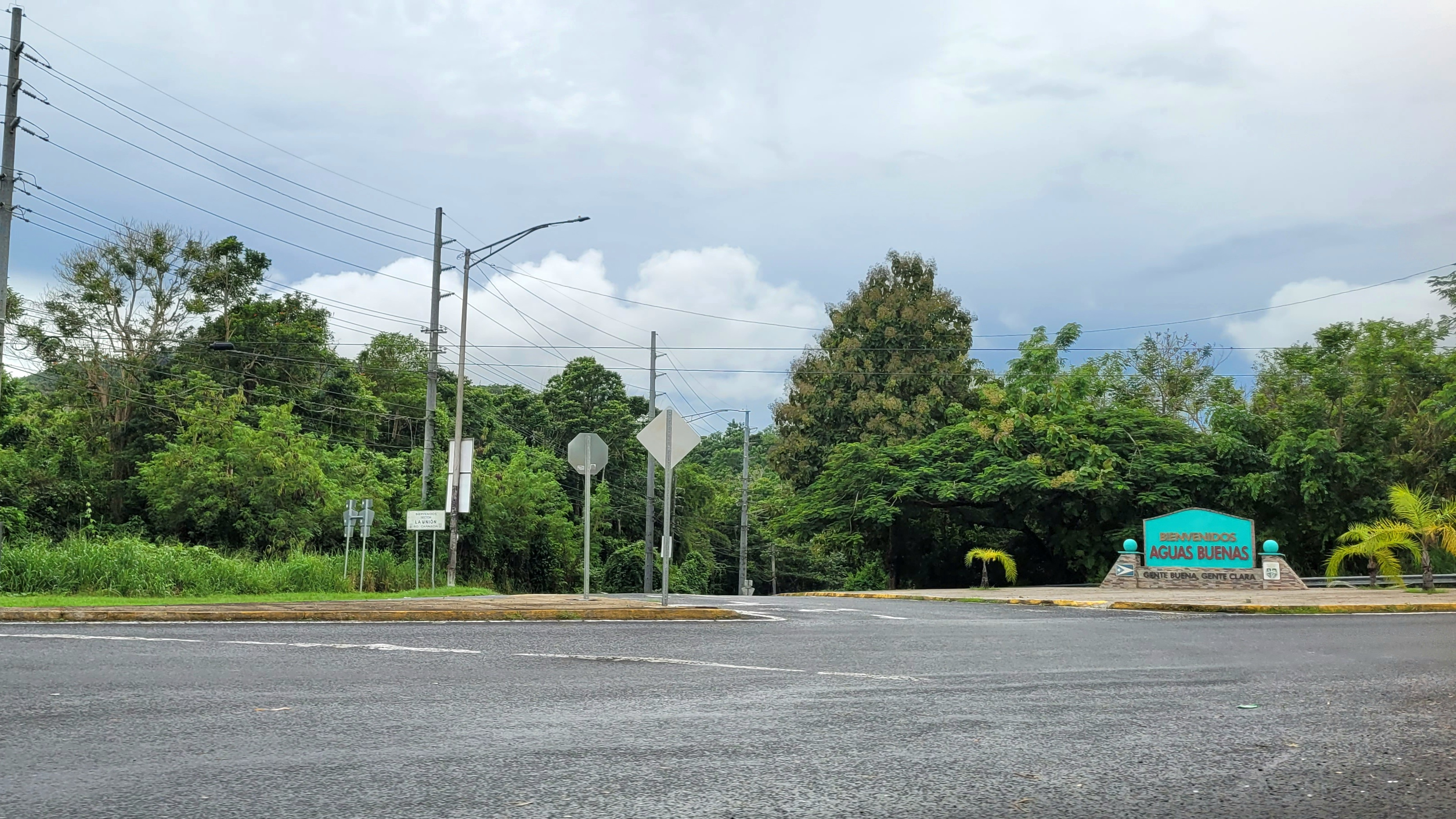
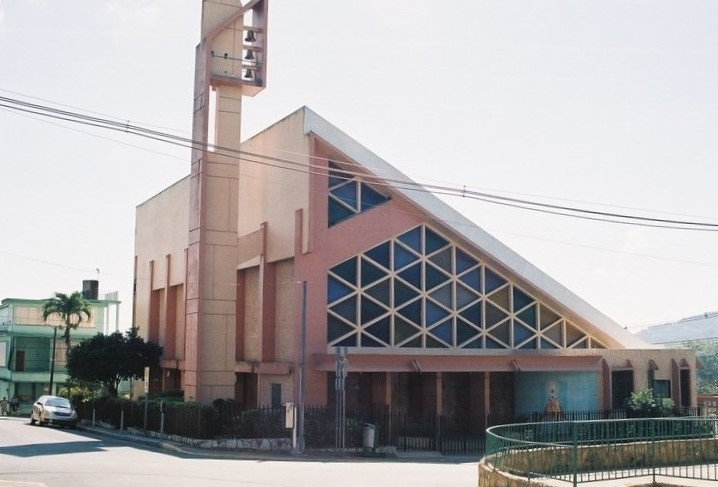
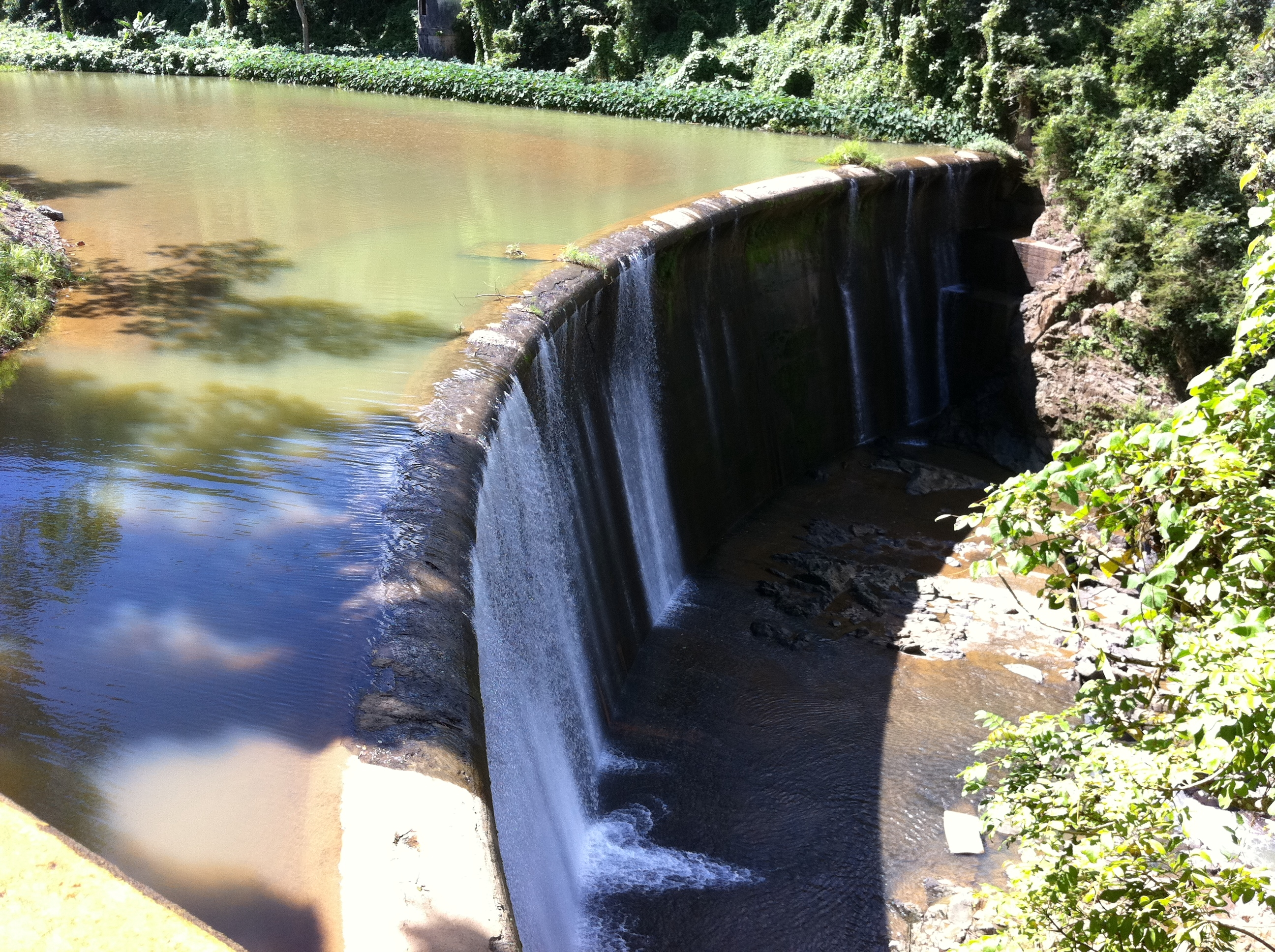
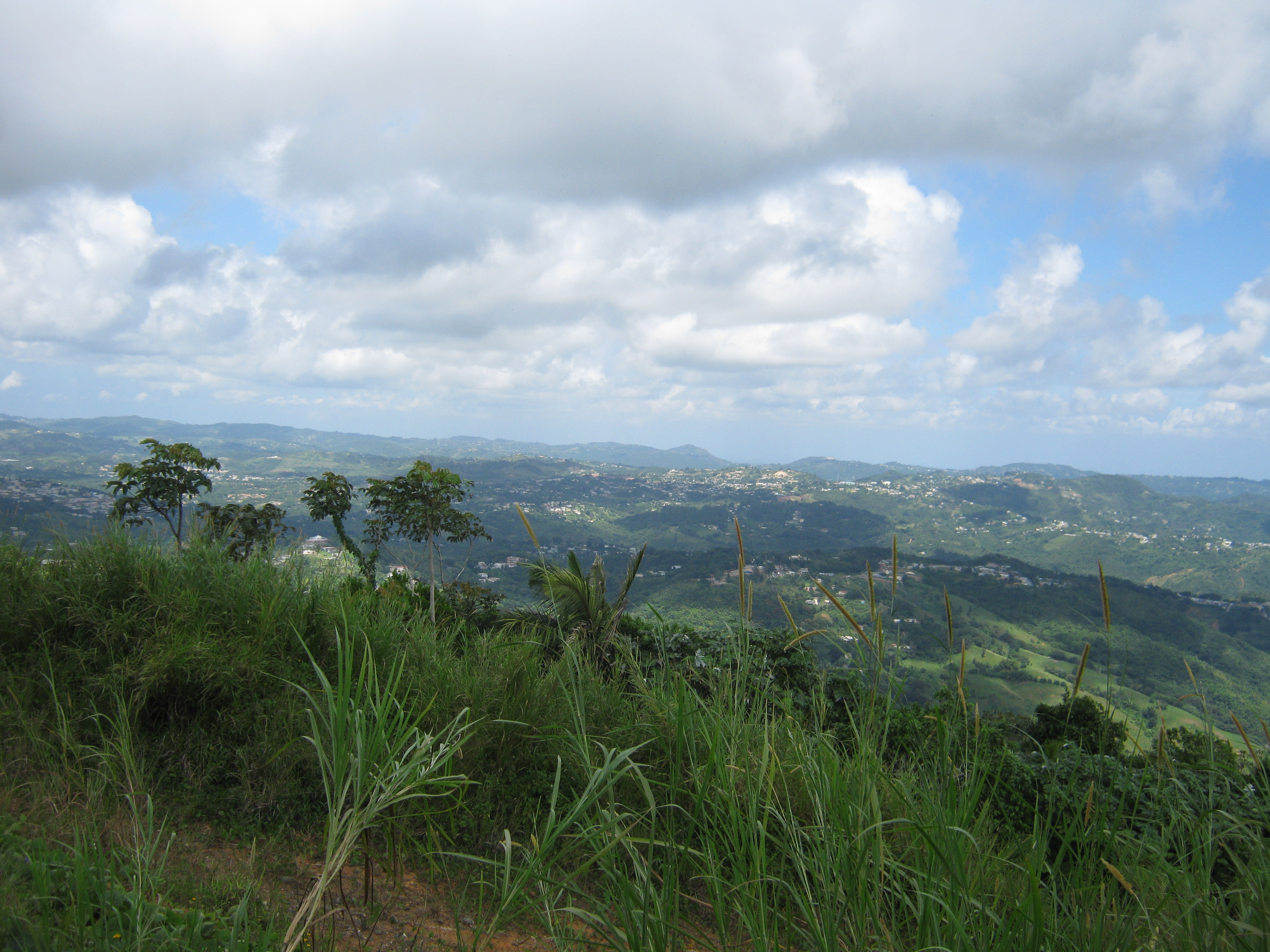
- Aguas Buenas City Hall Aguas Buenas town sign on Puerto Rico Highway 156 Los Tres Santos Reyes Church Rafael Nicolau Elementary School Aguas Buenas Bayamón River Dam Aguas Buenas from Cordillera Central foothills

- Flag Coat of arms
- Nicknames: La Ciudad de las Aguas Claras, Los Mulos, El Oasis de Puerto Rico, Los Ñocos
- Anthem: "Yo Soy Aguas Buenas"
- Map of Puerto Rico highlighting Aguas Buenas Municipality
- Coordinates: 18°15′25″N 66°06′11″W
- Sovereign state: United States
- Commonwealth: Puerto Rico
- Settled: 1798
- Founded: May 25, 1838
- Barrios: 10 barrios: Aguas Buenas barrio-pueblo; Bairoa; Bayamoncito; Cagüitas; Jagüeyes; Juan Asencio; Mula; Mulita; Sonadora; Sumidero

Government
  - Mayor: Karina Nieves Serrano (PNP)
  - Senatorial dist.: 1 – San Juan
  - Representative dist.: 5

Area
  - Total: 30.12 sq mi (78.01 km^{2})
  - Land: 30.12 sq mi (78.00 km^{2})
  - Water: 0.0039 sq mi (.01 km^{2})

Population (2020)
  - Total: 24,223
  - Estimate (2025): 22,838 ▼
  - Rank: 49th in Puerto Rico
  - Density: 804.3/sq mi (310.6/km^{2})
- Demonym: Aguasbonenses
- Time zone: UTC−4 (AST)
- ZIP Code: 00703
- Area code: 787/939
- Major routes: link: Puerto Rico Highway 174
- Website: http://legislaturaaguasbuenas.com/

Aguas Buenas (Spanish pronunciation: [ˈaɣwas ˈβwenas], locally [awaʔ ˈβwenaʔ]), is a town and municipality of Puerto Rico located in the central-east region of the main island in the foothills of the Central Mountain Range. Immediately outside the urban core of the San Juan metropolitan area, north of Cidra, south of Bayamón, Guaynabo and San Juan, east of Comerio, and north-west of Caguas, Aguas Buenas is spread over 9 barrios and the downtown area and administrative center of Aguas Buenas Pueblo. As of the 2020 census, it has a population of 24,223.

== Etymology and nicknames ==
The name Aguas Buenas translates to "good waters". The town's and municipality's original names were Aguabuena ("good water"), originally a barrio or district of Caguas, and Aguas Claras ("clear waters"). These names and some of the municipality's nicknames such as Ciudad de las Aguas Claras ("city of clear waters") and Oasis de Puerto Rico ("Puerto Rico's oasis") are a reference to the number of natural water springs that can be found in the municipality, particularly those founds around the Aguas Buenas Cave and Caverns System Nature Reserve (Spanish: Reserva Natural Sistema de Cuevas y Cavernas de Aguas Buenas). Citizens and residents of Aguas Buenas are referred to as aguasbonenses and sometimes as Mulos ("mules") or Ñocos ("amputees").

== History ==
Aguas Buenas was originally a sector of Caguas known as Aguabuena. In 1798, a group of residents started establishing their houses near some of the rivers in the area and started calling the sector Aguas Claras.

The quantity of residents incremented with time and on July 25, 1832, they organized a meeting and commissioned Francisco de Salas Torres and Ramón Díaz to do the necessary arrangements for the region to be declared a municipality. A resident, Julian López, offered part of his estate to be used for the construction of a town square, a church, the city hall, and the priest house.

The town was officially founded on May 25, 1838, and the name was changed to Aguas Buenas. Francisco de Salas Torres was declared the first mayor. Initially, the economy of the town relied on coffee plantations and commerce. At the end of the 19th century, the town's population was close to 7,000.

In 1906, mayor Don José E. Morales bought nearly six acres of terrain from Don Guillermo Díaz Delgado. In these lands, the sectors of La Pajilla, El Pueblito and El Guanábano were established, expanding the town's area.

The epicenter of the 2010 Aguas Buenas earthquake, popularly known as the Nochebuena Earthquake, was centered between the barrios Juan Asencio, Mulita and Sonadora.

Hurricane Maria on September 20, 2017, triggered numerous landslides in Aguas Buenas with the significant amount of rainfall. Between1,000 and 3,000 homes in Aguas Buenas were destroyed or suffered significant damage as a result of the hurricane. A year after the hurricane struck, many older residents refused to leave their damaged homes and continued to live in their homes, without a reconstructed roof, but with a blue tarp for a roof. The hurricane winds and rain damaged infrastructure and caused the entire electrical system to collapse.

== Geography ==
The terrain is moderately mountainous located in the northern edge of the Cayey mountain range (Sierra de Cayey), part of the Cordillera Central in Puerto Rico. The highest peaks are La Peña, Santa Bárbara, La Tisa, and La Marquesa.

=== Water features ===
Several rivers flow through Aguas Buenas. Some of them are the Bayamón River, and several small rivers that are part of the Río Grande de Loíza, like Bairoa, Caguitas, and Cañas.

=== Barrios ===
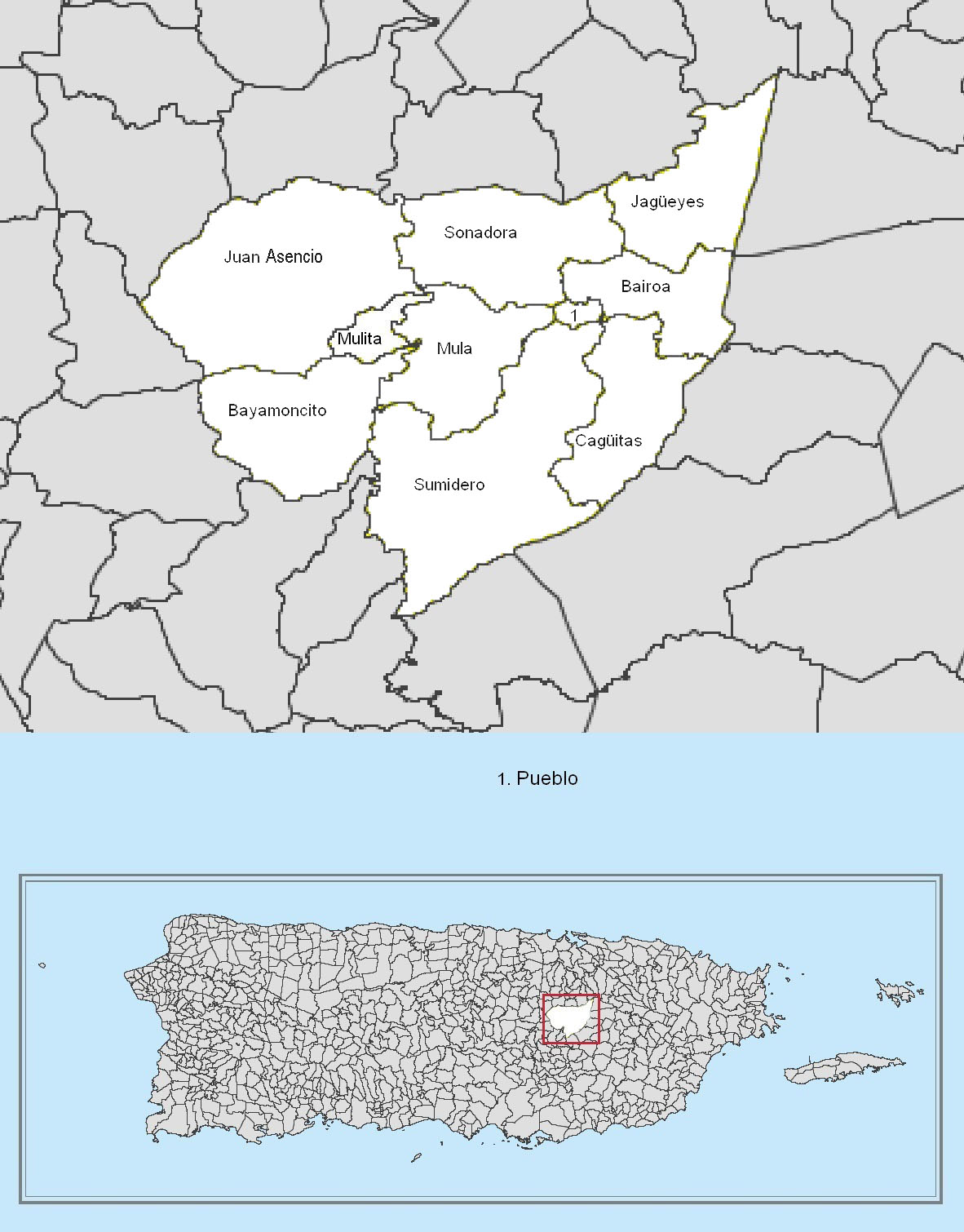
Subdivisions of Aguas Buenas.

Like all municipalities of Puerto Rico, Aguas Buenas is subdivided into barrios. The municipal buildings, central square and large Catholic church are located in a small barrio referred to as "el pueblo", near the center of the municipality.

1. Aguas Buenas barrio-pueblo
2. Bairoa
3. Bayamoncito
4. Cagüitas
5. Jagüeyes
6. Juan Asencio
7. Mula
8. Mulita
9. Sonadora
10. Sumidero

=== Sectors ===
Barrios (which are like minor civil divisions) and subbarrios, are further subdivided into smaller areas called sectores (sectors in English). The types of sectores may vary, from normally sector to urbanización to reparto to barriada to residencial, among others.

=== Special Communities ===
Comunidades Especiales de Puerto Rico (Special Communities of Puerto Rico) are marginalized communities whose citizens are experiencing a certain amount of social exclusion. A map shows these communities occur in nearly every municipality of the commonwealth. Of the 742 places that were on the list in 2014, the following barrios, communities, sectors, or neighborhoods were in Aguas Buenas: Vázquez neighborhood, Las Parcelas in Bayamoncito barrio, Sonadora barrio, Cagüitas Centro, Pajilla sector in Centro Urbano, Jagüeyes Abajo, Las Corujas, and Parcelas Santa Clara in Sumidero barrio.

== Tourism ==
Some of the landmarks and places of interest in Aguas Buenas are located in its town square. Places of interest in Aguas Buenas include:

- Finca Artesanal
- La Charca Recreational Center
- Aguas Buenas Caves
- El Mirador Walkway
- Luis A. Ferré Plaza (main square of the downtown area)
- City Hall
- Lecture House
- Christ Redeemer House
- Jagüeyes Country Club
- Monte La Tiza
- Maximiliano Merced fire station
- Juan Nieves Cotto baseball park
- Holy Spirit parish

To stimulate local tourism during the COVID-19 pandemic in Puerto Rico, the Puerto Rico Tourism Company launched the Voy Turistiendo (I'm Touring) campaign in 2021. The campaign featured a passport book with a page for each municipality. The Voy Turisteando Aguas Buenas passport page lists Viva La Cosecha (agritourism), Hacienda Cascada (agritourism), Centro Recreativo La Charca, and Paseo Mirador as places of interest.

== Culture ==
=== Sports ===
Aguas Buenas has an amateur baseball team called Los Tigres de Aguas Buenas.

=== Festivals and events ===
Aguas Buenas celebrates its patron saint festival in September. The Fiestas Patronales Nuestra Señora de la Monserrate is a religious and cultural celebration that generally features parades, games, artisans, amusement rides, regional food, and live entertainment.

Other festivals and events celebrated in Aguas Buenas include the Salsa, Bomba & Plena Festival held in late summer, an Agricultural festival held in May and the Festival Folklórico de Campo y Pueblo held in January. An annual Carnival is held in March.

== Economy ==
After its foundation, the economy of Aguas Buenas relied mostly on coffee plantations.

== Demographics ==
Historical population
Census	Pop.	Note	%±
1900	7,977		—
1910	8,292		3.9%
1920	10,741		29.5%
1930	12,885		20.0%
1940	14,671		13.9%
1950	15,565		6.1%
1960	17,034		9.4%
1970	18,600		9.2%
1980	22,429		20.6%
1990	25,424		13.4%
2000	29,032		14.2%
2010	28,659		−1.3%
2020	24,223		−15.5%
2025 (est.)	22,838	▼	−5.7%
U.S. Decennial Census; 1899 (shown as 1900) 1910–1930; 1930–1950 1960–2000 2010 2020

Total Population	24,223
Population by Sex/Age	
Male	14,047
Female	14,612
Under 18	7,185
18 & over	21,474
20–24	1,962
25–34	3,953
35–49	5,572
50–64	5,352
65 & over	3,787
Population by Ethnicity	
Hispanic or Latino	24,223
Non Hispanic or Latino	146
Population by Race	
White	20,770
African American	3,604
Asian	25
American Indian and Alaska Native	178
Native Hawaiian and Pacific Islander	5
Other	2,781
Identified by two or more	1,296

According to the 2020 census, Aguas Buenas has a population of 24,223. This represents a decline of 15.5% or over 4,000 inhabitants in comparison to the 2010 census.

According to the 2010 Census, 72.5% of the population identifies themselves as White, and 12.6% as African-American. Also, according to the census, the population is equally divided by gender (49% are males, while 51% are females). Finally, 25% of the population is under 18 years old. The next biggest percentage of population (19.4%) is between 35 and 49 years old.

== Government ==
All municipalities in Puerto Rico are administered by a mayor, elected every four years. The current mayor of Aguas Buenas is Javier García Pérez, of the New Progressive Party (PNP). He was elected at the 2016 general elections. However, on May 5, 2022, García Pérez was arrested by the FBI on corruption, bribery, and extortion charges. and was subsequently removed from his position.

Since 2011, the city belongs to the Puerto Rico Senatorial district I, which is represented by two Senators. In 2012, José Nadal Power and Ramón Luis Nieves were elected as District Senators.

=== Mayors ===
The following have been the Mayors of the Aguas Buenas Municipality, from its foundation to the present:

Years	Mayor	Years	Mayor
1838–1841	Francisco de Salas Torres	1903–1904	Jacobo Córdova
1841	Miguel Díaz	1904–1909	José E. Morales Díaz
1841–1843	José Mariano Benítez	1909–1911	Carlos Muñoz Díaz
1843	Miguel Díaz	1911–1913	José G. López Alvarado
1842–1846	José Manuel de la Vega	1913–1917	José E. Morales Díaz
1846–1848	Marcos Díaz	1918–1927	Enrique Lizardi
1848–1850	Manuel Otero	1927	José G. Sánchez
1848–1856	Manuel Otero	1927–1929	Alfredo Disdier Pacheco
1856	Valentín Pérez	1929–1933	José G. López Ferrer (Rafael)
1856–1857	Isidoro García	1933–1937	Rafael González López
1857	Valentín Pérez	1937–1940	Pedro G. López
1857–1859	José Tomás de Sarraga	1940–1944	Rafael González López PPD
1859	Valentín Pérez	1944–1948	Rafael Batalla Reyes PER
1859	Tomás Paz	1948–1956	Miran Carrasquillo Cartagena PPD
1859	Buenaventura de las Barcenas	1956–1960	Ramón López Batalla PPD
1859	Valentín Pérez	1960–1964	Ángel Rivera Rodríguez PPD
1859–1862	Manuel Boscana Guillermetty	1965–1972	Ángel T. Arroyo García PPD
1860	Valentín Pérez	1972–1980	Gregorio Torres Velásquez PPD
1862	Santiago Pereira	1981–1988	Gudelio Díaz Morales PPD
1862–1867	Juan Eugenio Vizcarrondo	1989–1999	Carlos Aponte Silva PNP
1867–1898	José Martínez Balasquides	1999– 2004	Buenaventura Dávila Roldán PNP
1867–1898	Agustin J. Díaz	2004–2016	Luis Arroyo Chiqués PPD
1898–1902	Buenaventura Díaz	2016–2022	Javier García Pérez PNP
1903	Pío Rechani	2022–present	Karina Nieves Serrano PNP

== Symbols ==
The municipio has an official flag and coat of arms.

=== Flag ===
The flag of Aguas Buenas features a blue triangle with the base at the hoist. The triangle has a solitary white star, like the national banner. A second triangle appears interposed with the first one, in yellow, with its point reaching the other end of the flag. The main field of the flag, under both triangles, is color green.

=== Coat of arms ===
Designed by Francisco Diaz Rivera in 1975, the coat of arms features a four-paneled shield. The upper left panel shows the Virgin of Monserrate, while the upper right panel features a Taíno, a symbol of the original inhabitants of this region. At the bottom right panel, lies a cornucopia containing the native fruit of Aguas Buenas. This panel represents how the agriculture was the primary source of income for the town. In the lower left panel, there are four maracas and a güicharo, typical instruments of the "jibaros" of Aguas Buenas and Puerto Rico. The crown, as with other municipalities of Puerto Rico, consists of three towers.

=== Anthem ===
Bajo el azul del cielo de mi patria

En el oriente de la Cordillera

Aguasbonenses forjando la historia

Defendiendo el honor de su bandera.

De sol a sol sembrando nuestros frutos

El orgullo labrado en nuestra tierra

La siega de un futuro va anunciando

El brillo de la solitaria estrella.

Que se levanta en medio del combate

Por negarse a ser solo una quimera

Raices firmes que en el pecho laten

Afirmando la patria y la conciencia.

Aguas Buenas, estirpe de valientes

Pedazo del terruño borinqueño

Un pueblo que se une en la conquista

De lo que es ser un buen puertorriqueño.

Yo soy Aguas Buenas!

== Transportation ==
To reach the town of Aguas Buenas, visitors must take the Puerto Rico Highway 52 to the city of Caguas. From there, PR-156 leads directly into the downtown square. Other minor roads lead to nearby towns such as Comerío.

There are 13 bridges in Aguas Buenas.

== Education ==
There are around 14 public schools in Aguas Buenas. As with all other municipalities, education is handled by the Puerto Rico Department of Education. These are divided as follows:

Elementary Schools

- Dr. Gustavo Muñoz Díaz
- Ezequiel Ramos La Santa
- Jagüeyes Abajo
- José R. González
- Luis Santaella
- Luis T. Baliñas
- Mulitas Alvelo
- Ramón Luis Rivera/Juan Asencio
- Santa Clara

Junior High Schools

- Dr. Pedro Albizu Campos
- Luis Muñoz Marín
- Su Bayamoncito
- Su Sumidero

High Schools

- Josefa Pastrana

== Notable people ==
- Joyce Giraud – Actress and Miss Puerto Rico 1998
- Ismael Cruz Córdova, actor

== See also ==
- List of Puerto Ricans
- History of Puerto Rico
