= Bairoa, Aguas Buenas, Puerto Rico =

Barrio of Puerto Rico

Bairoa
- Barrio
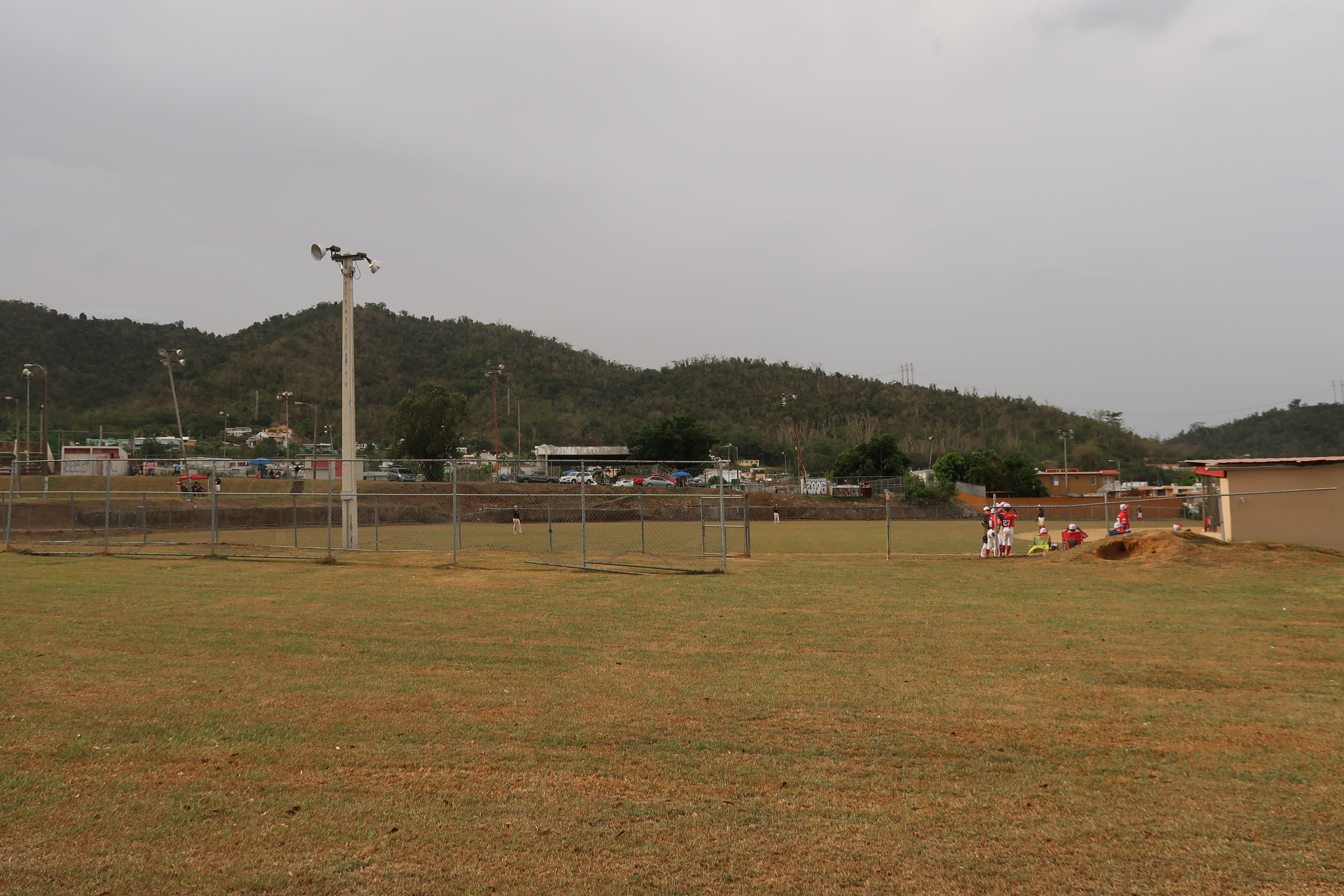
- Park in Bairoa

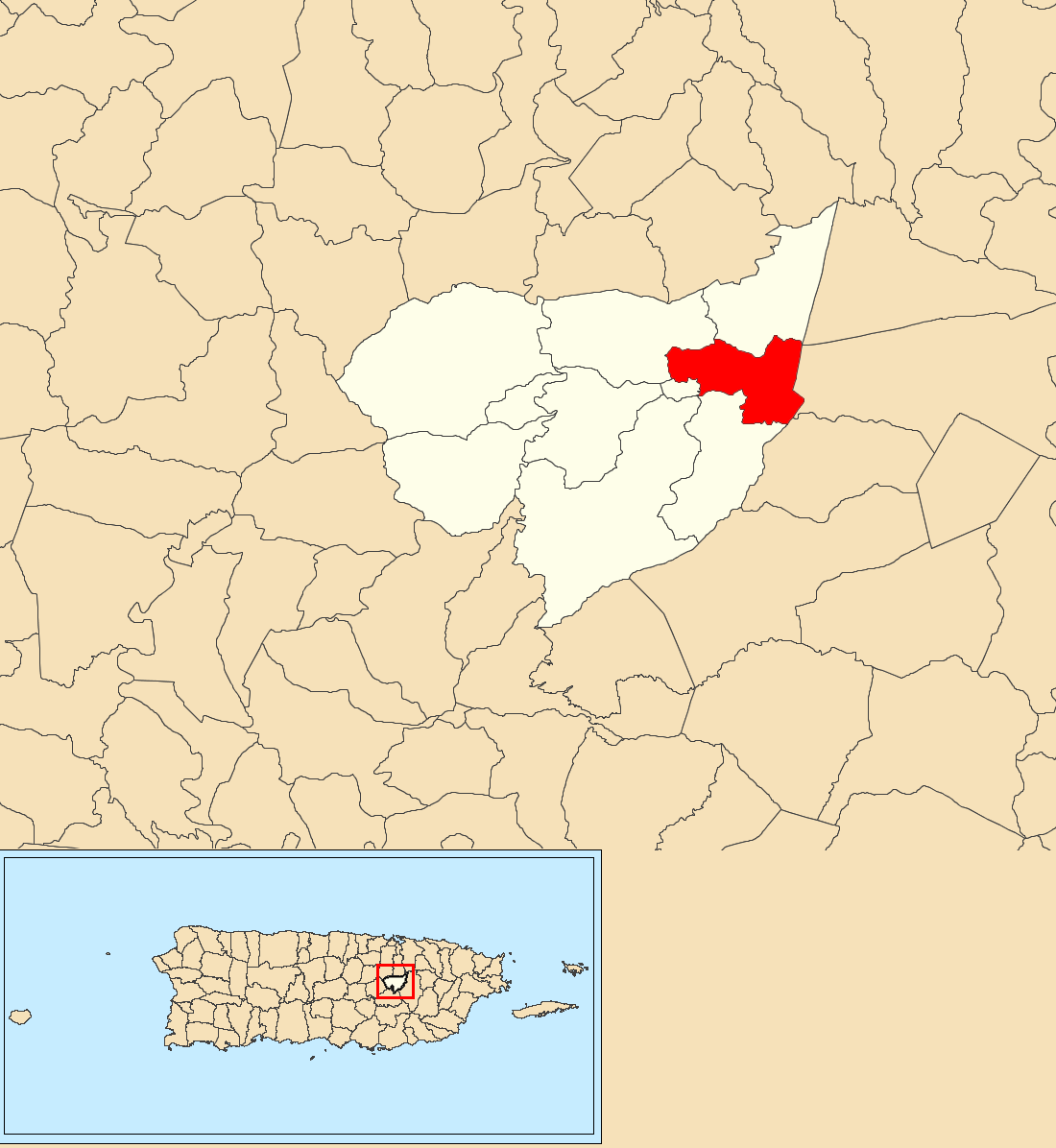
- Location of Bairoa within the municipality of Aguas Buenas shown in red

- Location of Puerto Rico
- Coordinates: 18°15′49″N 66°05′02″W
- Commonwealth: Puerto Rico
- Municipality: Aguas Buenas

Area
  - Total: 2.01 sq mi (5.2 km^{2})
  - Land: 2.01 sq mi (5.2 km^{2})
  - Water: 0.00 sq mi (0 km^{2})
- Elevation: 600 ft (180 m)

Population (2010)
  - Total: 2,444
  - Density: 1,215.9/sq mi (469.5/km^{2})
- Source: 2010 Census
- Time zone: UTC−4 (AST)
- ZIP Code: 00703
- Area code: 787/939

Bairoa is a barrio in the municipality of Aguas Buenas, Puerto Rico. Its population in 2010 was 2,444. In Bairoa barrio is part of the Aguas Buenas urban zone.

== History ==
Bairoa was in Spain's gazetteers until Puerto Rico was ceded by Spain in the aftermath of the Spanish–American War under the terms of the Treaty of Paris of 1898 and became an unincorporated territory of the United States. In 1899, the United States Department of War conducted a census of Puerto Rico finding that the combined population of Jagüeyes and Bairoa barrios was 1,099.

Historical population
| Census | Pop. | Note | %± |
|---|---|---|---|
| 1910 | 577 | | — |
| 1920 | 746 | | 29.3% |
| 1930 | 847 | | 13.5% |
| 1940 | 921 | | 8.7% |
| 1950 | 1,155 | | 25.4% |
| 1960 | 1,466 | | 26.9% |
| 1970 | 0 | | −100.0% |
| 1980 | 1,923 | | — |
| 1990 | 2,161 | | 12.4% |
| 2000 | 2,448 | | 13.3% |
| 2010 | 2,444 | | −0.2% |
U.S. Decennial Census; 1900 (N/A) 1910-1930; 1930-1950 1980-2000 2010

== See also ==
- List of communities in Puerto Rico
