= Sonadora, Aguas Buenas, Puerto Rico =

Barrio of Puerto Rico

Sonadora
- Barrio
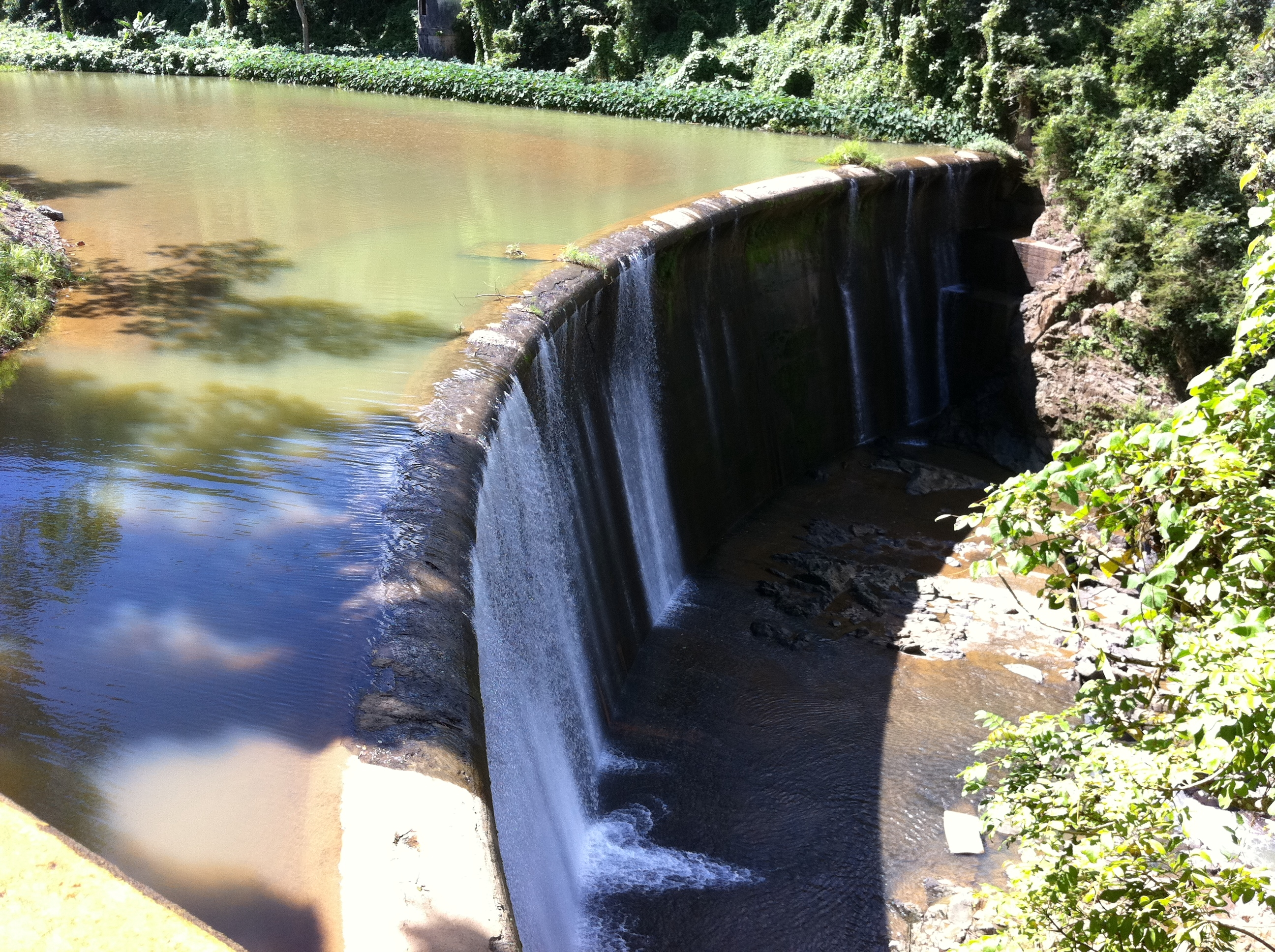
- Dam in Sonadora, Aguas Buenas

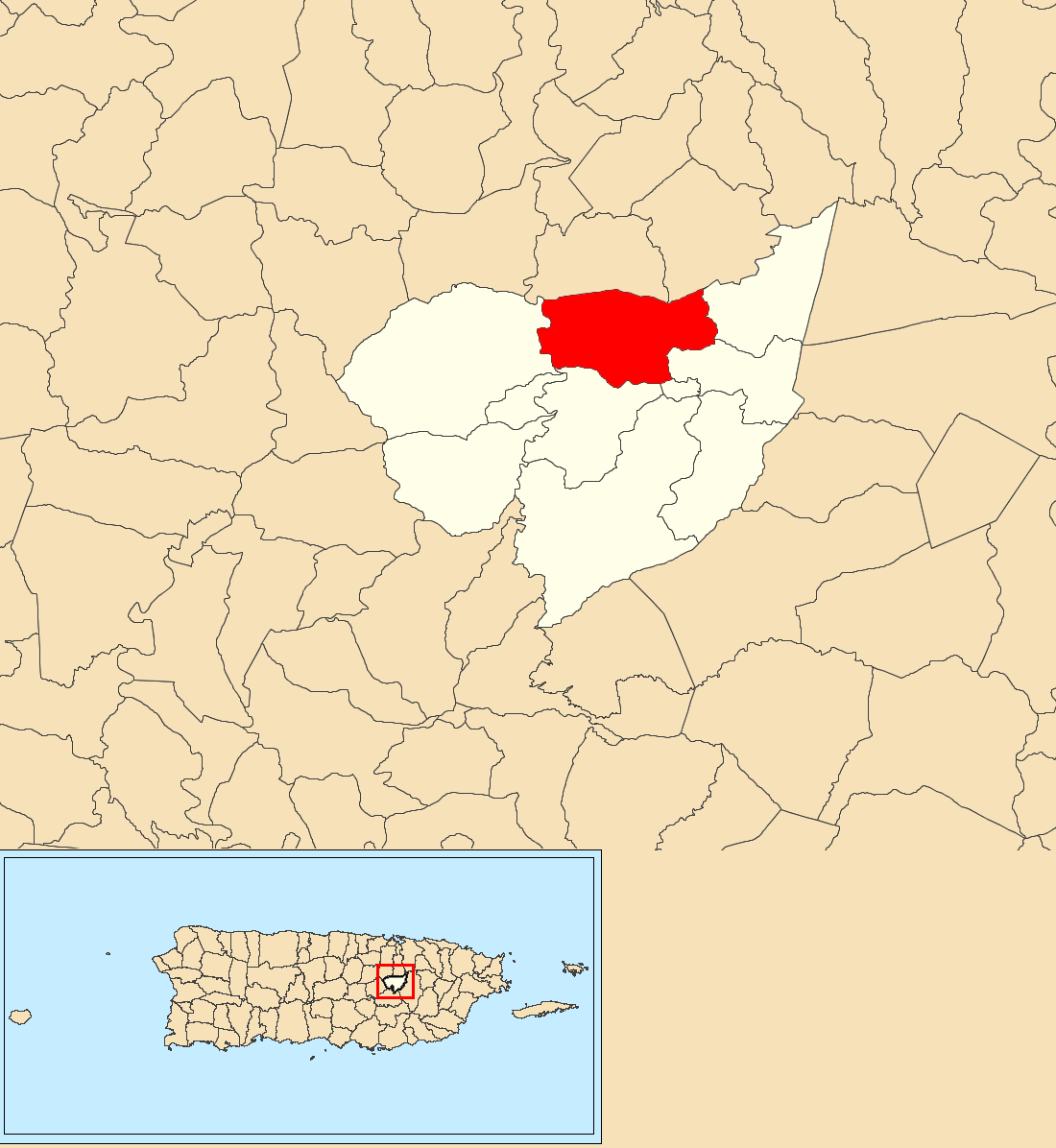
- Location of Sonadora within the municipality of Aguas Buenas shown in red

- Location of Puerto Rico
- Coordinates: 18°16′23″N 66°07′11″W
- Commonwealth: Puerto Rico
- Municipality: Aguas Buenas

Area
  - Total: 3.4 sq mi (8.8 km^{2})
  - Land: 3.4 sq mi (8.8 km^{2})
  - Water: 0.0 sq mi (0 km^{2})
- Elevation: 1,207 ft (368 m)

Population (2010)
  - Total: 3,191
  - Density: 938.5/sq mi (362.4/km^{2})
- Source: 2010 Census
- Time zone: UTC−4 (AST)
- ZIP Code: 00703
- Area code: 787/939

Sonadora is a barrio in the municipality of Aguas Buenas, Puerto Rico. Its population in 2010 was 3,191. In Sonadora barrio is part of the Aguas Buenas urban zone.

== History ==
Sonadora was in Spain's gazetteers until Puerto Rico was ceded by Spain in the aftermath of the Spanish–American War under the terms of the Treaty of Paris of 1898 and became an unincorporated territory of the United States. In 1899, the United States Department of War conducted a census of Puerto Rico finding that the combined population of Sonadora and Mula barrio was 1,183.

Historical population
| Census | Pop. | Note | %± |
|---|---|---|---|
| 1910 | 573 | | — |
| 1920 | 839 | | 46.4% |
| 1930 | 1,031 | | 22.9% |
| 1940 | 1,223 | | 18.6% |
| 1950 | 1,402 | | 14.6% |
| 1960 | 1,611 | | 14.9% |
| 1970 | 1,947 | | 20.9% |
| 1980 | 2,009 | | 3.2% |
| 1990 | 2,432 | | 21.1% |
| 2000 | 2,845 | | 17.0% |
| 2010 | 3,191 | | 12.2% |
U.S. Decennial Census; 1900 (N/A) 1910-1930; 1930-1950 1980-2000 2010

== Special Communities ==
In 2001, law 1-2001 was passed to identify marginalized communities of Puerto Rico. In 2017, Governor Rosello created a new government agency to work with the Special Communities of Puerto Rico Program. Sonadora is one of the 742 places on the list of Comunidades Especiales de Puerto Rico.

== See also ==
- List of communities in Puerto Rico
