= List of barrios and sectors of Comerío, Puerto Rico =

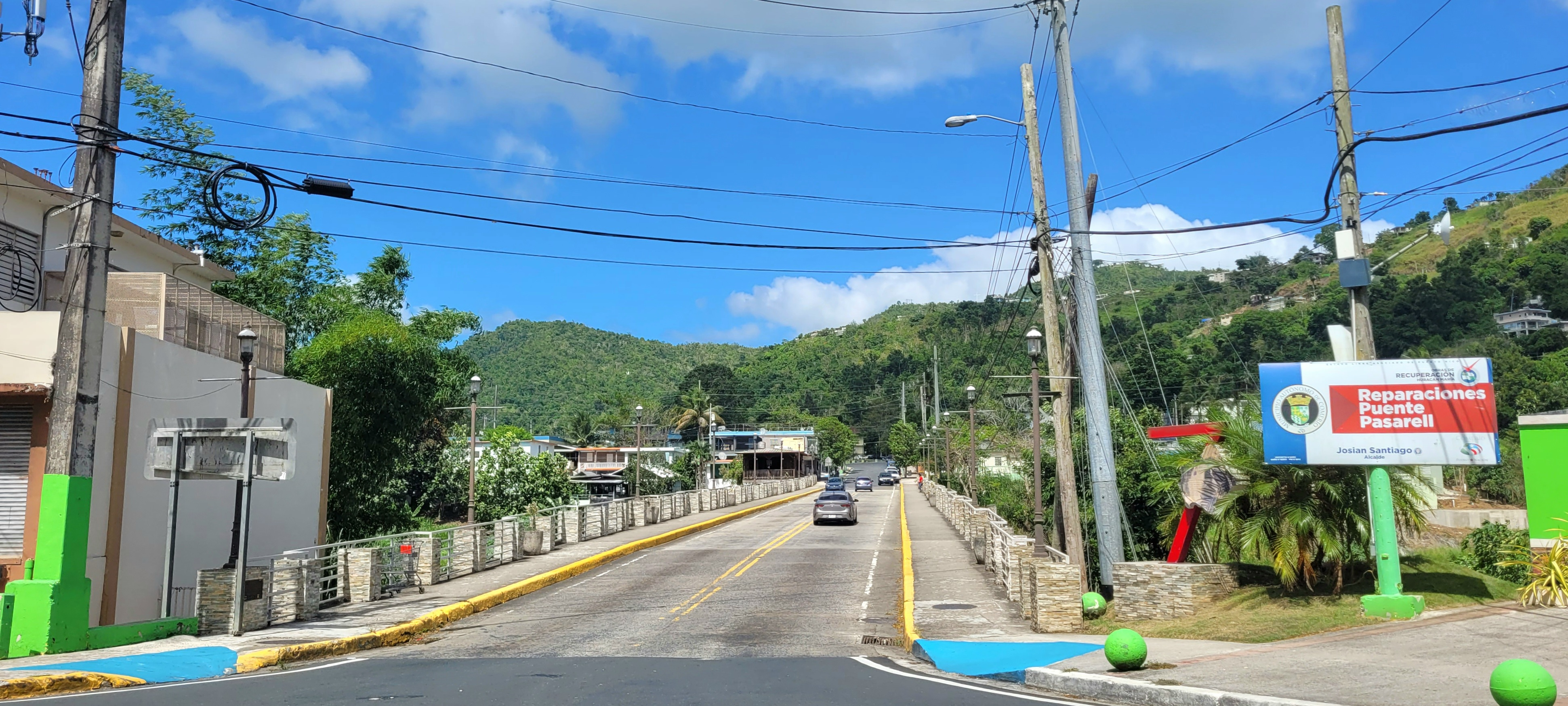
PR-7778 in Comerío

Like all municipalities of Puerto Rico, Comerío is subdivided into administrative units called barrios, which are, in contemporary times, roughly comparable to minor civil divisions. The barrios and subbarrios, in turn, are further subdivided into smaller local populated place areas/units called sectores (sectors in English). The types of sectores may vary, from normally sector to urbanización to reparto to barriada to residencial, among others. Some sectors appear in two barrios.

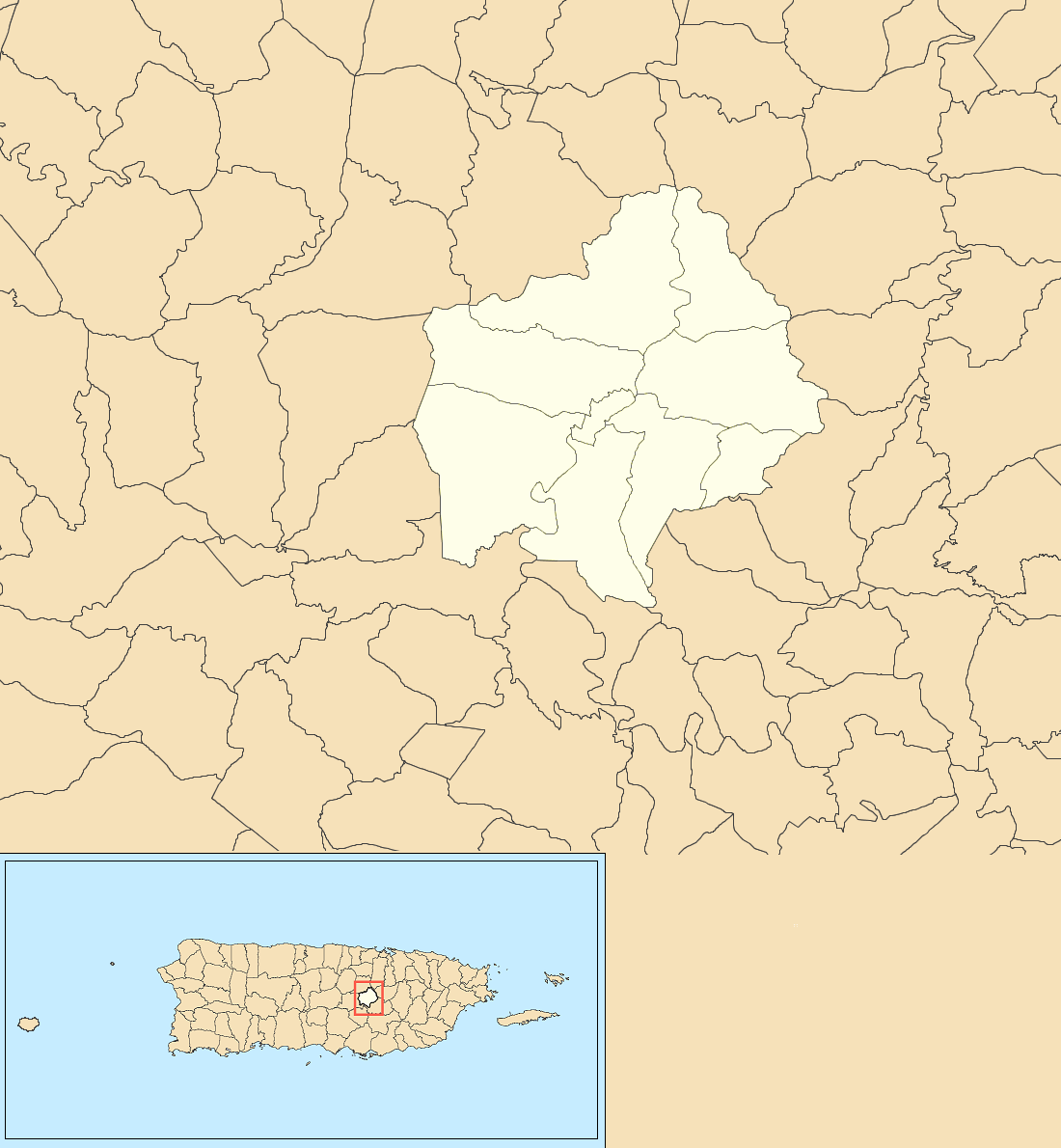
Comerío map

== List of sectors by barrio ==
=== Cedrito ===
- Sector Baudilio Torres
- Sector Capilla
- Sector La Prieta
- Sector La Tiza
- Sector Los Hernández
- Sector Los Valenes
- Sector Meléndez
- Sector Parcelas
- Sector Rabo de Buey
- Sector Toño Ayala

=== Cejas ===
- Sector Justo Rivera
- Sector Los Vicentes

=== Comerío barrio-pueblo ===
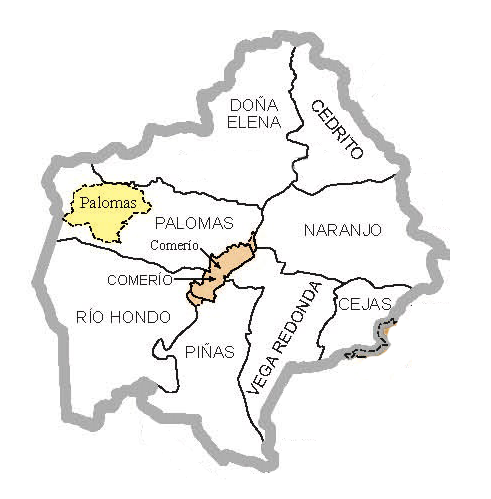
Map of Comerío

- Área Industrial
- Barriada Cielito
- Barriada Pasarell
- Calle Acueducto
- Carretera 778
- Casco del Pueblo
- Condominios Monte Flor
- Cuba Libre
- La Aldea
- Las Nereidas
- Palomas Abajo
- Parts of Puerto Rico Highway 167
- Residencial Ariel
- Residencial Manuel Martorell
- Sector 110
- Sector Cipey
- Sector El 26
- Sector Higüero
- Sector La Loma
- Sector Las Casitas
- Sector Lazos
- Sector Paloma Abajo
- Sector Villegas
- Sector Vuelta del Dos
- Urbanización Ariel
- Urbanización Río Plata
- Villa Monsito

=== Doña Elena ===
- Doña Elena Abajo
- Parts of Carretera 780, Ramal 7780 and Ramal 8809
- Sector Ayala
- Sector Bermúdez
- Sector El Salto
- Sector Figueroa
- Sector Iglesia
- Sector La Cocora
- Sector La Línea
- Sector La Loma
- Sector La Tosca (Carretera815)
- Sector Los Martínez
- Sector Los Perniles
- Sector Los Pinos
- Sector Media Luna
- Sector Parcelas
- Sector Puente Las Palomas
- Sector Villas de Doña Elena

=== Naranjo ===
- Carretera 156
- Carretera 791
- Comunidad Naranjo
- Hogar Comerío Home Care
- Parcelas El Verde
- Parts of Puerto Rico Highway 172
- Pueblo Viejo
- Punta Brava
- Sector El Punto
- Sector El Verde I
- Sector El Verde II
- Sector Escuela
- Sector La Virgencita
- Sector Montañez
- Sector Sabana
- Urbanización Hacienda Campo Bello
- Urbanización Vista Verde

=== Palomas ===
- Condominios Brisas de la Sierra
- Egda. Golden Living
- Las Bocas
- Palomas Abajo
- Parcelas Nuevas y Viejas
- Parts of Carretera 780
- Sector Caimito
- Sector Calderón
- Sector Capilla
- Sector Concho
- Sector El Guareto
- Sector El Mangó
- Sector Escuela
- Sector La Prá
- Sector Los Chuchitos
- Sector Los Liberales
- Sector Los Oyola
- Sector Los Vidrios
- Sector Manuel Espina
- Sector Manuel Reyes
- Sector Negrón (R-809)
- Sector Ortiz
- Sector Padilla
- Sector Quiles
- Sector Rincón
- Sector Romero
- Sector Solís
- Sector Zamora
- Urbanización San Andrés
- Vuelta del Dos

=== Piñas ===
- Barriada La Plata
- Hogar Hacienda El Trovador
- Parts of Carretera 775
- Parts of Carretera 7774
- Paseo de La Mora
- Reparto Jesús Acosta
- Sector Gabriel López
- Sector La Frontera
- Sector La Mora
- Sector Las Posas
- Sector Parcelas
- Sector Viento Caliente
- Sector Villa Brava (Piñas Abajo)
- Urbanización La Hacienda

=== Río Hondo ===
- Carretera R774
- Carretera R-776
- Comerío Elderly
- Sector Bordones
- Sector El Llano
- Sector El Tigre
- Sector La Guitarra
- Sector La Juncia
- Sector La Loma
- Sector La Paila
- Sector La Puntilla
- Sector Los Ocasio
- Sector Los Ruiz
- Sector Parcelas
- Sector Quebrada Grande
- Urbanización Sabana del Palmar

=== Vega Redonda ===
- Apartamentos Amelia
- Apartamentos El Español
- Carretera 791
- Sector La Mora Arriba
- Sector Las Polleras
- Sector Los Reyes
- Sector Quebrada Adentro
- Sector Sabana

== See also ==
- List of communities in Puerto Rico
