= Las Bocas Canyon =

Gorge forming part of the La Plata River basin in Cordillera Central, Puerto Rico

Las Bocas Canyon (Spanish: Cañón Las Bocas) is a steep gorge carved by the Frío River, located on the town boundary between the municipalities of Barranquitas and Comerío in the central region of the main island of Puerto Rico. Situated between the eponymous main subrange of Cordillera Central and the Sierra de Cayey subrange, it is notable for its untouched forests and the large population of kapok (Ceiba pentandra). Las Bocas, along with San Cristóbal Canyon, its larger neighbor to its immediate south, form part of the La Plata River basin.

== Protection ==
The canyon is protected as Las Bocas Canyon Protected Natural Area and Nature Reserve (Área Natural Protegida y Reserva Natural Cañón Las Bocas), a 1,170.98-acre (1,205.68 cuerdas) tract of land created through the Las Bocas Canyon Natural Reserve Committee (Comité Pro Reserva Natural Cañón Las Bocas) across the Quebradillas and Quebrada Grande barrios of Barranquitas and the Río Hondo and Palomas barrios of Comerío. Las Bocas is currently threatened geologically by nearby uncontrolled urban and hydrological developments, particularly due to its proximity to Comerío Pueblo, and ecologically by the use of pesticides in the agriculture of nearby Barranquitas. Organizations such as Sierra Club often offer guided hiking tours into the canyon.

=== Flora and fauna ===
The canyon is famous for its ceibas or kapoks, one of which is La Ceiba Acostada, famous for its F-shape and for its age, estimated to be at least 300 years old. In addition to the famous ceibas, the plant population of the canyon includes those common in both primary and secondary forests of the Cordillera Central such as the moca (Andira inermis), bucayo (Erythrina fusca), yagrumo macho (Didymopanax morototoni) and yagrumo hembra (Cecropia peltata). The area is considered a "natural aviary" due to its high diversity of birds, and it also contains one of the highest population densities of the Puerto Rican boa (Chilabothrus inornatus), particularly along the area of Piedra Blanca and the steeper cliffs of the canyon where they feed on bats and smaller reptiles. Another natural feature of the canyon is its natural bioluminescence, found in the form of bioluminescent fungi and the luminous click beetle or cucubano (Ignelater luminosus).

== See also ==
- Geography of Puerto Rico
- Geology of Puerto Rico
- List of protected areas of Puerto Rico
