= Lalah =

Lalah may refer to:

- Eulaulah Lalah Hathaway (born 1968), American singer, songwriter and music producer
- Lalah (Puerto Rican singer), singer and songwriter Alana Del Mar Gómez (born 2001)
