= Enrique Pérez Santiago =

First Puerto Rican hematologist

Dr. Enrique Pérez Santiago
- Born: May 13, 1916; Comerío, Puerto Rico
- Died: May 20, 1999 (aged 83)
- Education: University of Maryland School of Medicine (M.D.)
- Occupations: educator and hematologíst

Enrique Pérez Santiago

Dr. Enrique Pérez Santiago, MD (1916 – June 20, 1999) was a Puerto Rican medical doctor. Born in Comerio, he was the first Puerto Rican hematologist and he began the formal program at the University of Puerto Rico Hospital.

== Early life and education ==
His father don Manuel A. Pérez was a public servant, reason which had to move to San Juan, Puerto Rico. Enrique studied at the UPR Rio Piedras, where he joined Phi Sigma Alpha fraternity. Later he went to study at the University of Maryland School of Medicine and graduated in 1943. He then returned to Puerto Rico to do his internship at the District Hospital in Fajardo.

== Medical career ==
After serving in the Army Medical Corps he joined the Tropical School of Medicine to do his residency in internal medicine. At the end of his training, he stayed as a doctor and became acting medical director. In 1950, he moved to Boston to specialize in hematology with the renowned hematologist William Dameshek at the New England Medical Center of Tufts University. On his return, he went to work at the Bayamón District Hospital as Director of Hematology and at his private practice at Presbyterian Hospital.

He was teaching Hematology at the UPR, Medical Sciences Campus in 1954, year when the campus graduated its first class. He joined the Interamerican Society of Hematology and, in 1958, he joined the newly founded American Society of Hematology. That same year, Dr. William Crosby, director of the research laboratory of the Walter Reed Army Medical Center met with Dr. Pérez Santiago to establish a research center at the Rodriguez Military Hospital at Fort Brooke Army post in San Juan for studying the Tropical sprue, which was at that time an endemic condition on the island and in tropical regions of Asia. In some time the laboratory and the research center were established in the Conference Room 10 of the military hospital. There were many leading research doctors doing their army internship, studying the cause and treatment of the sprue. Pérez Santiago, in collaboration with Thomas Sheehy, published one of the first studies of the treatment of sprue with antibiotics and other alternatives.

In 1960 when the District Hospital of Bayamón moved to the Hospital Ruiz Soler, where Puerto Rico Medical Center would be established, Pérez Santiago was named director of Hematology of the hospital and of the medical school. With it came his closest collaborators, Jean Fradera, Director of the Laboratory and researcher, and Mary López, his secretary. In 1960 he was elected President of the Medical Association of Puerto Rico.

== Public service ==
In 1967, Governor Rafael Hernández Colón named him director of planning of the Department of health. In 1968, he invited the American Society of Hematology to hold its 1970 Convention in Puerto Rico. It was a great success with over 3000 attendees, typical festivals in Casa de España and the Dupont Plaza Hotel and a concert in the theater of the University led by Pablo Casals. After this Convention, he founded the Puerto Rican Society of Hematology in 1971. In 1973, he became Assistant Secretary of Health. Then he was medical director of the Cancer Center, a project which was unsuccessful. From 1976 to 1978 he was the Dean of the UPR, Medical Sciences Campus. There he recruited Lillian Haddock as associate Dean and Dr. Pedro Rossello for the Department of Surgery and Medicine. He also expanded educational consortia.

Later, Pérez Santiago returned to his private practice. But his public service was not over. Governor Hernández Colon returned to recruit as director of the Office of Quality Public Service. This was the basis for the founding of the Office of Government Ethics of Puerto Rico.

== Personal life ==
Dr. Pérez Santiago married Cecilia Diaz Bonet and they had six children.

== See also ==
- List of Puerto Ricans
