= José Ramón Figueroa =

Puerto Rican coffee planter, merchant, and businessman

José Ramón Figueroa y Rivera
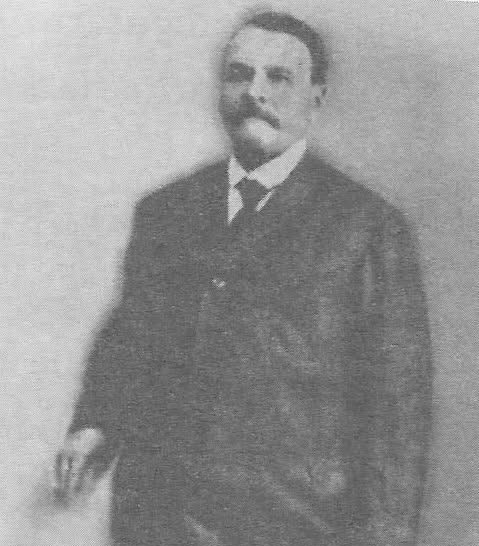
- José Ramón Figueroa
- Born: August 4, 1836; Comerío, Puerto Rico
- Died: November 22, 1918 (aged 82); Ponce, Puerto Rico
- Other names: "Marqués de Villalba"
- Occupations: Coffee planter, merchant, businessman
- Known for: Economic development in Comerío
- Spouse: Cármen Reyes Arroyo (m. 1863; died 1902)

José Ramón Figueroa y Rivera (4 August 1836 – 22 November 1918) was a Puerto Rican coffee planter, merchant, and businessman. He was born in Comerío, Puerto Rico and played a key role in the economic and agricultural development of the region.

== Biography ==
José Ramón Figueroa was born in the town of Comerío, at the time part of the Captaincy General of Puerto Rico. Like most people from the mountainous regions, he was illiterate.

Figueroa was one of the co-founders of the municipality of Villalba, Puerto Rico. Both the town's main plaza and a street are named in his honor. The Catholic cemetery of the town was built on land he donated.

He owned large coffee plantations and became one of the wealthiest landowners in the Comerío area during the 19th century. He also owned property in Aibonito and Barcelona, Spain. He was also credited with pioneering the use of electricity in the region by installing one of the first private generators in Puerto Rico, illuminating his estate before electrification became widespread.

Figueroa died on November 22, 1918, in the city of Ponce. He is buried at the St. Vincent de Paul Catholic Cemetery in the Canas neighborhood.

== Family ==
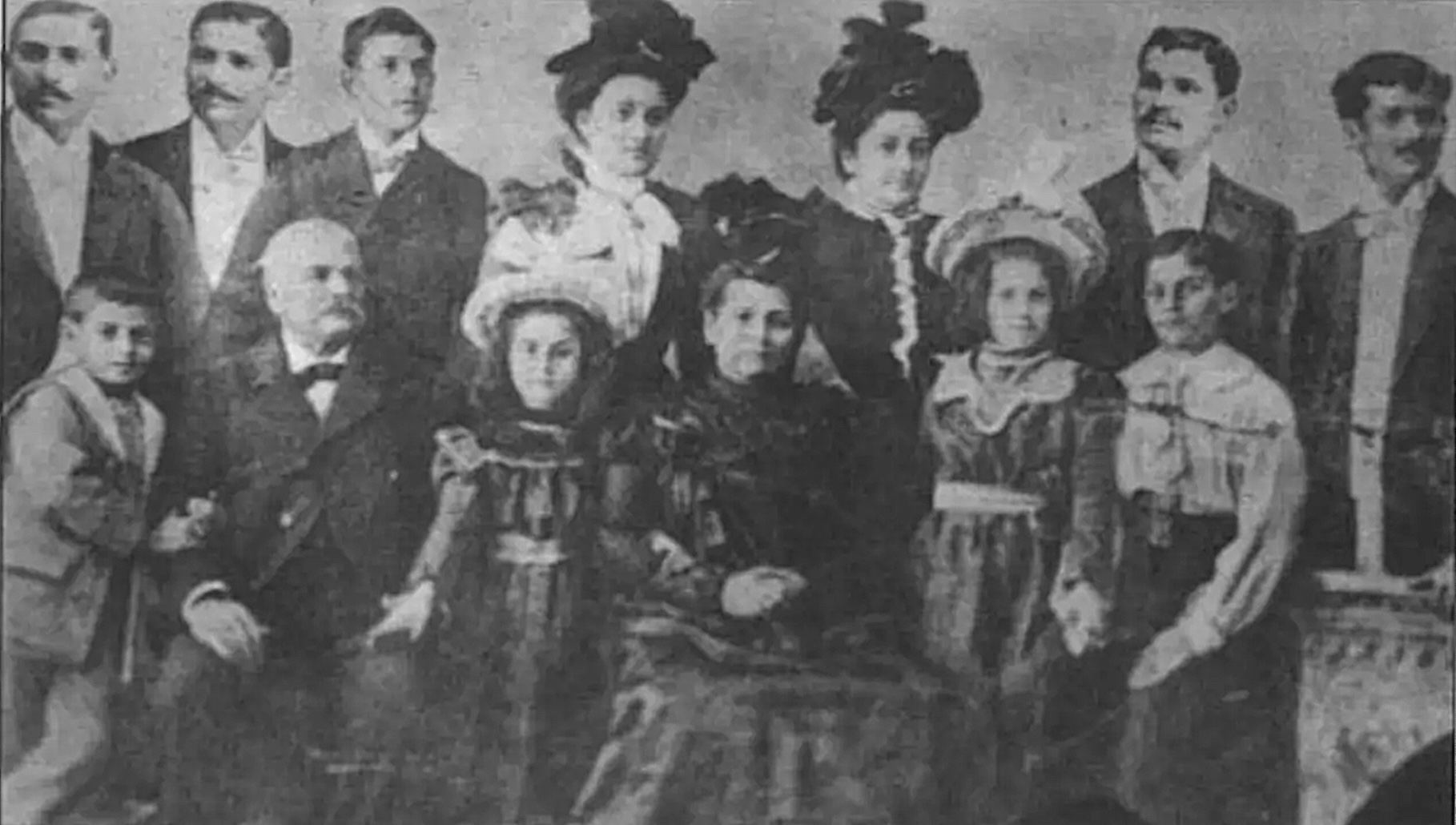
José Ramón Figueroa Rivera and his family in Barcelona, Spain.

Figueroa married multiple times. The Catholic Church in Villalba is named after his wife, Carmen Reyes Arroyo.

== See also ==
- Comerío, Puerto Rico
- Villalba, Puerto Rico
- Coffee production in Puerto Rico
