= Piñas, Comerío, Puerto Rico =

Barrio of Puerto Rico

Piñas
- Barrio
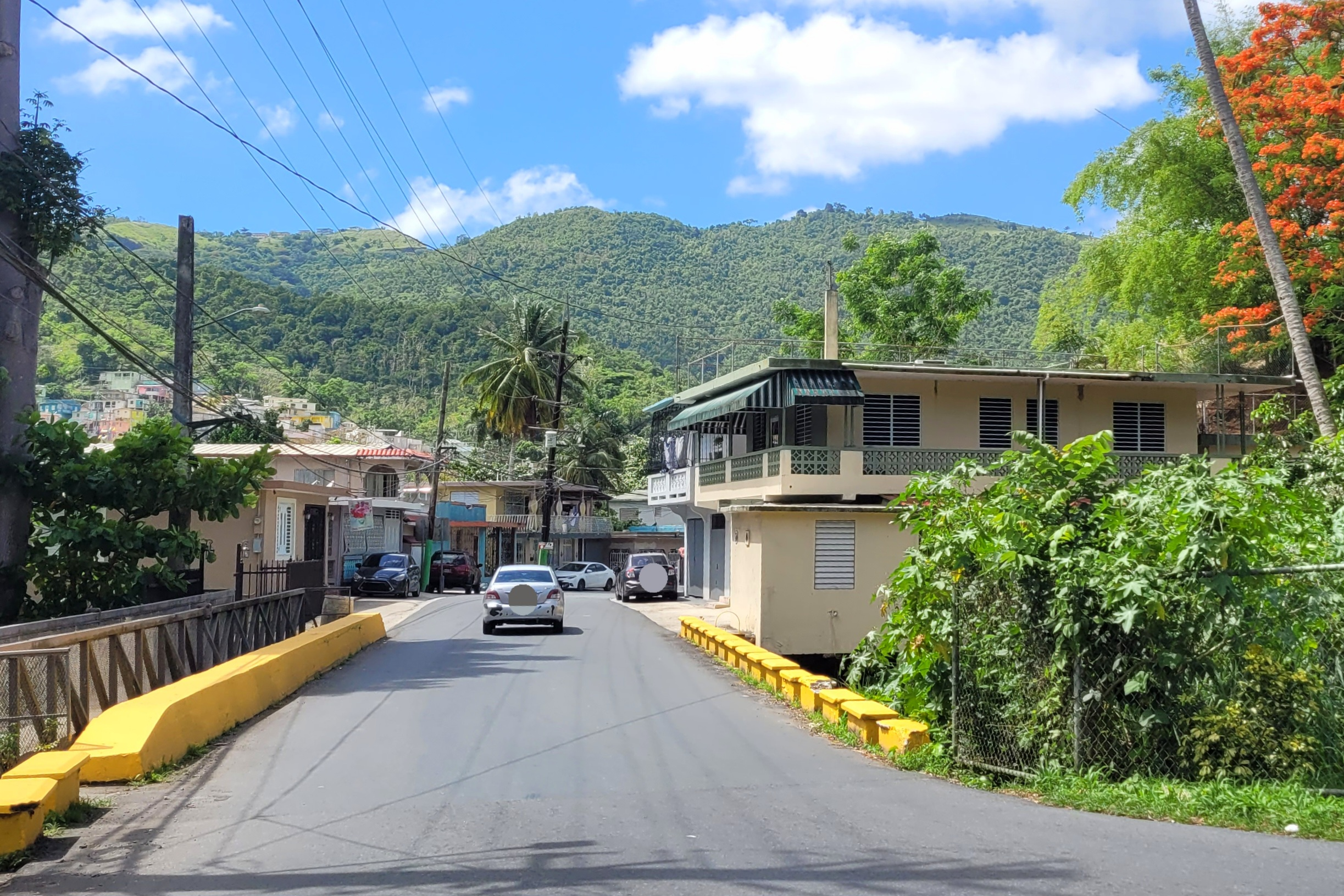
- Puerto Rico Highway 778 between Piñas and Comerío barrio-pueblo

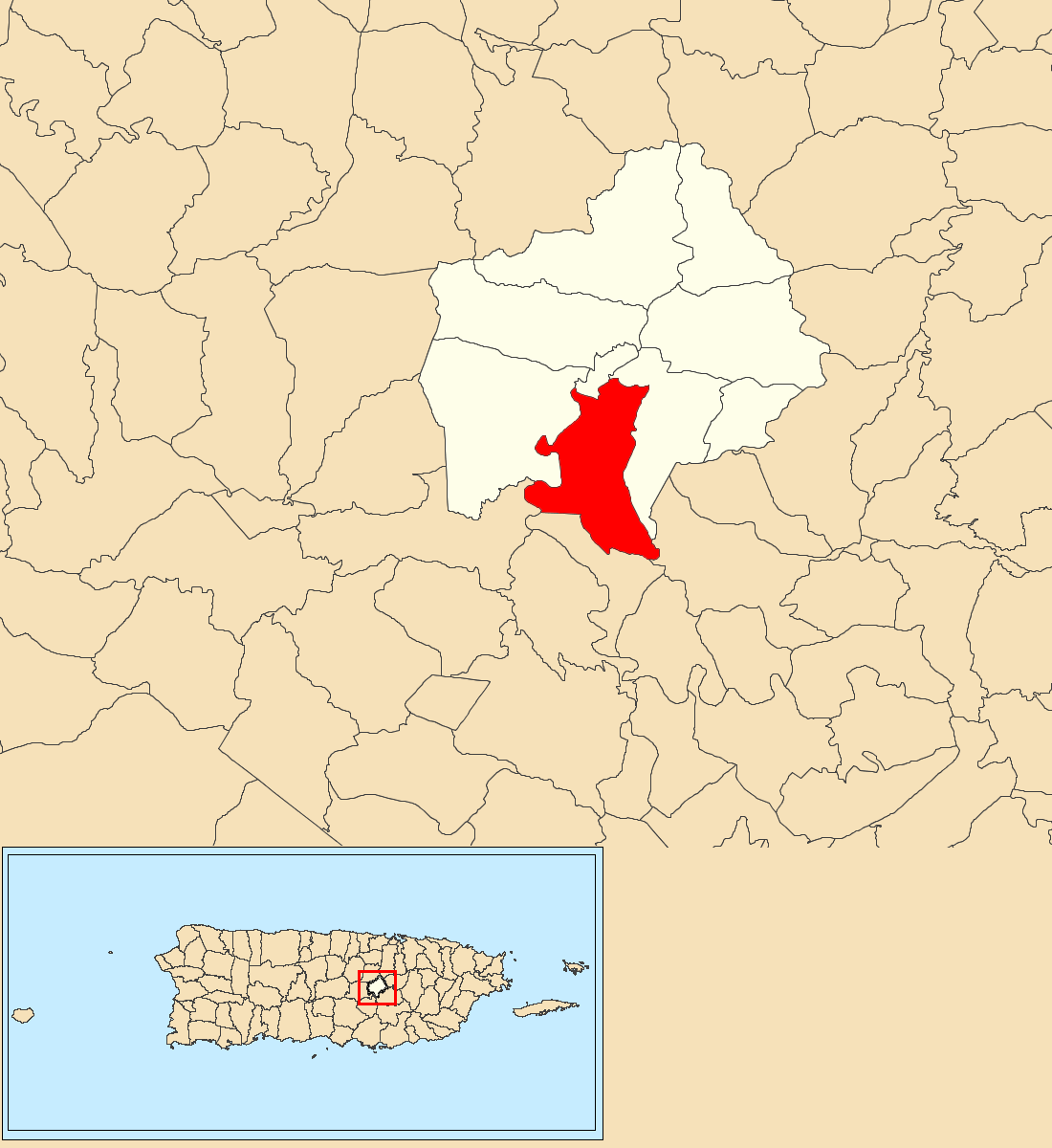
- Location of Piñas within the municipality of Comerío shown in red

- Location of Puerto Rico
- Coordinates: 18°11′42″N 66°13′35″W
- Commonwealth: Puerto Rico
- Municipality: Comerío

Area
  - Total: 3.33 sq mi (8.6 km^{2})
  - Land: 3.33 sq mi (8.6 km^{2})
  - Water: 0 sq mi (0 km^{2})
- Elevation: 1,063 ft (324 m)

Population (2010)
  - Total: 1,718
  - Density: 515.9/sq mi (199.2/km^{2})
- Source: 2010 Census
- Time zone: UTC−4 (AST)
- ZIP Code: 00782
- Area code: 787/939

Piñas is a barrio in the municipality of Comerío, Puerto Rico. Its population in 2010 was 1,718.

== Sectors and demographics ==
Barrios (which are, in contemporary times, roughly comparable to minor civil divisions) in turn are further subdivided into smaller local populated place areas/units called sectores (sectors in English). The types of sectores may vary, from normally sector to urbanización to reparto to barriada to residencial, among others.

The following sectors are in Piñas:

Barriada La Plata, Hogar Hacienda El Trovador, Parts of Carretera 775, Parts of Carretera 7774, Paseo de La Mora, Reparto Jesús Acosta, Sector Gabriel López, Sector La Frontera, Sector La Mora, Sector Las Posas, Sector Parcelas, Sector Viento Caliente, Sector Villa Brava (Piñas Abajo), and Urbanización La Hacienda.

Historical population
Census	Pop.	Note	%±
1910	1,137		—
1920	1,323		16.4%
1930	1,488		12.5%
1940	1,403		−5.7%
1950	1,325		−5.6%
1960	1,149		−13.3%
1970	0		−100.0%
1980	1,715		—
1990	1,834		6.9%
2000	1,700		−7.3%
2010	1,718		1.1%
U.S. Decennial Census; 1900 (N/A) 1910-1930; 1930-1950 1980-2000 2010

== History ==
Piñas was in Spain's gazetteers until Puerto Rico was ceded by Spain in the aftermath of the Spanish–American War under the terms of the Treaty of Paris of 1898 and became an unincorporated territory of the United States. In 1899, the United States Department of War conducted a census of Puerto Rico finding that the combined population of Piñas and Vega barrios was 1,373.

== Gallery ==
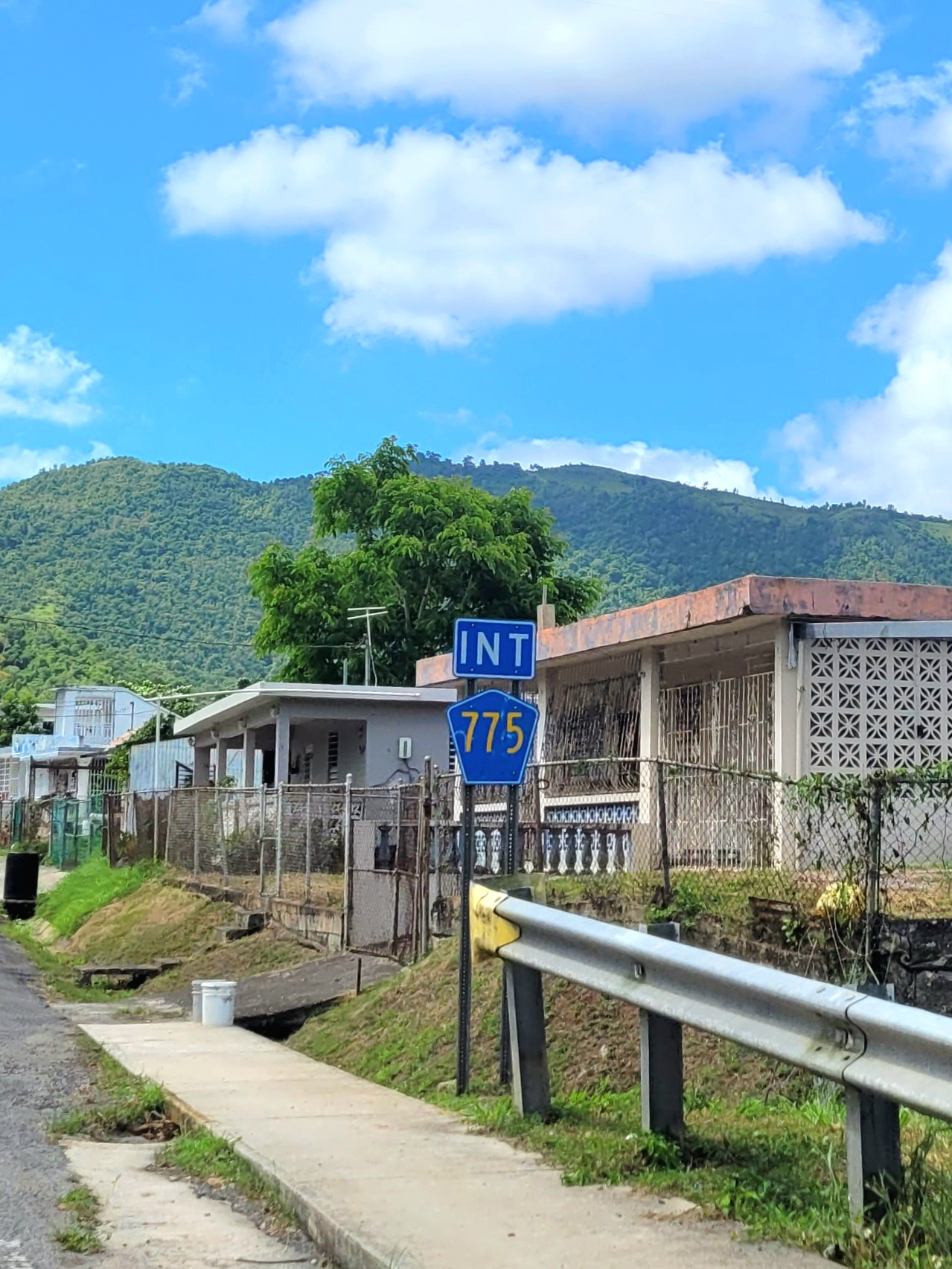
Road in Piñas

== See also ==
- List of communities in Puerto Rico
