= Cedrito, Comerío, Puerto Rico =

Barrio of Puerto Rico

Cedrito
- Barrio
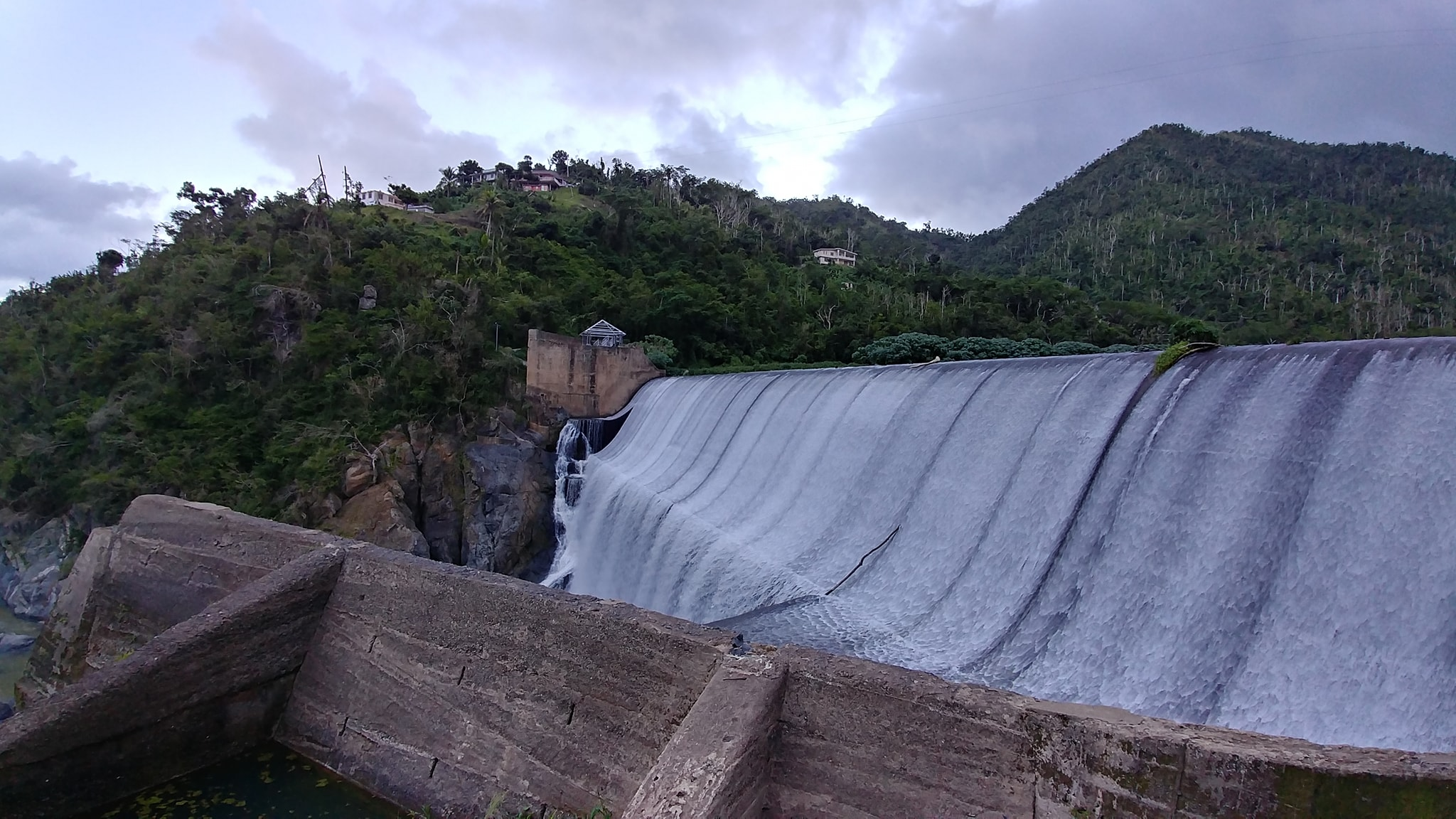
- El Salto de Comerío between Doña Elena and Cedrito

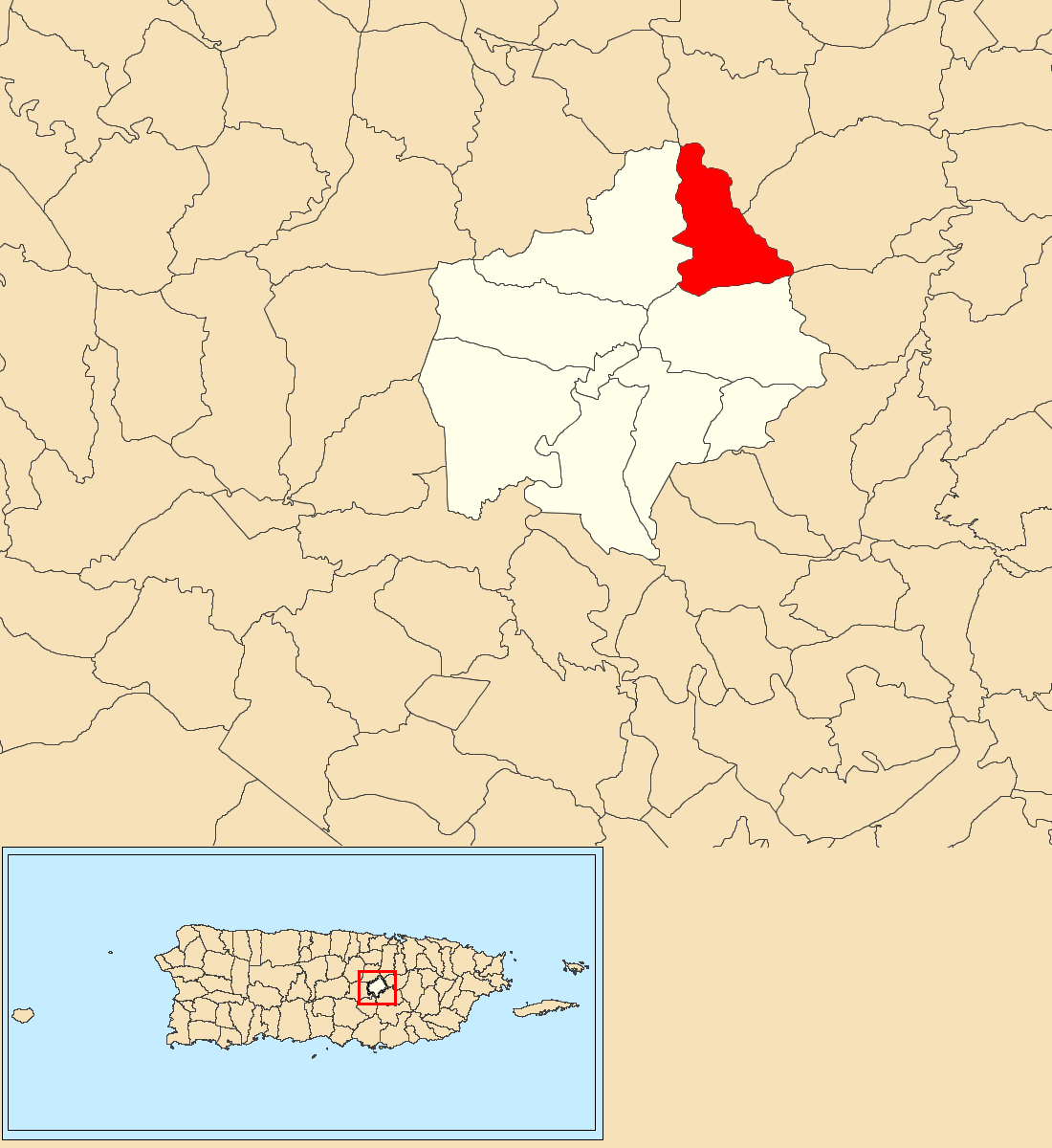
- Location of Cedrito within the municipality of Comerío shown in red

- Location of Puerto Rico
- Coordinates: 18°15′24″N 66°11′43″W
- Commonwealth: Puerto Rico
- Municipality: Comerío

Area
  - Total: 2.56 sq mi (6.6 km^{2})
  - Land: 2.52 sq mi (6.5 km^{2})
  - Water: 0.04 sq mi (0.10 km^{2})
- Elevation: 1,093 ft (333 m)

Population (2010)
  - Total: 1,191
  - Density: 472.6/sq mi (182.5/km^{2})
- Source: 2010 Census
- Time zone: UTC−4 (AST)
- ZIP Code: 00782
- Area code: 787/939

Cedrito is a barrio in the municipality of Comerío, Puerto Rico. Its population in 2010 was 1,191.

== Sectors ==
Barrios (which are, in contemporary times, roughly comparable to minor civil divisions) in turn are further subdivided into smaller local populated place areas/units called sectores (sectors in English). The types of sectores may vary, from normally sector to urbanización to reparto to barriada to residencial, among others.

The following sectors are in Cedrito barrio:

Sector Baudilio Torres, Sector Capilla, Sector La Prieta, Sector La Tiza, Sector Los Hernández, Sector Los Valenes, Sector Meléndez, Sector Parcelas, Sector Rabo de Buey, and Sector Toño Ayala.

== History ==
Cedrito was in Spain's gazetteers until Puerto Rico was ceded by Spain in the aftermath of the Spanish–American War under the terms of the Treaty of Paris of 1898 and became an unincorporated territory of the United States. In 1899, the United States Department of War conducted a census of Puerto Rico finding that the combined population of Cedrito and Cejas barrios was 1,158.

Historical population
Census	Pop.	Note	%±
1910	760		—
1920	1,003		32.0%
1930	1,110		10.7%
1940	1,329		19.7%
1950	1,113		−16.3%
1960	1,075		−3.4%
1970	880		−18.1%
1980	1,071		21.7%
1990	1,150		7.4%
2000	1,269		10.3%
2010	1,191		−6.1%
U.S. Decennial Census; 1900 (N/A) 1910-1930; 1930-1950 1980-2000 2010

== See also ==
- List of communities in Puerto Rico
