= Manuel A. Pérez =

Puerto Rican government official (1890–1951)

Manuel A. Pérez Pérez

Commissioner of Labor, Puerto Rico
- In office 1943–1947

Personal details
- Born: December 2, 1890 Comerío, Puerto Rico
- Died: May 7, 1951 (aged 60); San Juan, Puerto Rico
- Relatives: Celestino Pérez, mayor of Comerío
- Occupation: government official, teacher, farmer
- Known for: Founder, Puerto Rico Agricultural Association; Organized the Bureau of Vital Statistics

Manuel A. Pérez Pérez (December 2, 1890 - May 7, 1951) was a Puerto Rican government official who served as the Commissioner of Labor (1943-1947) and also as interim governor.

== Biography ==
Manuel A. Pérez was born on December 2, 1890, in the town of Comerío, Puerto Rico to Celestino Pérez and Josefa Pérez. He studied in his hometown and at the Industrial School in Puerta de Tierra.

From 1907 to 1909, he worked as an office employee at the Puerto Rico Leaf Tobacco Company in Caguas.

In 1910, when he was 20 years old, he obtained his elementary school teaching certificate, and worked as such until 1912. He then attended the University of Puerto Rico in pursuit of a higher education degree in Public Health.

From 1912 to 1924, he also dedicated time to agriculture, especially tobacco. One of his contributions was the organization and founding of the Puerto Rico Agricultural Association, an association for agriculture workers.

Thanks to a scholarship he received Johns Hopkins University in 1929, Pérez was able to attend the University of Maryland, College Park.

In 1934, he was forced to interrupt his career in public service due to the untimely death of his son. He returned to the United States where he lived for a year, before returning to work in Puerto Rico.

Pérez died of a heart attack at the Presbyterian Hospital in San Juan, Puerto Rico on May 7, 1951. He was 60 years old.

=== Political career ===
Manuel Pérez served three times as an interim governor of Puerto Rico; once during the administration of Rexford Guy Tugwell, and twice during the administration of Jesús T. Piñero.

During one of his interim tenures, he approved the law that created the music schools of Puerto Rico.

=== Family ===
Pérez married Carlota Santiago Carmona with whom he had three children: Carlos Manuel, Irma, and Enrique. Their oldest son, Carlos Manuel, died while he was still a college student. Their daughter, Irma, married Dr. Dwight Santiago Stevenson. His youngest son, Enrique, received a doctorate in Medicine from the University of Maryland.

== Legacy ==
The housing project, "Residencial Manuel A. Pérez", in San Juan, Puerto Rico bears his name. There is also the Manuel A. Pérez awards, which the government hands annually to distinguished public servants in the island.
