= Naranjo, Comerío, Puerto Rico =

Barrio of Puerto Rico

Naranjo
- Barrio
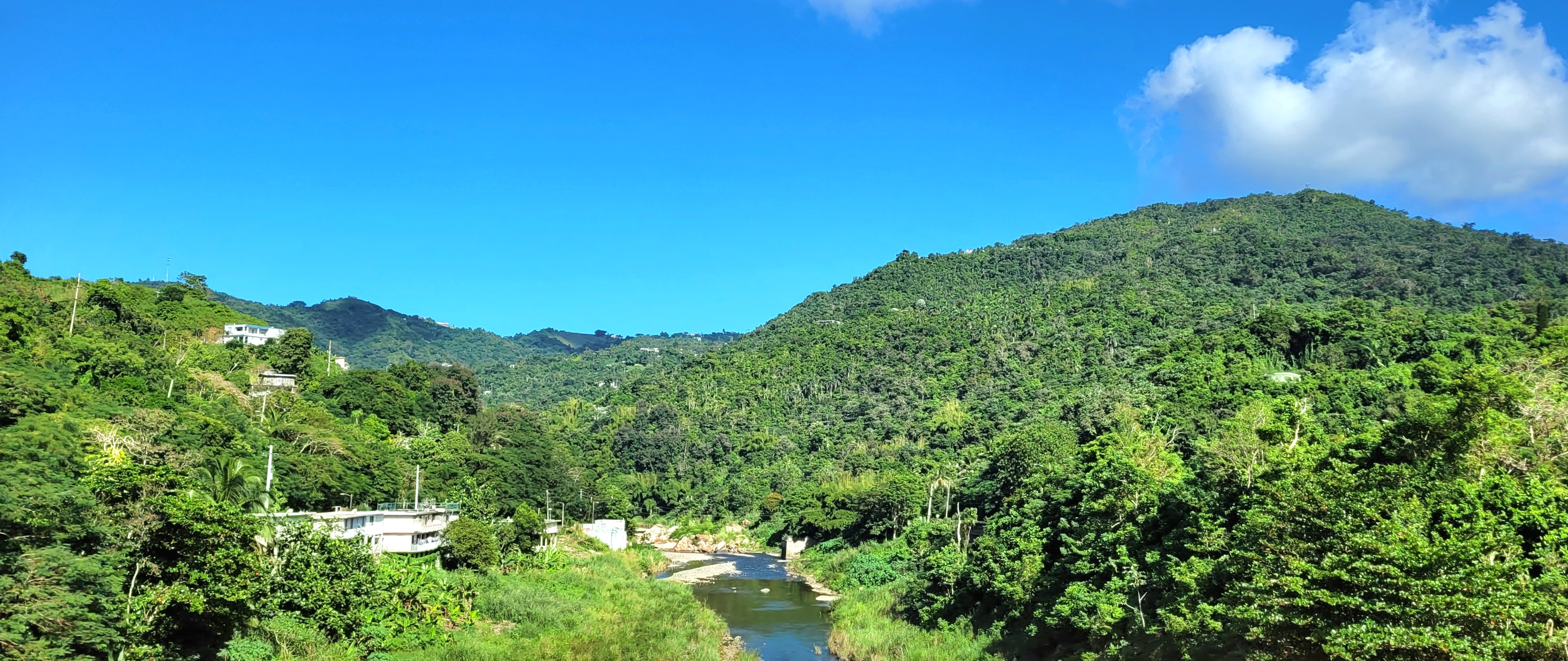
- Río de la Plata between Naranjo and Doña Elena

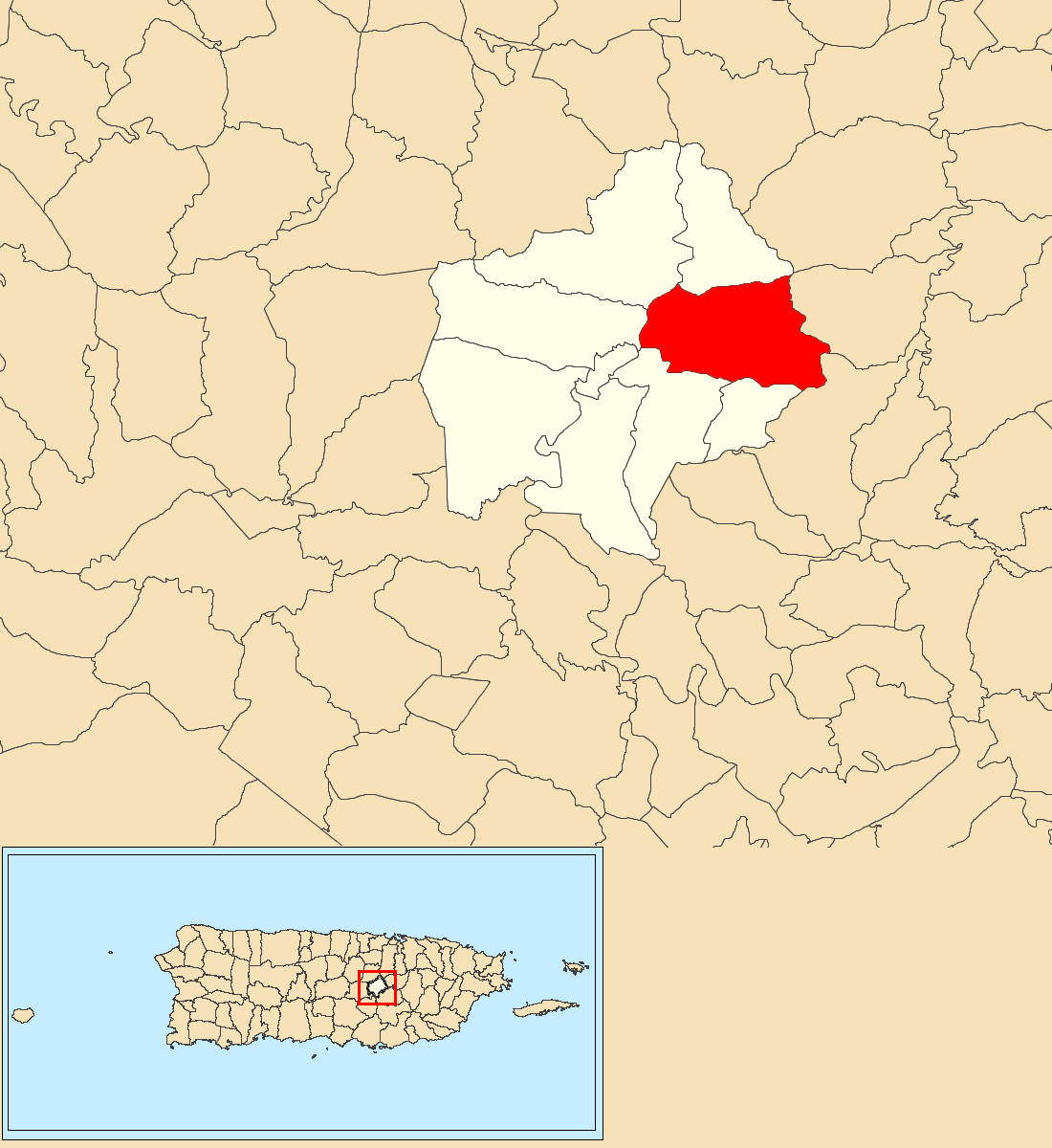
- Location of Naranjo within the municipality of Comerío shown in red

- Location of Puerto Rico
- Coordinates: 18°13′42″N 66°11′36″W
- Commonwealth: Puerto Rico
- Municipality: Comerío

Area
  - Total: 4.03 sq mi (10.4 km^{2})
  - Land: 4.03 sq mi (10.4 km^{2})
  - Water: 0 sq mi (0 km^{2})
- Elevation: 984 ft (300 m)

Population (2010)
  - Total: 1,915
  - Density: 475.2/sq mi (183.5/km^{2})
- Source: 2010 Census
- Time zone: UTC−4 (AST)
- ZIP Code: 00782
- Area code: 787/939

Naranjo is a barrio in the municipality of Comerío, Puerto Rico. Its population in 2010 was 1,915.

== Sectors ==
Barrios (which are, in contemporary times, roughly comparable to minor civil divisions) in turn are further subdivided into smaller local populated place areas/units called sectores (sectors in English). The types of sectores may vary, from normally sector to urbanización to reparto to barriada to residencial, among others.

The following sectors are in Naranjo:

PR-156, PR-791, Comunidad Naranjo, Hogar Comerío Home Care, Parcelas El Verde, Parts of Puerto Rico Highway 172, Pueblo Viejo, Punta Brava, Sector El Punto, Sector El Verde I, Sector El Verde II, Sector Escuela, Sector La Virgencita, Sector Montañez, Sector Sabana, Urbanización Hacienda Campo Bello, and Urbanización Vista Verde.

== History ==
Naranjo was in Spain's gazetteers until Puerto Rico was ceded by Spain in the aftermath of the Spanish–American War under the terms of the Treaty of Paris of 1898 and became an unincorporated territory of the United States. In 1899, the United States Department of War conducted a census of Puerto Rico finding that the population of Naranjo barrio was 815.

Historical population
Census	Pop.	Note	%±
1900	815		—
1910	973		19.4%
1920	1,637		68.2%
1930	2,016		23.2%
1940	2,372		17.7%
1950	2,408		1.5%
1960	1,516		−37.0%
1970	1,650		8.8%
1980	1,894		14.8%
1990	2,040		7.7%
2000	1,845		−9.6%
2010	1,915		3.8%
U.S. Decennial Census; 1899 (shown as 1900) 1910-1930; 1930-1950 1980-2000 2010

== See also ==
- List of communities in Puerto Rico
