= Cejas, Comerío, Puerto Rico =

Barrio of Puerto Rico

Cejas
- Barrio
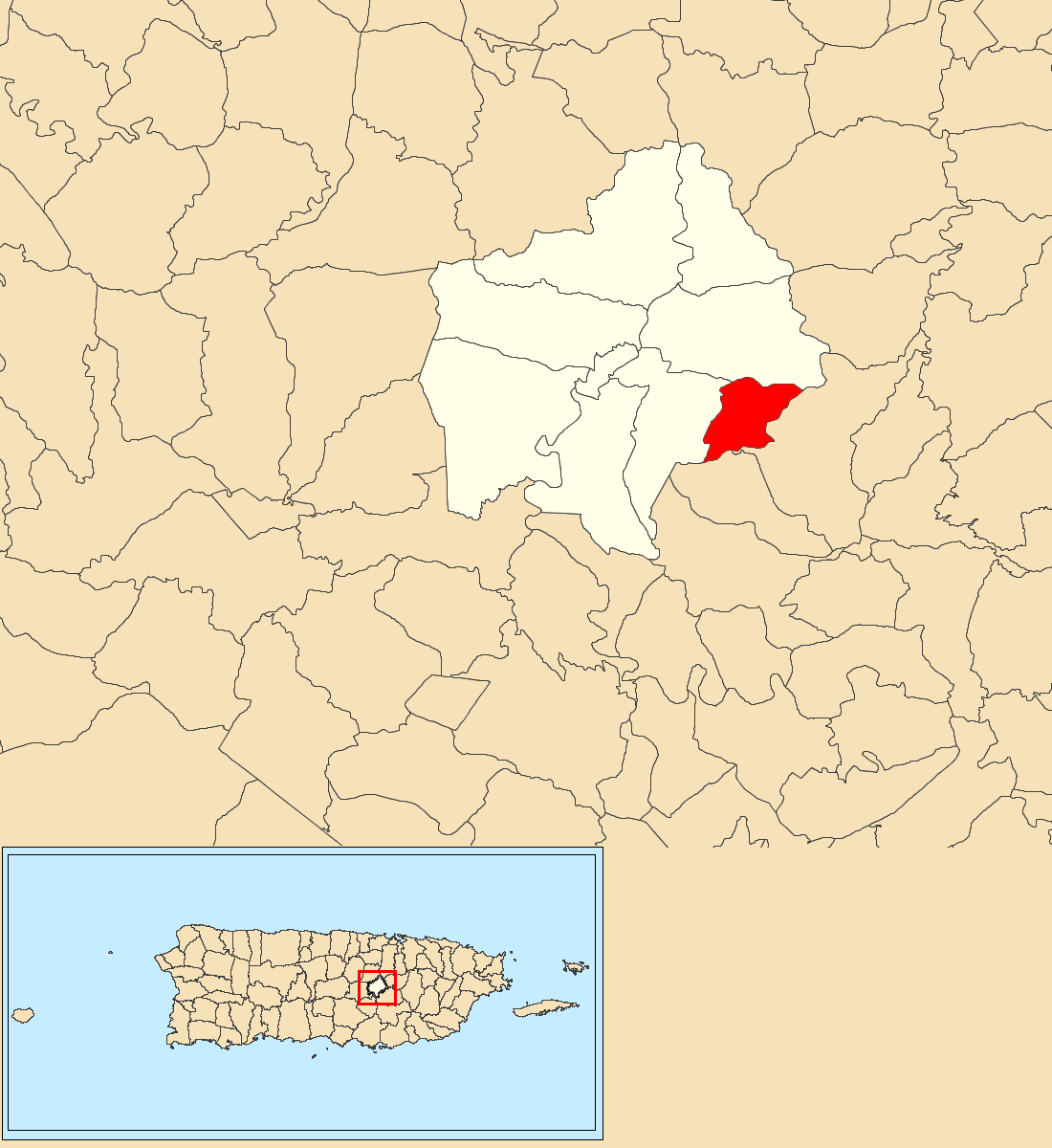
- Location of Cejas within the municipality of Comerío shown in red

- Location of Puerto Rico
- Coordinates: 18°12′32″N 66°11′22″W
- Commonwealth: Puerto Rico
- Municipality: Comerío

Area
  - Total: 1.26 sq mi (3.3 km^{2})
  - Land: 1.26 sq mi (3.3 km^{2})
  - Water: 0 sq mi (0 km^{2})
- Elevation: 1,522 ft (464 m)

Population (2010)
  - Total: 829
  - Density: 657.9/sq mi (254.0/km^{2})
- Source: 2010 Census
- Time zone: UTC−4 (AST)
- ZIP Code: 00782
- Area code: 787/939

Cejas is a barrio in the municipality of Comerío, Puerto Rico. Its population in 2010 was 829.

== Sectors ==
Barrios (which are, in contemporary times, roughly comparable to minor civil divisions) in turn are further subdivided into smaller local populated place areas/units called sectores (sectors in English). The types of sectores may vary, from normally sector to urbanización to reparto to barriada to residencial, among others.

The following sectors are in Cejas barrio:

Sector Justo Rivera, and Sector Los Vicentes.

== History ==
Cejas was in Spain's gazetteers until Puerto Rico was ceded by Spain in the aftermath of the Spanish–American War under the terms of the Treaty of Paris of 1898 and became an unincorporated territory of the United States. In 1899, the United States Department of War conducted a census of Puerto Rico finding that the combined population of Cejas and Cedrito barrios was 1,158.

Historical population
Census	Pop.	Note	%±
1910	460		—
1920	594		29.1%
1930	455		−23.4%
1940	599		31.6%
1950	394		−34.2%
1960	519		31.7%
1970	465		−10.4%
1980	492		5.8%
1990	587		19.3%
2000	860		46.5%
2010	829		−3.6%
U.S. Decennial Census; 1900 (N/A) 1910-1930; 1930-1950 1980-2000 2010

== See also ==
- List of communities in Puerto Rico
