= Lalah (Puerto Rican singer) =

- Born: Alana Del Mar Gómez; 31 July 2001 (age 24)
- Origin: Comerío, Puerto Rico
- Genres: Latin pop
- Occupation: Singer-songwriter
- Instrument(s): Vocals, ukulele
- Years active: 2020–present
- Labels: MS Groove Records
- Website: Official URL

Alana Del Mar Gómez (born 31 July 2001), better known as Lalah is a Puerto Rican singer-songwriter who released her first single in 2020. Her background includes collaboration with artists such as Tommy Torres and Christian Daniel.

== Musical career ==
=== Early years ===
Alana Del Mar Gómez was born in San Juan, Puerto Rico and raised in Comerío, Puerto Rico. She began her professional singing career at the age of 14 as a backup vocalist for Puerto Rican pop singer-songwriter Christian Daniel. She auditioned for La Voz Kids in 2014 with the song "Hit Me With Your Best Shot".

In 2020, she was the winner of an Open Mic competition seeking for new artist to perform at San Sebastián Street Festival, which she won and got to perform at three of the main stages of the festival.

=== Lalah (2020–present) ===
She released her debut single "Don't Go" under the name Lalah in June 2020, a song she wrote at the age of 13. Her follow-up single was "La Talla" which showcases a more Latin pop style in her music.

In September 2020, she went viral on TikTok after posting a video singing a song she wrote titled "Aquí Vamo", which currently has over 1.3 million views and more than 414,300 reposted videos with her original audio. The song has a more significant theme against the sexualization of women and generated a movement around the fight for equal treatment. She then recorded and released the song in November 2020.

On November 18, 2020, her single "Tough Girl" was released under Warner Music. The song is the main theme of the YouTube online series Bravas starring Natti Natasha. Her latest single "Mi Islita Bella" was released on December 6, 2020.

== Personal life ==
Lalah is daughter of professional music producer José "El Profesor" Gómez. Her mother Eileen is a drama teacher.

== Discography ==
Year	Title	Album
2020	"Don't Go"	Non-album singles
2020	"La Talla"	Non-album singles
2020	"Aquí Vamo'"	Non-album singles
2020	"Tough Girl"	Original Music From The Series Bravas
2020	"Mi Islita bella"	Non-album single
