= Comerío, Puerto Rico =

Town and municipality in Puerto Rico

Comerío Municipio Autónomo de Comerío
- Town and Municipality
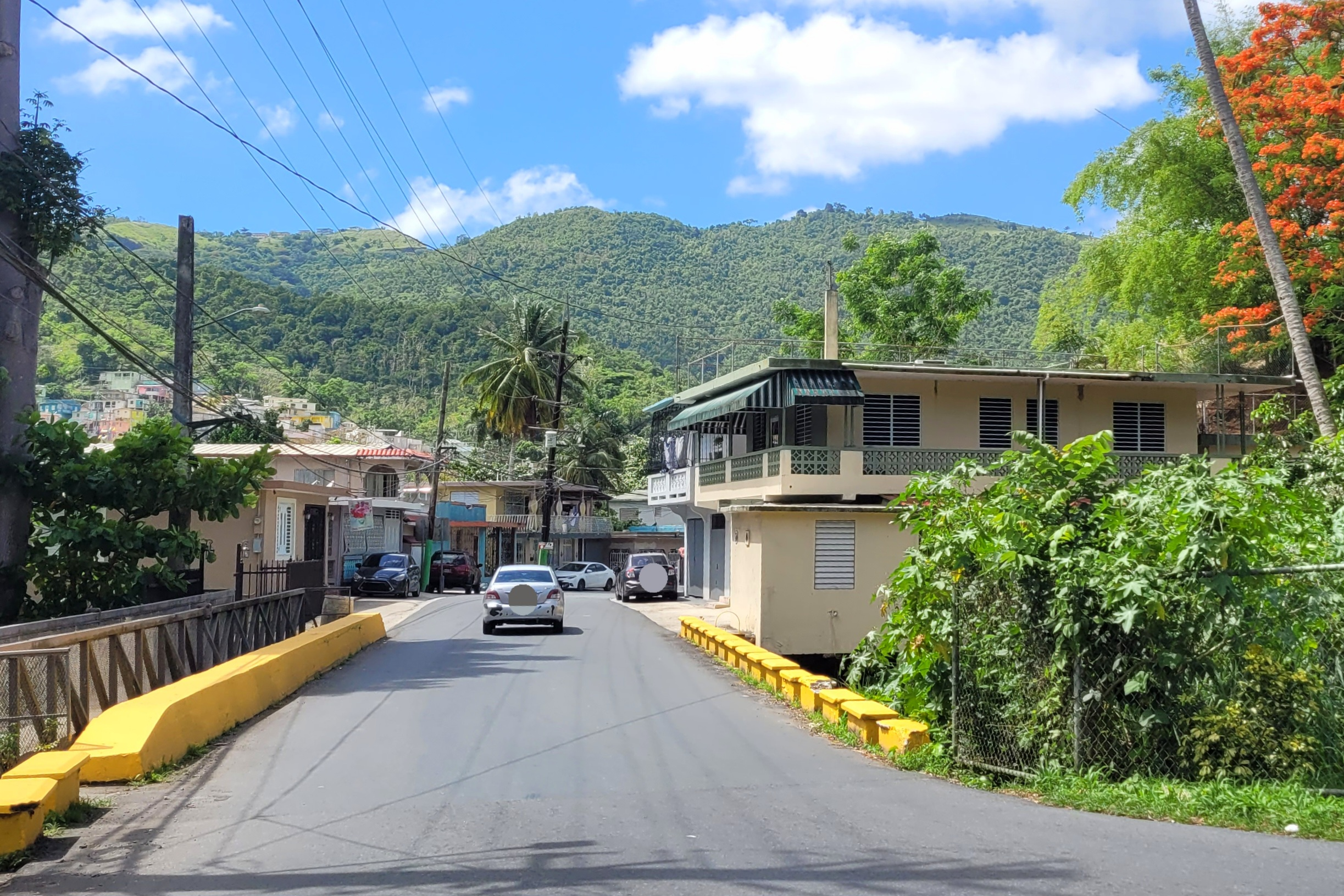
- PR-778 between Piñas and Comerío barrio-pueblo

- Flag Coat of arms
- Nicknames: "La Perla de Plata", "Pueblo de los Guabaleros"
- Anthem: "Con alma henchida de amor y ensueño"
- Map of Puerto Rico highlighting Comerío Municipality
- Coordinates: 18°13′05″N 66°13′34″W
- Sovereign state: United States
- Commonwealth: Puerto Rico
- Settled: late 18th century
- Founded: June 12, 1826
- Founder: Don José Díaz
- Barrios: 9 barrios: Cedrito; Cejas; Comerío barrio-pueblo; Doña Elena; Naranjo; Palomas; Piñas; Río Hondo; Vega Redonda

Government
  - Mayor: Irvin Rivera (PPD)
  - Senatorial dist.: 6 – Guayama
  - Representative dist.: 29

Area
  - Total: 28.24 sq mi (73.13 km^{2})
  - Land: 28 sq mi (73 km^{2})
  - Water: 0.050 sq mi (.13 km^{2})

Population (2020)
  - Total: 18,883
  - Estimate (2025): 18,445 ▼
  - Rank: 61st in Puerto Rico
  - Density: 670/sq mi (260/km^{2})
- Demonym: Comerieños
- Time zone: UTC−4 (AST)
- ZIP Code: 00782
- Area code: 787/939
- Website: www.visitacomerio.com/index.php

Comerío (Spanish pronunciation: [komeˈɾi.o]) is a town and municipality of Puerto Rico in the center-eastern region of island, north of Aibonito; south of Naranjito and Bayamón; east of Barranquitas; and west of Cidra and Aguas Buenas. Comerío is spread over 7 barrios and Comerío Pueblo (the downtown area and the administrative center of the city). It is part of the San Juan-Caguas-Guaynabo Metropolitan Statistical Area.

== History ==
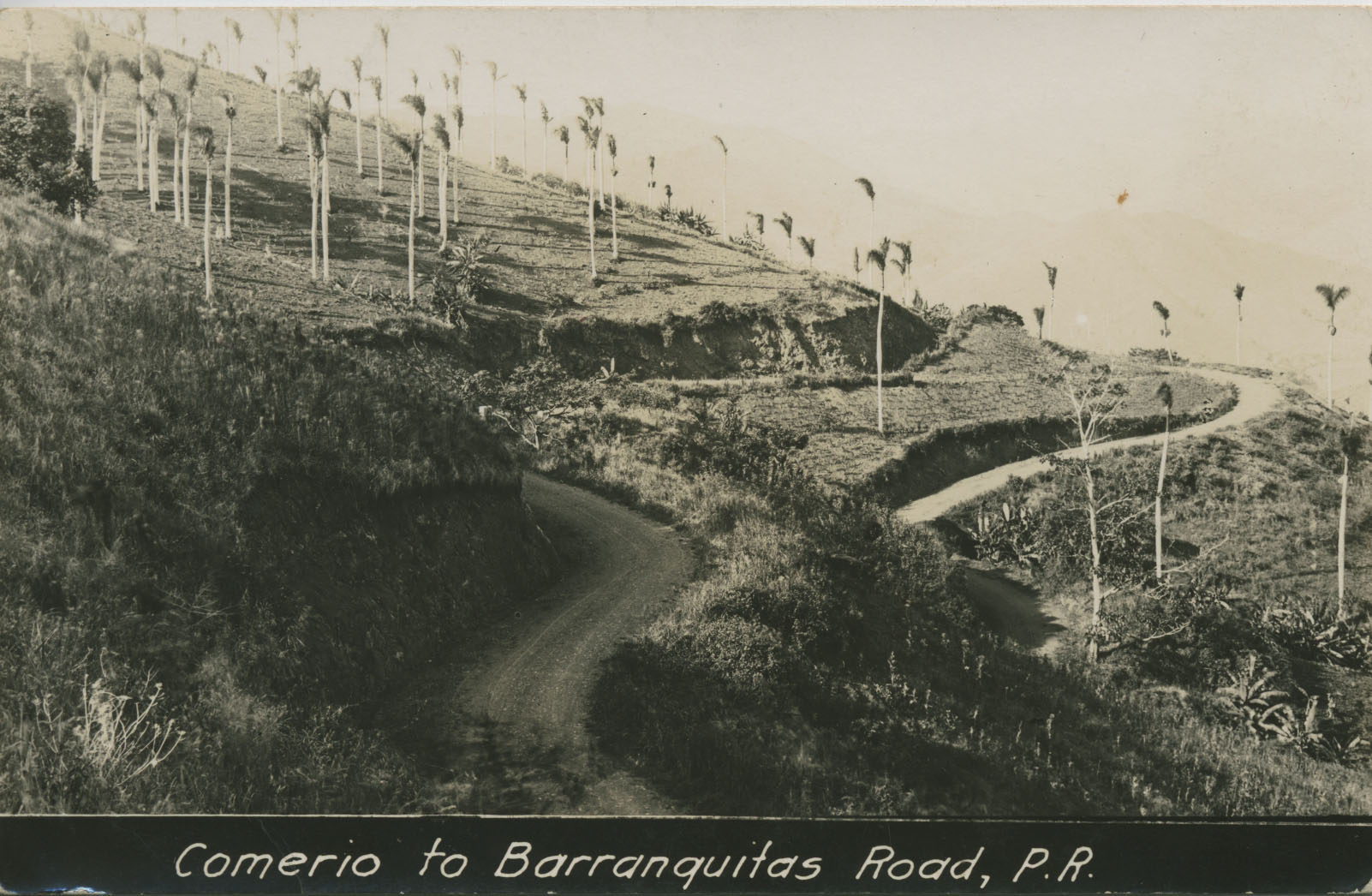
Comerío to Barranquitas Road c. 1900–1917

Comerío was founded on June 12, 1826. It was first named Sabana del Palmar, but later was renamed Comerío.

In 1854, nearly 1000 acres (1000 cuerdas) of land were being used for agriculture. In 1894, there was one sugar and two coffee plantations (estates) in Comerío. In the early 20th century, Comerio residents, had a short but legendary territory war with residents of the city of Barranquitas.

Don José Ramón Figueroa, a coffee planter, merchant and businessman who played a major role in the economic and agricultural development of the region, was from Comerío.

Puerto Rico was ceded by Spain in the aftermath of the Spanish–American War under the terms of the Treaty of Paris of 1898 and became a territory of the United States. In 1899, the United States Department of War conducted a census of Puerto Rico finding that the population of Comerío was 8,249.

Hurricane Maria on September 20, 2017, triggered numerous landslides in Comerío. The flooded river went through the center of Comerío. A week later the hospital, trying to run via generator, was out of diesel but due to the landslides, travel and deliveries, into and out of Comerío was next to impossible. Over 4,000 homes were affected, and of those 1,537 completely destroyed. After the hurricane, the National Guard from Ohio were tasked with restoring water purification systems for the people of Comerío. Two months after the hurricane, the mayor of Comerío said no personnel had made it yet to attempt the restoration of electrical power to Comerío. On October 9, another landslide happened blocking transit on PR-167. On October 10, a group of doctors from New York announced they would travel to volunteer their services to Comerío and nearby mountain municipalities.

== Geography ==
The rivers located in Comerío are Río de la Plata and Río Hondo.

=== Barrios ===
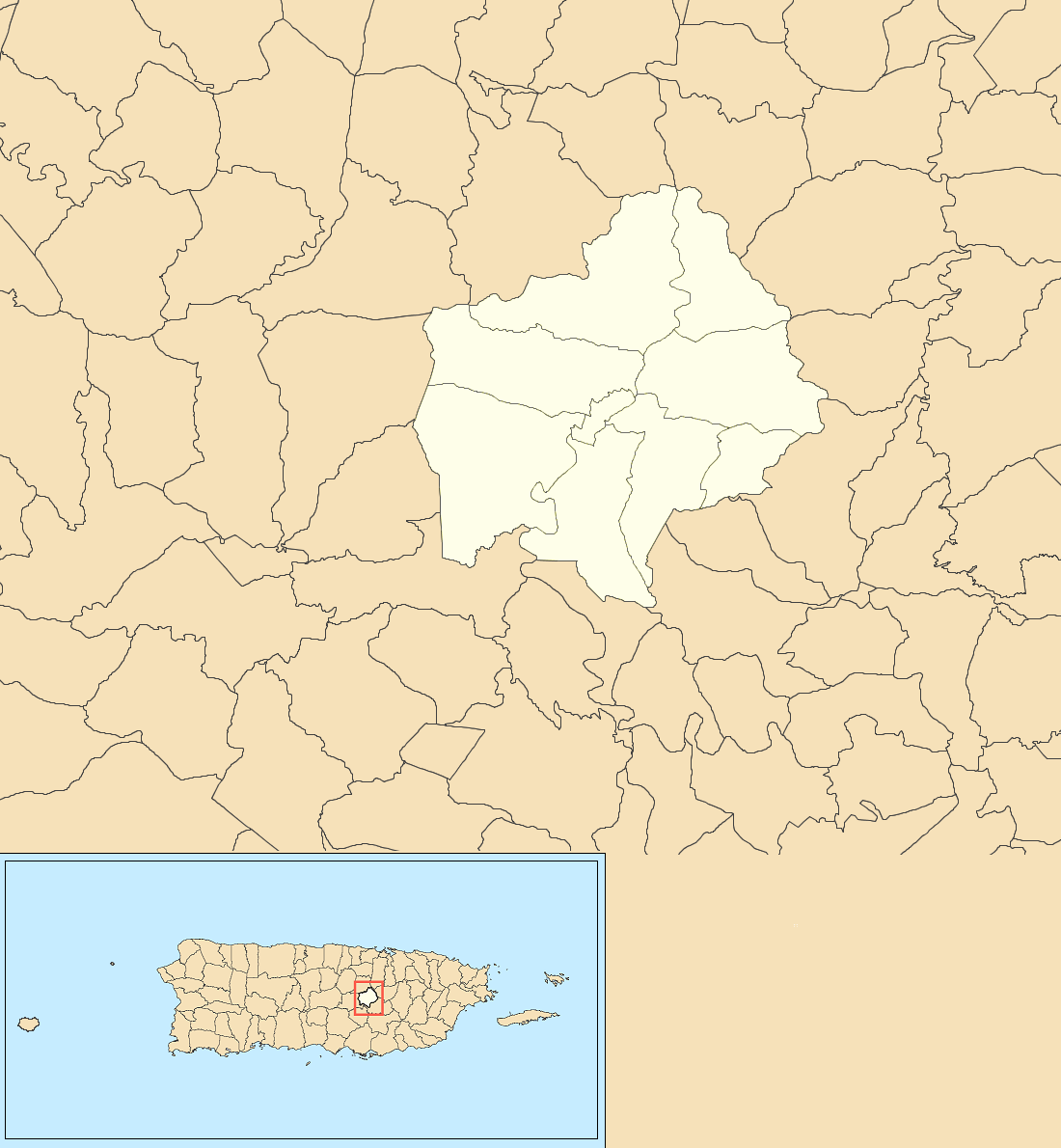
Subdivisions of Comerío.

Like all municipalities of Puerto Rico, Comerío is subdivided into barrios. The municipal buildings, central square and large Catholic church are located in a small barrio referred to as "el pueblo", near the center of the municipality.

1. Cedrito
2. Cejas
3. Comerío barrio-pueblo
4. Doña Elena
5. Naranjo
6. Palomas
7. Piñas
8. Río Hondo
9. Vega Redonda

=== Sectors ===
Barrios (which are, in contemporary times, roughly comparable to minor civil divisions) and subbarrios, are further subdivided into smaller areas called sectores (sectors in English). The types of sectores may vary, from normally sector to urbanización to reparto to barriada to residencial, among others.

=== Special Communities ===
Comunidades Especiales de Puerto Rico (Special Communities of Puerto Rico) are marginalized communities whose citizens are experiencing a certain amount of social exclusion. A map shows these communities occur in nearly every municipality of the commonwealth. Of the 742 places that were on the list in 2014, the following barrios, communities, sectors, or neighborhoods were in Comerio: Barriada Cielito, Sector Villa Brava in Piñas Abajo, El 26 in Palomas Abajo, El Higüero in Palomas Abajo, El Verde in Naranjo, La Juncia in Río Hondo II, La Pietra Cedrito, Río Hondo, and Vuelta del Dos.

== Tourism ==
To stimulate local tourism, the Puerto Rico Tourism Company launched the Voy Turistiendo ("I'm Touring") campaign, with a passport book and website. The Comerío page lists Las Pailas, Represa el Salto, and Media Luna, as places of interest.

=== Landmarks and places of interest ===
Some of the landmarks of Comerío include:

- La Tiza Peak
- La Mora Caves
- La Plata River
- Las Bocas Canyon
- Las Pailas
- Los Pilones
- Media Luna Recreation Park
- Tobacco Warehouse
- The main town square
- El Salto Hydroelectric Dams 1 and 2

== Economy ==
=== Agriculture ===
- Tobacco (not as predominant in recent years). Comerío was known as "El Pueblo del Tabaco" (Tobacco Town), and its original flag had a tobacco plant in its center.

== Culture ==
=== Festivals and events ===
Comerío celebrates its patron saint festival in August. The Fiestas Patronales Santo Cristo de la Salud is a religious and cultural celebration that generally features parades, games, artisans, amusement rides, regional food, and live entertainment.

Other festivals and events celebrated in Comerío include:

- Spring Carnival – April
- La Mora Cave Festival – June 1,2,3
- Jíbaro Festival – June
- El Jobo Festival – July
- San Andrés Apóstol Festivities – November
- El Seco Marathon – December
- Christmas Fantasy – December

=== Religion ===
First Methodist Church of Comerío was founded in 1904.

== Demographics ==
Historical population
Census	Pop.	Note	%±
1900	8,249		—
1910	11,170		35.4%
1920	14,708		31.7%
1930	16,715		13.6%
1940	18,539		10.9%
1950	17,966		−3.1%
1960	18,583		3.4%
1970	18,819		1.3%
1980	18,212		−3.2%
1990	20,265		11.3%
2000	20,002		−1.3%
2010	20,778		3.9%
2020	18,883		−9.1%
2025 (est.)	18,445	▼	−2.3%
U.S. Decennial Census; 1899 (shown as 1900) 1910–1930; 1930–1950 1960–2000 2010 2020

== Government ==
All municipalities in Puerto Rico are administered by a mayor, elected every four years. The current mayor of Comerío is Irvin Rivera, of the Popular Democratic Party (PPD). He was elected at the 2024 general elections.

The city belongs to the Puerto Rico Senatorial district VI, which is represented by two Senators. In 2024, Rafael Santos Ortiz and Wilmer Reyes Berríos were elected as District Senators.

== Symbols ==
The municipio has an official flag and coat of arms.

=== Flag ===
Quartered in cross, of green and white, and superimposed the right superior quarter is an anchored yellow cross.

=== Coat of arms ===
The Comerío coat of arms is made up quarters (4) bearing what is known as an escutcheon of displays a shield in the center. There's a green field with a golden cross in the left quarter which represents Holy Christ the Healer, the patron of the town. Green stripes on a silver field are on the lower left quarter, symbolizing the Comerío falls and the La Plata River. Three royal palms in the right quarter to remember the original name of the town, and an undulating line symbolizes the mist that often covers the town. A crown with Taino motifs represents the cacique. The tobacco plant is a reminder of what was once an important part of the economic activity of the municipality. Inscribed with "the pearl of La Plata" a reference is made to the location of Comerío, on the banks of the La Plata River and the turreted castle which is a symbol of municipalities of Puerto Rico.

== Transportation ==
Public bus from Bayamón to Comerío at Centro de Estacionamiento de Bayamón is the main public transportation.

There are 16 bridges in Comerío.

== Notable Comerieños ==
- Don José Ramón Figueroa (1836-1918) - Coffee planter, merchant, and businessman.
- Juana Colón (1886-1967) - Labor organizer, suffragist and Socialist.
- Blanca de Castejón (1906-1969) - Actress of the Golden Age of Mexican cinema.
- Antonio Maldonado - (born 1941) Airforce Brigadier General.
- Manuel A. Pérez (1890–1951) – Professor.
- Enrique Pérez Santiago (1916-1996) – Hematologist.
- Lalah (born 2001) - Singer-songwriter.

== Gallery ==
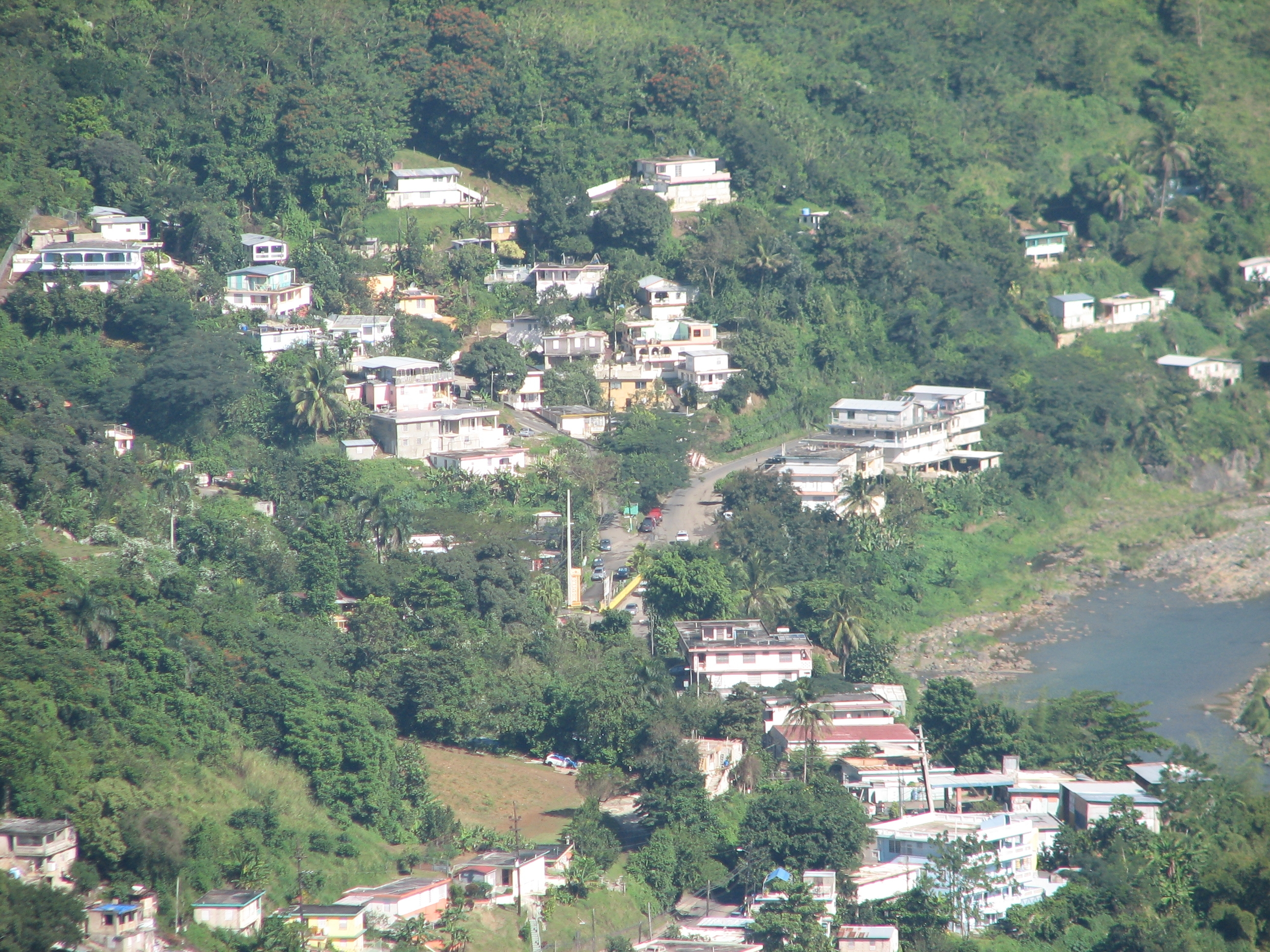
View looking north from Vega Redonda barrio in Comerio

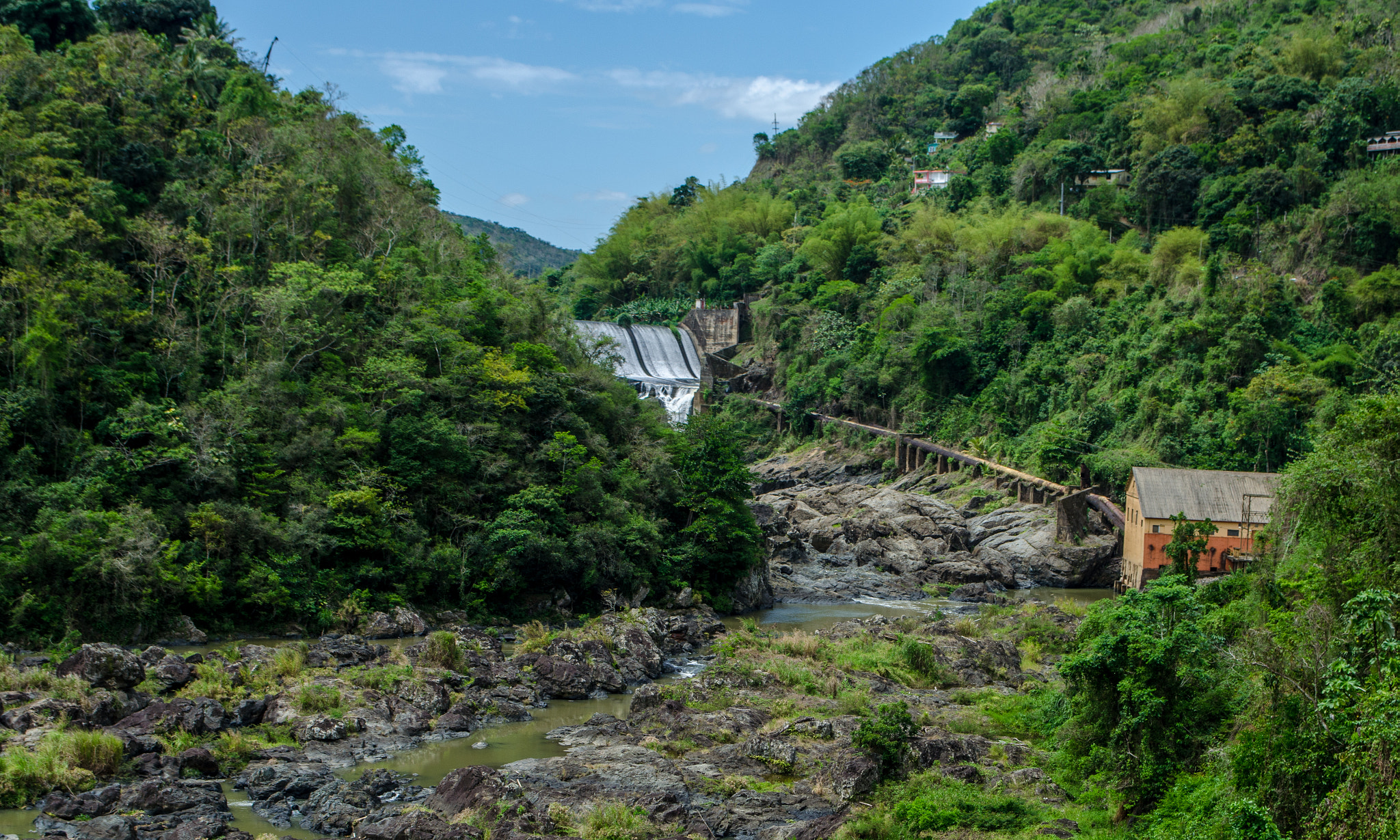
Old dam at El Salto, one of the oldest in Puerto Rico.

== See also ==
- List of Puerto Ricans
- History of Puerto Rico
- Did you know-Puerto Rico?
