= Palomas, Comerío, Puerto Rico =

Barrio of Puerto Rico

Palomas
- Barrio
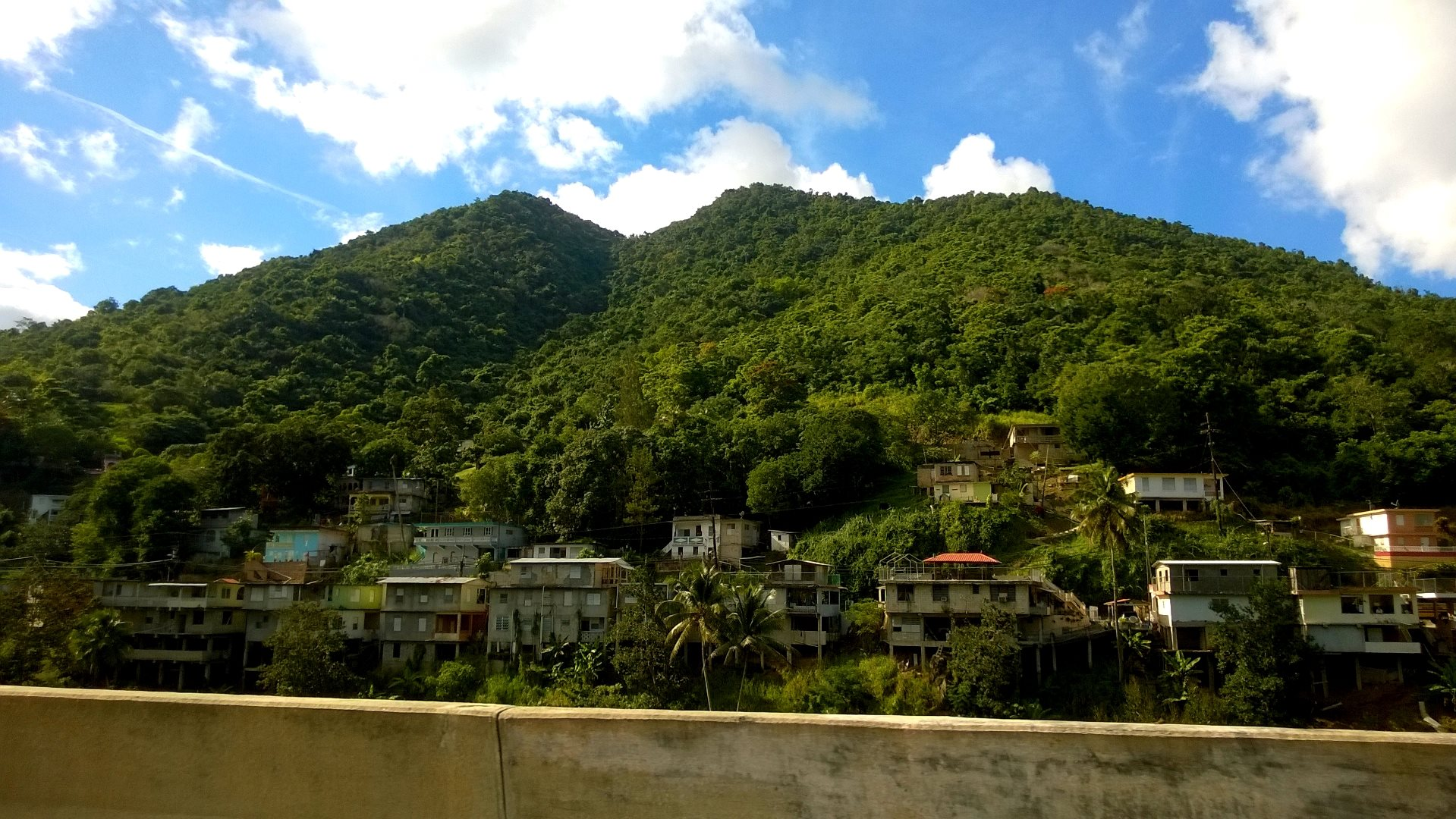
- Sector La Cascada in Palomas

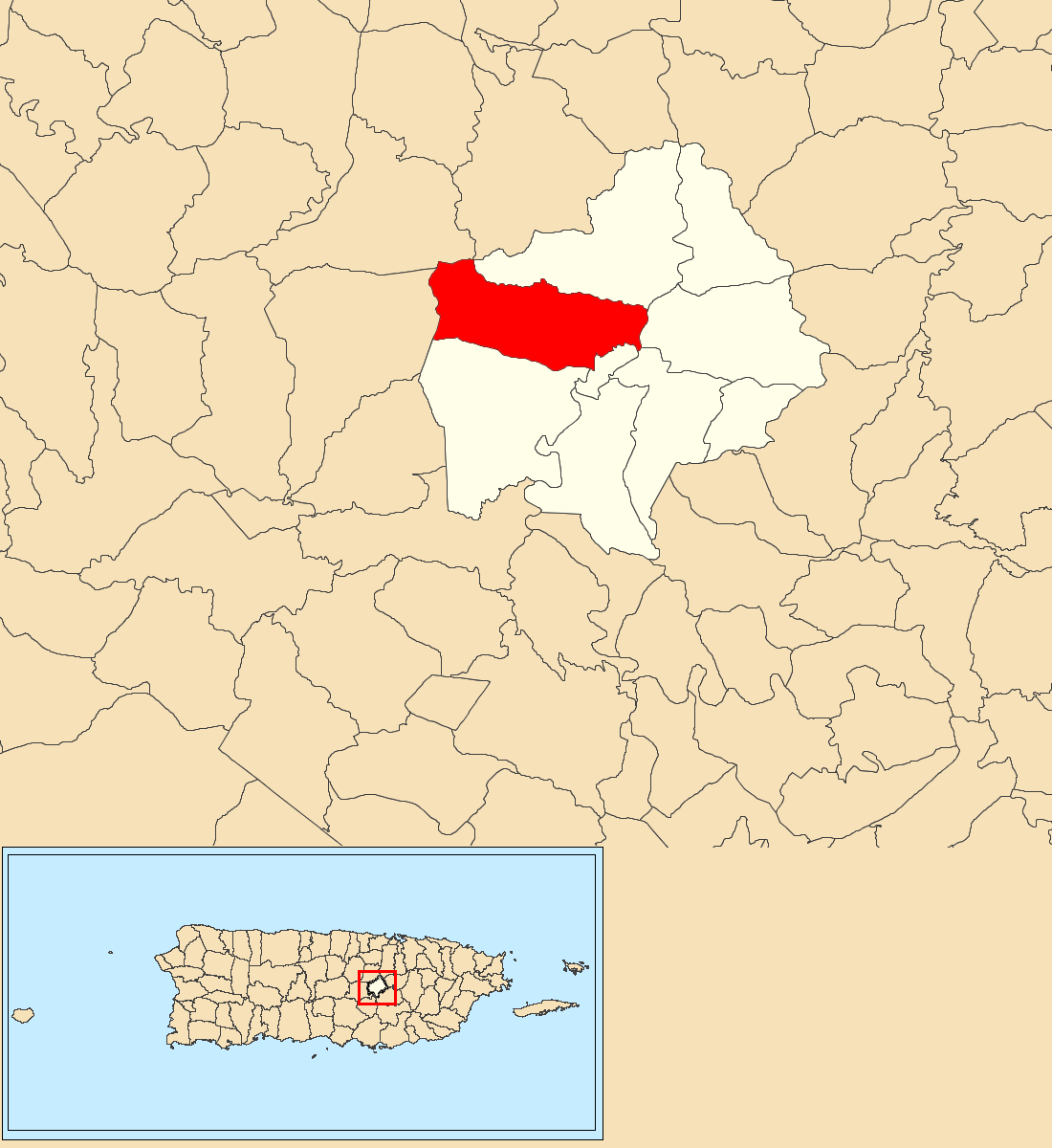
- Location of Palomas within the municipality of Comerío shown in red

- Location of Puerto Rico
- Coordinates: 18°14′00″N 66°14′27″W
- Commonwealth: Puerto Rico
- Municipality: Comerío

Area
  - Total: 3.97 sq mi (10.3 km^{2})
  - Land: 3.96 sq mi (10.3 km^{2})
  - Water: 0.01 sq mi (0.026 km^{2})
- Elevation: 1,742 ft (531 m)

Population (2010)
  - Total: 4,719
  - Density: 1,191.7/sq mi (460.1/km^{2})
- Source: 2010 Census
- Time zone: UTC−4 (AST)
- ZIP Code: 00782
- Area code: 787/939

Palomas is a barrio in the municipality of Comerío, Puerto Rico. Its population in 2010 was 4,719.

== Sectors ==
Barrios (which are, in contemporary times, roughly comparable to minor civil divisions) in turn are further subdivided into smaller local populated place areas/units called sectores (sectors in English). The types of sectores may vary, from normally sector to urbanización to reparto to barriada to residencial, among others.

The following sectors are in Palomas:

Condominios Brisas de la Sierra, Egda. Golden Living, Las Bocas, Palomas Abajo, Parcelas Nuevas y Viejas, Parts of Carretera 780, Sector Caimito, Sector Calderón, Sector Capilla, Sector Concho, Sector El Guareto, Sector El Mangó, Sector Escuela, Sector La Prá, Sector Los Chuchitos, Sector Los Liberales, Sector Los Oyola, Sector Los Vidrios, Sector Manuel Espina, Sector Manuel Reyes, Sector Negrón (R-809), Sector Ortiz, Sector Padilla, Sector Quiles, Sector Rincón, Sector Romero, Sector Solís, Sector Zamora, Urbanización San Andrés, and Vuelta del Dos.

== History ==
Palomas was in Spain's gazetteers until Puerto Rico was ceded by Spain in the aftermath of the Spanish–American War under the terms of the Treaty of Paris of 1898 and became an unincorporated territory of the United States. In 1899, the United States Department of War conducted a census of Puerto Rico finding that the population of Palomas barrio was 1,091.

Historical population
Census	Pop.	Note	%±
1900	1,091		—
1910	1,260		15.5%
1920	1,995		58.3%
1930	3,158		58.3%
1940	3,915		24.0%
1950	2,809		−28.3%
1960	3,697		31.6%
1970	0		−100.0%
1980	3,230		—
1990	4,666		44.5%
2000	4,382		−6.1%
2010	4,719		7.7%
U.S. Decennial Census; 1899 (shown as 1900) 1910-1930; 1930-1950 1980-2000 2010

== See also ==
- List of communities in Puerto Rico
