= Río Hondo, Comerío, Puerto Rico =

Barrio of Puerto Rico

Río Hondo
- Barrio
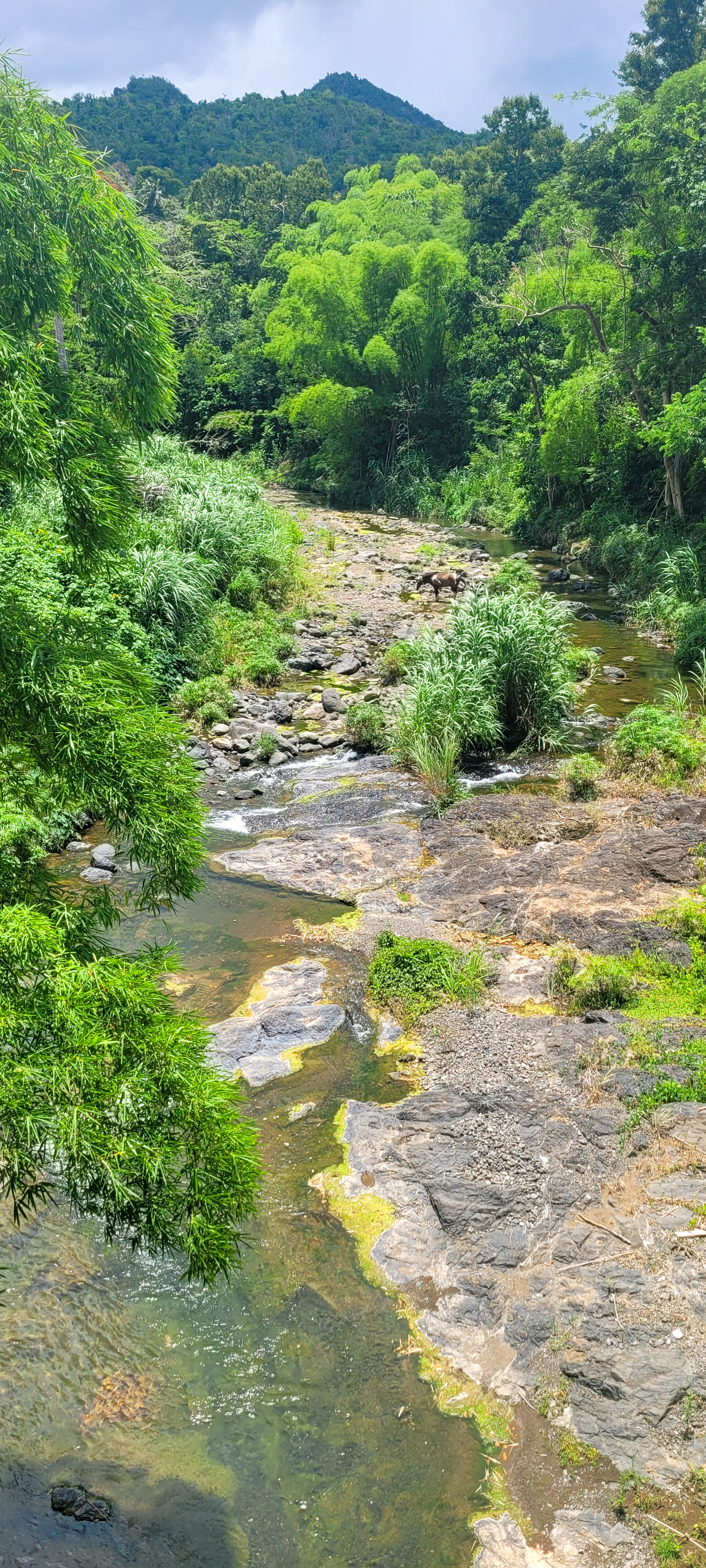
- Hondo River in Río Hondo barrio

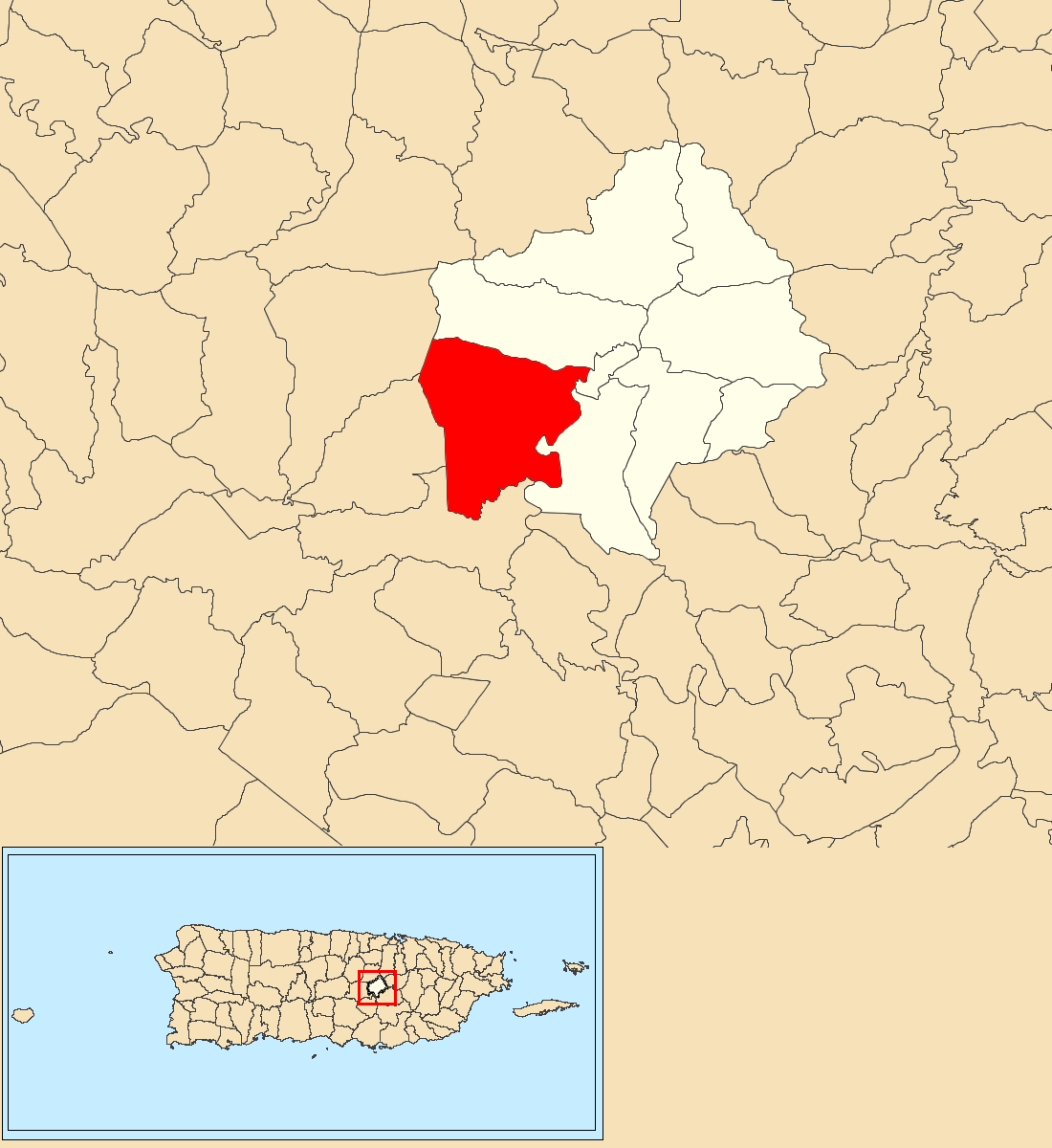
- Location of Río Hondo within the municipality of Comerío shown in red

- Location of Puerto Rico
- Coordinates: 18°12′34″N 66°15′30″W
- Commonwealth: Puerto Rico
- Municipality: Comerío

Area
  - Total: 5.25 sq mi (13.6 km^{2})
  - Land: 5.22 sq mi (13.5 km^{2})
  - Water: 0.03 sq mi (0.078 km^{2})
- Elevation: 1,342 ft (409 m)

Population (2010)
  - Total: 2,300
  - Density: 440.6/sq mi (170.1/km^{2})
- Source: 2010 Census
- Time zone: UTC−4 (AST)
- ZIP Code: 00782
- Area code: 787/939

Río Hondo is a barrio in the municipality of Comerío, Puerto Rico. Its population in 2010 was 2300.

Río Hondo, a river, is located in this barrio.

== Sectors ==
Barrios (which are, in contemporary times, roughly comparable to minor civil divisions) in turn are further subdivided into smaller local populated place areas/units called sectores (sectors in English). The types of sectores may vary, from normally sector to urbanización to reparto to barriada to residencial, among others.

The following sectors are in Río Hondo:

Carretera R774, Carretera R-776, Comerío Elderly, Sector Bordones, Sector El Llano, Sector El Tigre, Sector La Guitarra, Sector La Juncia, Sector La Loma, Sector La Paila, Sector La Puntilla, Sector Los Ocasio, Sector Los Ruiz, Sector Parcelas, Sector Quebrada Grande and Urbanización Sabana del Palmar.

Historical population
Census	Pop.	Note	%±
1900	1,161		—
1910	1,736		49.5%
1920	2,057		18.5%
1930	2,299		11.8%
1940	2,432		5.8%
1950	2,074		−14.7%
1960	1,869		−9.9%
1970	0		−100.0%
1980	1,317		—
1990	1,639		24.4%
2000	1,857		13.3%
2010	2,300		23.9%
U.S. Decennial Census; 1899 (shown as 1900) 1910-1930; 1930-1950 1980-2000 2010

== History ==
Río Hondo was in Spain's gazetteers until Puerto Rico was ceded by Spain in the aftermath of the Spanish–American War under the terms of the Treaty of Paris of 1898 and became an unincorporated territory of the United States. In 1899, the United States Department of War conducted a census of Puerto Rico finding that the population of Río Hondo barrio was 1,161.

== Gallery ==
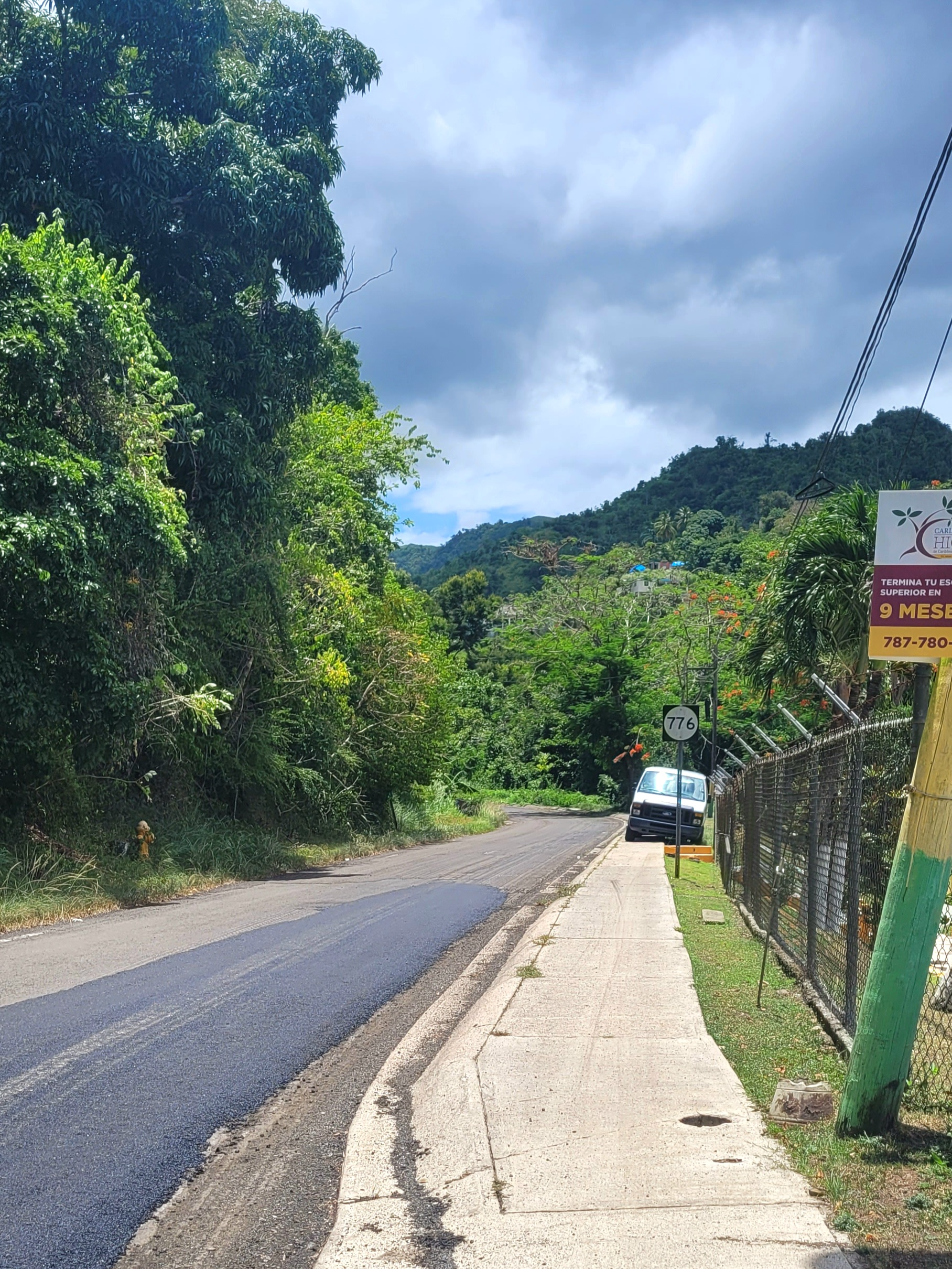
Puerto Rico Highway 776 in Río Hondo

== See also ==
- List of communities in Puerto Rico
