= Doña Elena, Comerío, Puerto Rico =

Barrio of Puerto Rico

Doña Elena
- Barrio
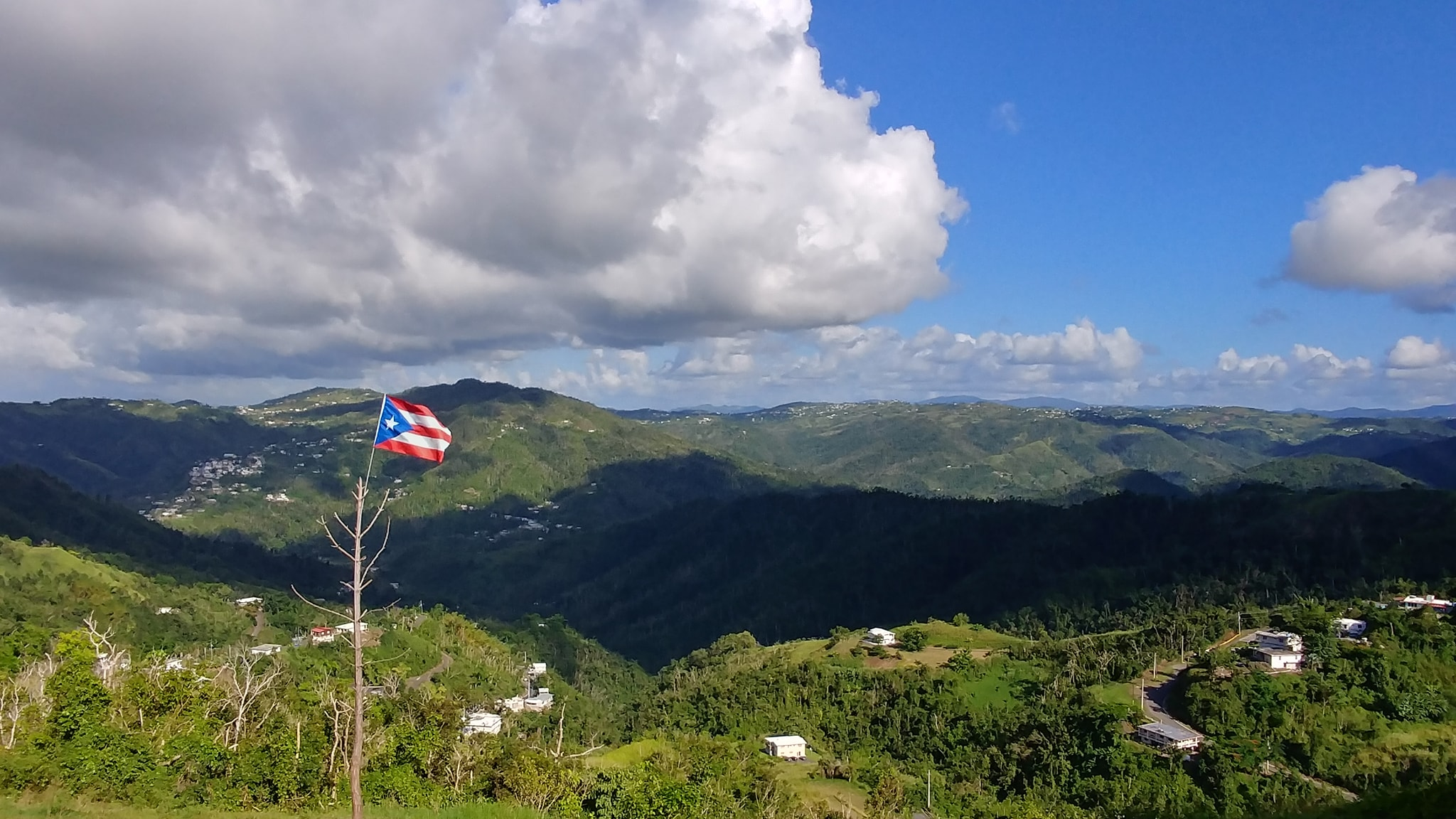
- Hilltop view from Doña Elena

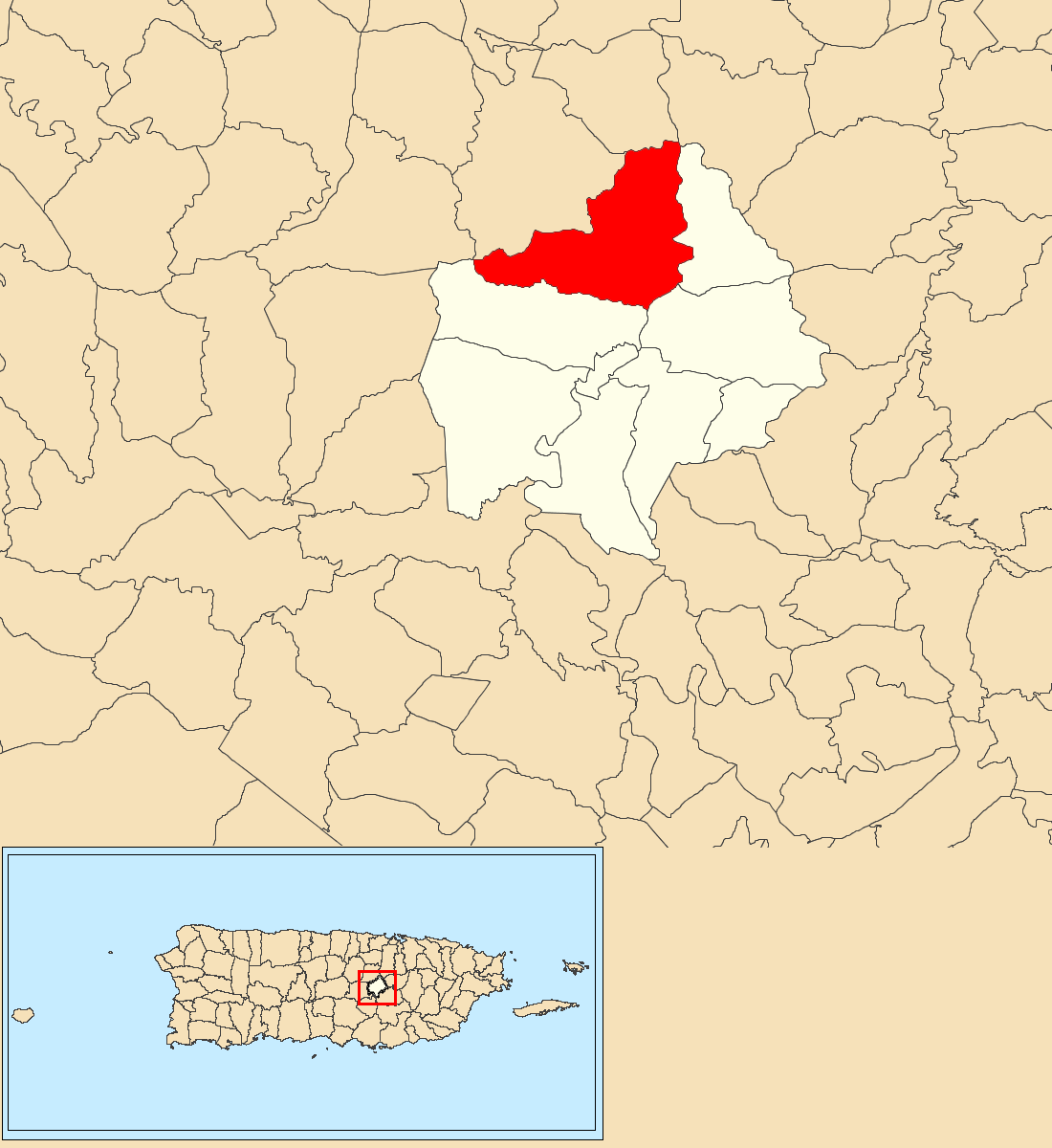
- Location of Doña Elena within the municipality of Comerío shown in red

- Location of Puerto Rico
- Coordinates: 18°15′06″N 66°12′59″W
- Commonwealth: Puerto Rico
- Municipality: Comerío

Area
  - Total: 4.91 sq mi (12.7 km^{2})
  - Land: 4.87 sq mi (12.6 km^{2})
  - Water: 0.04 sq mi (0.10 km^{2})
- Elevation: 1,470 ft (450 m)

Population (2010)
  - Total: 3,252
  - Density: 667.8/sq mi (257.8/km^{2})
- Source: 2010 Census
- Time zone: UTC−4 (AST)
- ZIP Code: 00782
- Area code: 787/939

Doña Elena is a barrio in the municipality of Comerío, Puerto Rico. Its population in 2010 was 3,252.

== Sectors ==
Barrios (which are, in contemporary times, roughly comparable to minor civil divisions) in turn are further subdivided into smaller local populated place areas/units called sectores (sectors in English). The types of sectores may vary, from normally sector to urbanización to reparto to barriada to residencial, among others.

The following sectors are in Doña Elena:

Doña Elena Abajo, Parts of PR-Highway 780, Ramal 7780 and Ramal 8809, Sector Ayala, Sector Bermúdez, Sector El Salto, Sector Figueroa, Sector Iglesia, Sector La Cocora, Sector La Línea, Sector La Loma, Sector La Tosca (Carretera 815), Sector Los Martínez, Sector Los Perniles, Sector Los Pinos, Sector Media Luna, Sector Parcelas, Sector Puente Las Palomas, and Sector Villas de Doña Elena.

== History ==
Doña Elena was in Spain's gazetteers until Puerto Rico was ceded by Spain in the aftermath of the Spanish–American War under the terms of the Treaty of Paris of 1898 and became an unincorporated territory of the United States. In 1899, the United States Department of War conducted a census of Puerto Rico finding that the population of Doña Elena barrio was 1,460.

Historical population
Census	Pop.	Note	%±
1900	1,460		—
1910	1,837		25.8%
1920	2,336		27.2%
1930	2,365		1.2%
1940	2,289		−3.2%
1950	1,498		−34.6%
1960	2,276		51.9%
1970	2,421		6.4%
1980	2,646		9.3%
1990	2,759		4.3%
2000	2,966		7.5%
2010	3,252		9.6%
U.S. Decennial Census; 1899 (shown as 1900) 1910-1930; 1930-1950 1980-2000 2010

== Gallery ==
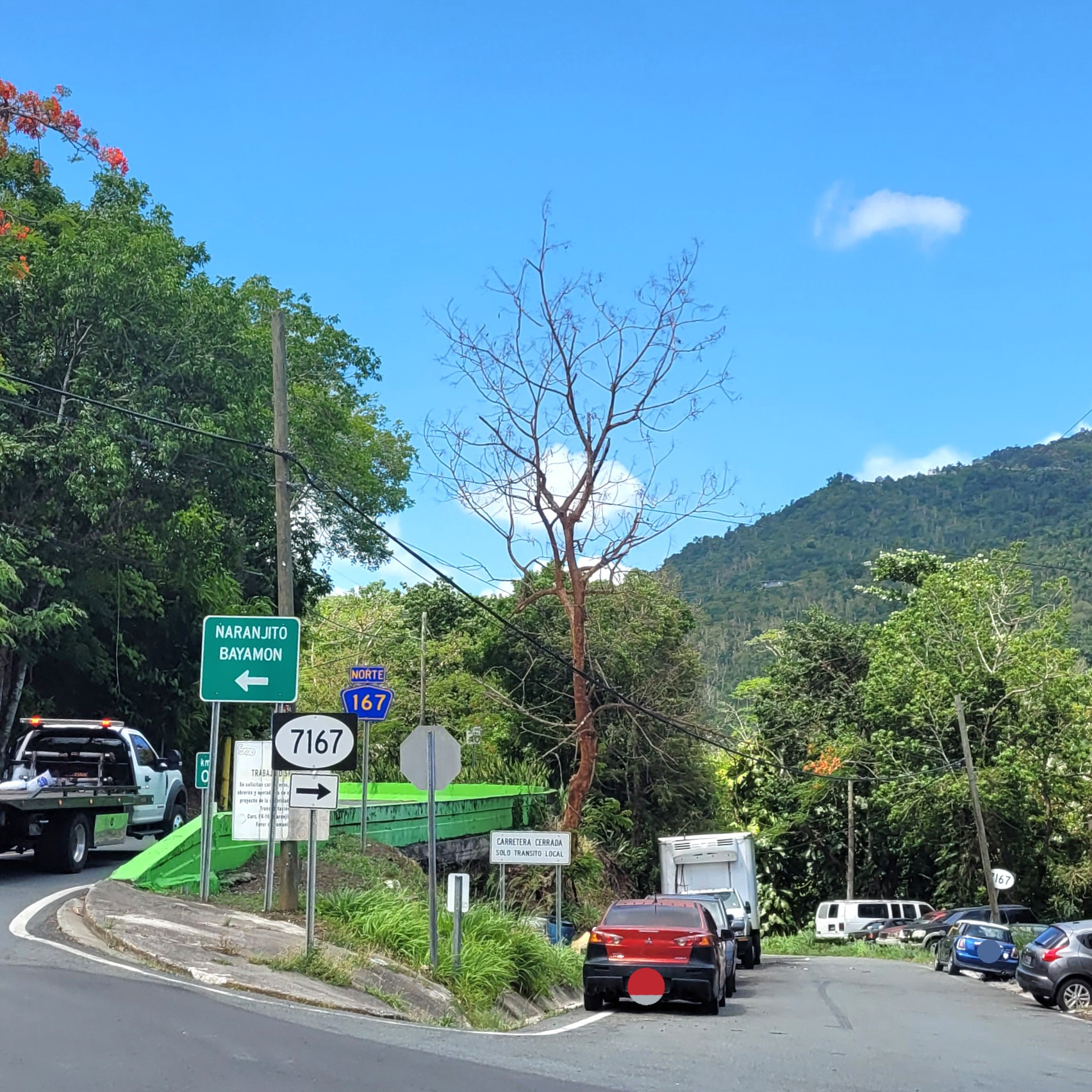
Puerto Rico Highway 156 at its junction with Puerto Rico Highway 167 and Puerto Rico Highway 7167 in Doña Elena

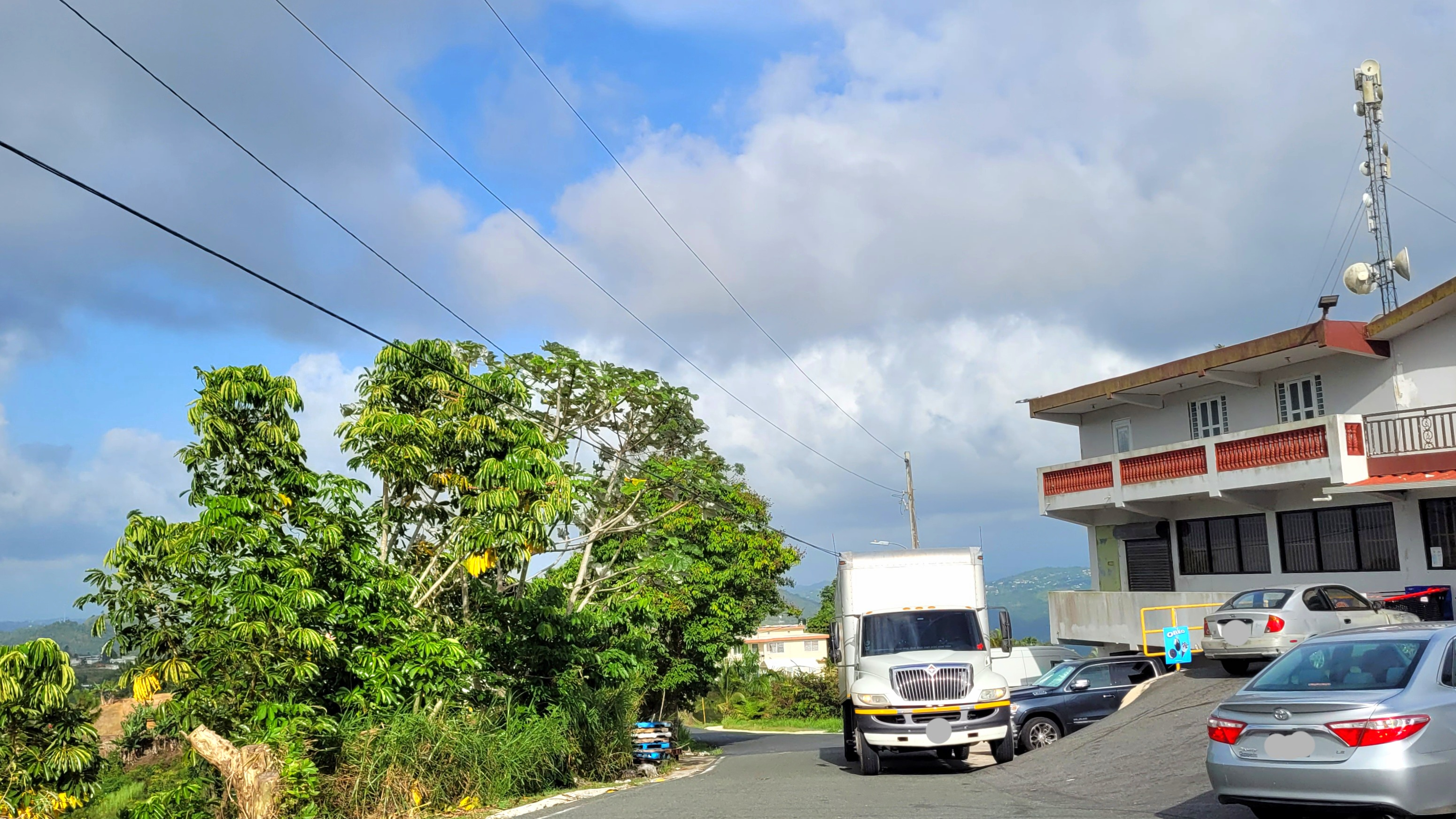
Puerto Rico Highway 7780 in Doña Elena

== See also ==
- List of communities in Puerto Rico
