= Comerío barrio-pueblo =

Historical and administrative center (seat) of Comerío, Puerto Rico

Comerío barrio-pueblo Pueblo de Comerío
- Municipality seat
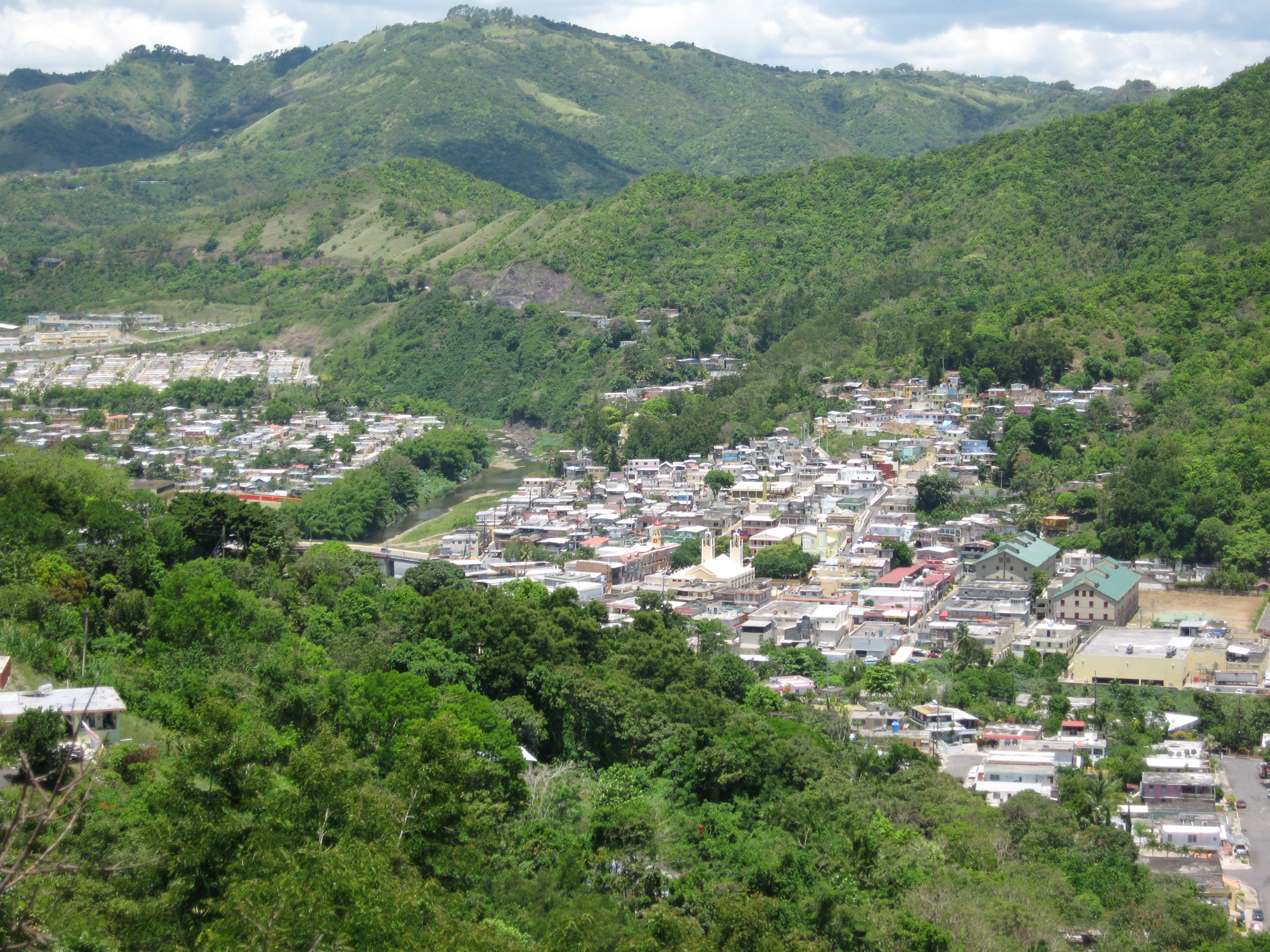
- View of Comerío Pueblo from Lazos Hill

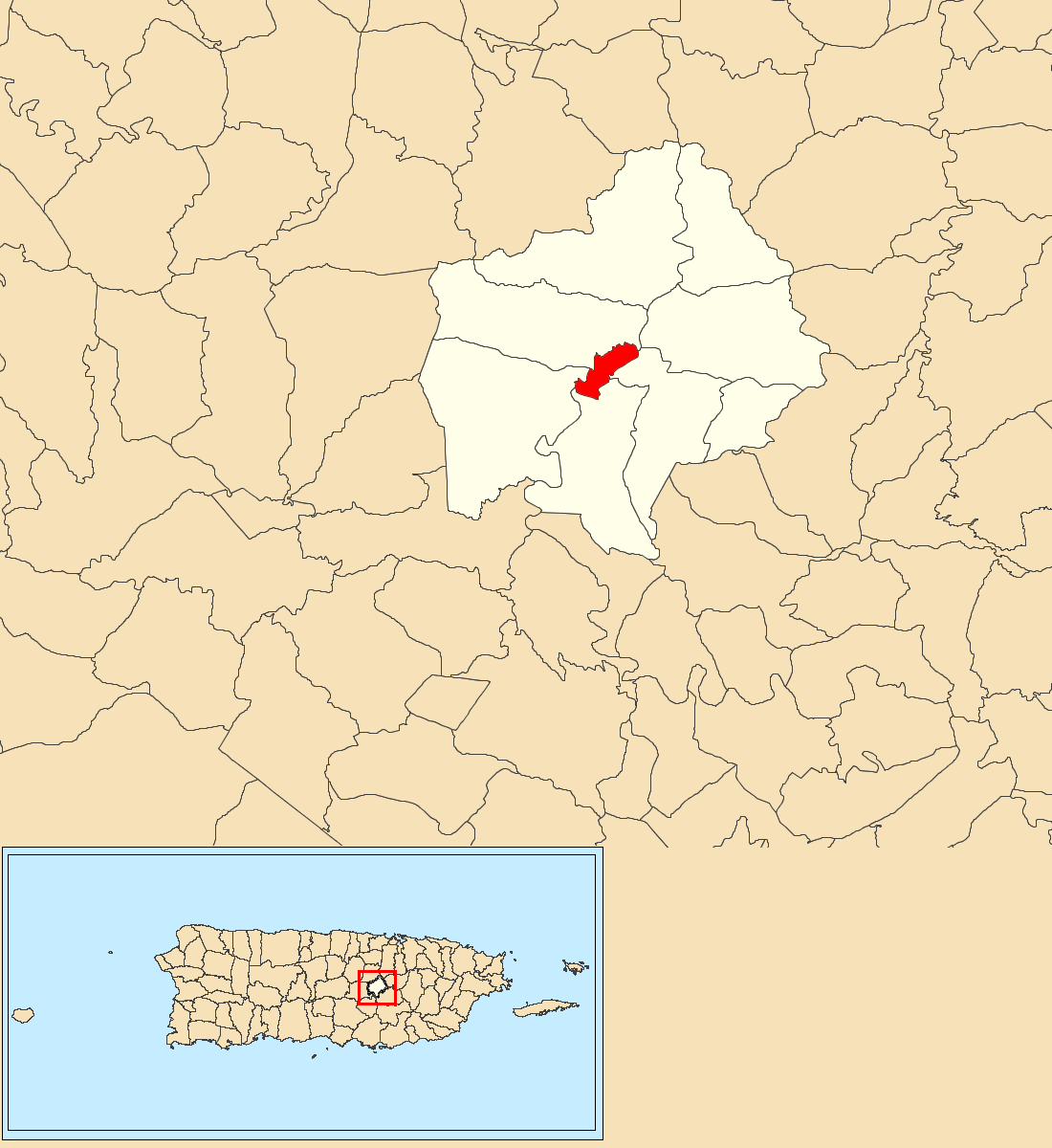
- Location of Comerío barrio-pueblo within the municipality of Comerío shown in red

- Location of Puerto Rico
- Coordinates: 18°13′10″N 66°13′30″W
- Commonwealth: Puerto Rico
- Municipality: Comerío

Area
  - Total: 0.40 sq mi (1.0 km^{2})
  - Land: 0.39 sq mi (1.0 km^{2})
  - Water: 0.01 sq mi (0.026 km^{2})
- Elevation: 623 ft (190 m)

Population (2010)
  - Total: 3,657
  - Density: 9,376.9/sq mi (3,620.4/km^{2})
- Source: 2010 Census
- Time zone: UTC−4 (AST)
- ZIP Code: 00782
- Area code: 787/939

Comerío barrio-pueblo is a barrio and the administrative center (seat) of Comerío, a municipality of Puerto Rico. Its population in 2010 was 3,657.

== Sectors ==
Barrios (which are, in contemporary times, roughly comparable to minor civil divisions) in turn are further subdivided into smaller local populated place areas/units called sectores (sectors in English). The types of sectores may vary, from normally sector to urbanización to reparto to barriada to residencial, among others.

The following sectors are in Comerío barrio-pueblo:

Área Industrial, Barriada Cielito, Barriada Pasarell, Calle Acueducto, Carretera 778, Casco del Pueblo, Condominios Monte Flor, Cuba Libre, La Aldea, Las Nereidas, Palomas Abajo, Parts of Puerto Rico Highway 167, Residencial Ariel, Residencial Manuel Martorell, Sector 110, Sector Cipey, Sector El 26, Sector Higüero, Sector La Loma, Sector Las Casitas, Sector Lazos, Sector Paloma Abajo, Sector Villegas, Sector Vuelta del Dos, Urbanización Ariel, Urbanización Río Plata, and Villa Monsito.

== History ==
As was customary in Spain, in Puerto Rico, the municipality has a barrio called pueblo which contains a central plaza, the municipal buildings (city hall), and a Catholic church. Fiestas patronales (patron saint festivals) are held in the central plaza every year.

Comerío barrio-pueblo was in Spain's gazetteers until Puerto Rico was ceded by Spain in the aftermath of the Spanish–American War under the terms of the Treaty of Paris of 1898 and became an unincorporated territory of the United States. In 1899, the United States Department of War conducted a census of Puerto Rico finding that the population of Comerío Pueblo barrio was 1,191.

Historical population
Census	Pop.	Note	%±
1900	1,191		—
1910	1,908		60.2%
1920	2,383		24.9%
1930	2,502		5.0%
1940	2,774		10.9%
1950	5,031		81.4%
1960	5,232		4.0%
1970	0		−100.0%
1980	5,302		—
1990	4,439		−16.3%
2000	4,103		−7.6%
2010	3,657		−10.9%
U.S. Decennial Census; 1899 (shown as 1900) 1910-1930; 1930-1950 1980-2000 2010

== The central plaza and its church ==
The central plaza, or square, is a place for official and unofficial recreational events and a place where people can gather and socialize from dusk to dawn. The Laws of the Indies, Spanish law, which regulated life in Puerto Rico in the early 19th century, stated the plaza's purpose was for "the parties" (celebrations, festivities) (Spanish: a propósito para las fiestas), and that the square should be proportionally large enough for the number of neighbors (Spanish: grandeza proporcionada al número de vecinos). These Spanish regulations also stated that the streets nearby should be comfortable portals for passersby, protecting them from the elements: sun and rain.

Located across from the central plaza is the Parroquia Santo Cristo de la Salud, a Roman Catholic church. Other churches have existed in the location since 1829 but the current church was inaugurated in the 1970s.

== See also ==
- List of communities in Puerto Rico
