= List of bridges documented by the Historic American Engineering Record in Puerto Rico =

This is a list of bridges documented by the Historic American Engineering Record in Puerto Rico.

== Bridges ==
Survey No.	Name (as assigned by HAER)	Status	Type	Built	Documented	Carries	Crosses	Location	Municipality	Coordinates
PR-29	Puente de los Frailes	Extant	Brick arch	1855	1977	PR-873	Frailes Creek	Chalet de la Colina	San Juan	18°21′07″N 66°05′29″W
PR-33	Batey Columbia Railroad Bridge	Demolished	Warren truss	1935	1993	Central Columbia sugar mill railroad	Maunabo River	Calzada	Maunabo	18°00′17″N 65°54′18″W
PR-34	Puente Blanco Bridge	Replaced	Reinforced concrete cast-in-place slab	1943	1997	PR-5	Canal de Malaria	Las Palmas	Cataño	18°25′49″N 66°08′13″W
PR-35	Puente San Antonio	Replaced	Steel girder	1925	1998	PR-1 (Luis Muñoz Rivera Avenue)	Caño San Antonio	Puerta de Tierra and Miramar	San Juan	18°27′33″N 66°05′14″W
PR-36	Puente Guillermo Esteves	Extant	Steel girder	1927	1998	PR-25 (Juan Ponce de León Avenue)	Caño San Antonio	Puerta de Tierra and Miramar	San Juan	18°27′34″N 66°05′11″W
PR-37	Puente Ferroviario San Antonio	Extant	Reinforced concrete closed spandrel arch	1932	1998	American Railroad	Caño San Antonio	Puerta de Tierra and Miramar	San Juan	18°27′34″N 66°05′13″W
PR-38	Puente de la Marina	Bypassed	Reinforced concrete cast-in-place slab	1918	2000		Río Grande de Loíza	Florida and Cerro Gordo	San Lorenzo	18°11′23″N 65°57′31″W
PR-39	Puente del Caño Perdomo	Replaced	Steel girder	1927	2001	PR-2	Caño Perdomo	Tanamá	Arecibo	18°28′00″N 66°43′04″W
PR-40	Puente del Caño Carate	Bypassed	Steel girder	1927	2001	PR-2	Caño Carate	Tanamá	Arecibo	18°27′57″N 66°42′59″W
PR-41	Puente del Caño San Francisco	Bypassed	Steel girder	1927	2001	PR-2	Caño San Francisco	Tanamá and Cambalache	Arecibo	18°27′59″N 66°42′50″W
PR-42	Puente del Río Grande de Arecibo	Demolished	Steel girder	1927	2001	PR-2	Río Grande de Arecibo	Cambalache	Arecibo	18°28′01″N 66°42′43″W
PR-44	Puente del Río Hondo	Extant	Double-intersection Warren truss	1876	2002	PR-156	Río Hondo	Río Hondo	Comerío	18°12′32″N 66°14′35″W
