= Puerto Rico Highway 34 =

Highway in Puerto Rico

Highway 34
- Ruta 34

Route information
- Maintained by Puerto Rico DTPW
- Length: 5.9 km (3.7 mi)

Major junctions
- West end: PR-196 in Cañabón
- PR-156 in Cañabón; PR-784 in Cañaboncito; PR-52 in Cañaboncito; PR-1 in Caguas barrio-pueblo; PR-32 in Turabo; PR-788 in Tomás de Castro; PR-789 in Tomás de Castro
- East end: PR-183 in Tomás de Castro

Location
- Country: United States
- Territory: Puerto Rico
- Municipalities: Caguas

Highway system
- Roads in Puerto Rico; List
← PR-33	→ PR-35

Puerto Rico Highway 34 (PR-34) is an urban road located in Caguas, Puerto Rico. This road extends from Avenida José Garrido (PR-196) in Cañabón barrio to PR-183 in Tomás de Castro barrio, and is part of Turabo and Degetau avenues.

== Route description ==
This road intersects with PR-156 and PR-784 as Avenida Turabo in the west side of the city. Then it intersects with Autopista Luis A. Ferré (PR-52), Avenida José Gautier Benítez (PR-1) and Avenida Luis Muñoz Marín (PR-32) as Avenida Degetau. On September 9, 2021, an extension to the east side of the city was opened as Avenida Extensión Degetau. This avenue is located between PR-32 and PR-183 in Tomás de Castro barrio.

== Major intersections ==
The entire route is located in Caguas.

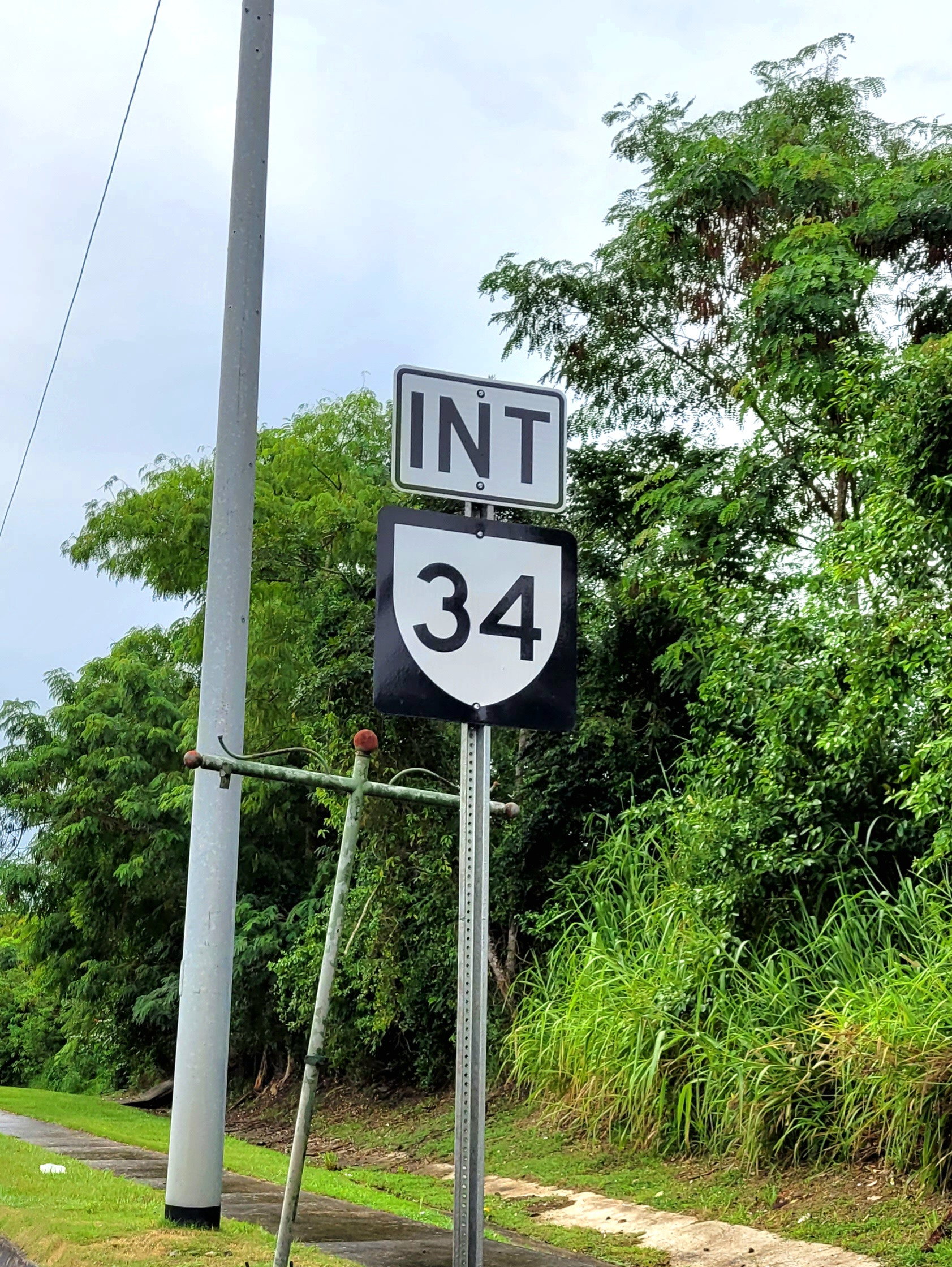
PR-196 west approaching PR-34 intersection in Cañabón

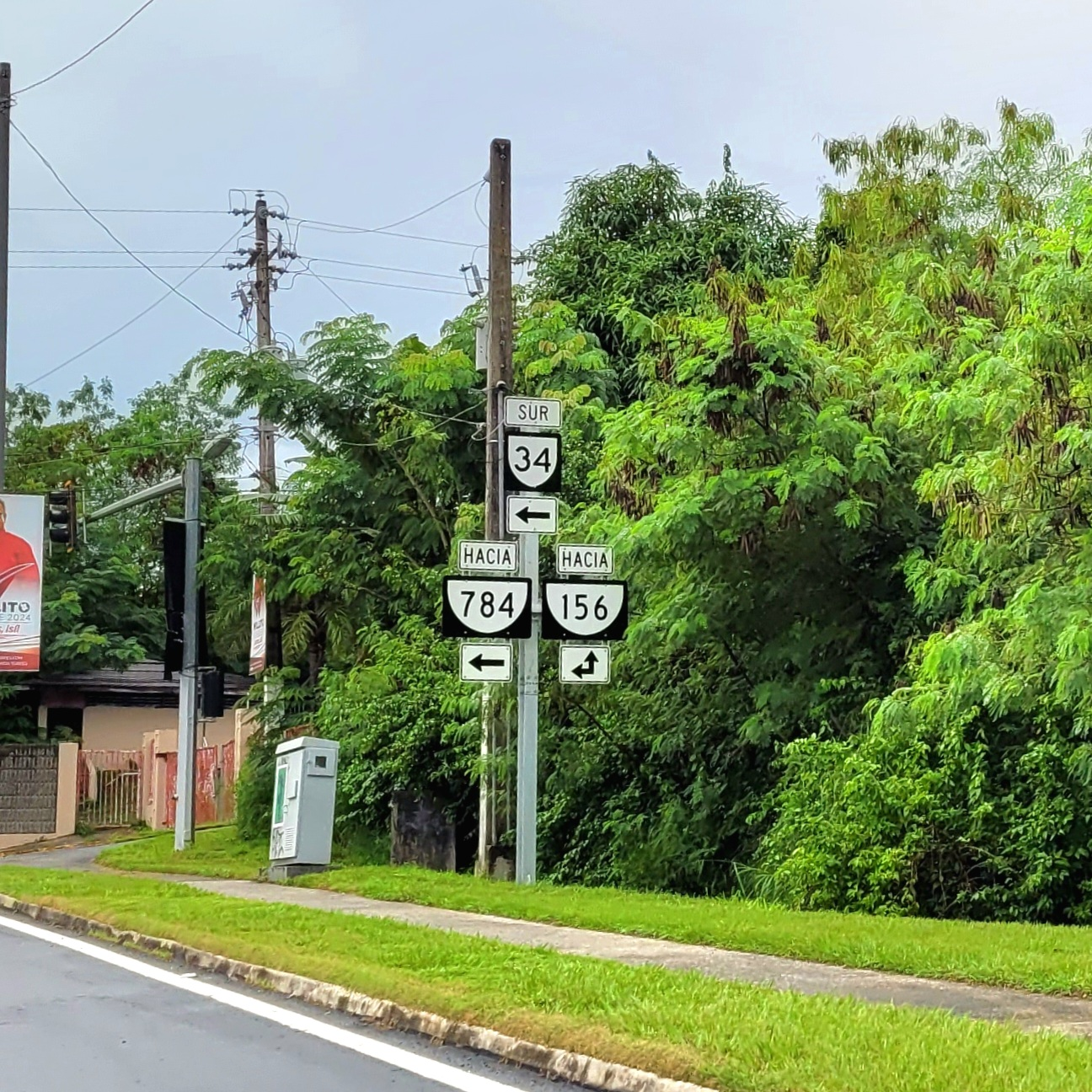
PR-196 west at PR-34 intersection in Cañabón

Location	km	mi	Destinations	Notes
Cañabón	0.0	0.0	PR-196 (Avenida José Garrido) to PR-52 (Autopista Luis A. Ferré) – Caguas	Western terminus of PR-34
Cañabón	1.0	0.62	PR-156 (Avenida Joviniano Ríos Mercado) – Caguas, Aguas Buenas	
Cañaboncito	1.7	1.1	PR-784 west – Caguas	Southern terminus of PR-34 through Avenida Turabo; western terminus of PR-34 through Avenida Federico Degetau
Cañaboncito	2.6	1.6	PR-52 (Autopista Luis A. Ferré) – San Juan, Ponce	PR-52 exit 20; diamond interchange
Caguas barrio-pueblo	3.3	2.1	PR-1 (Avenida José Gautier Benítez) – Caguas, Cayey	Eastern terminus of PR-34 through Avenida Federico Degetau; western terminus of PR-34 through Avenida Extensión Federico Degetau
Turabo	4.2	2.6	PR-32 (Avenida Luis Muñoz Marín) – Cayey, San Lorenzo	
Tomás de Castro	4.8	3.0	PR-788 – Tomás de Castro	
Tomás de Castro	5.4	3.4	PR-789 – Tomás de Castro	
Tomás de Castro	5.9	3.7	PR-183 – Caguas, San Lorenzo	Eastern terminus of PR-34; seagull intersection
1.000 mi = 1.609 km; 1.000 km = 0.621 mi: Route transition
