= Puerto Rico Highway 196 =

Highway in Puerto Rico

Highway 196
- Ruta 196
- Avenida José Garrido

Route information
- Maintained by Puerto Rico DTPW
- Length: 2.8 km (1.7 mi)

Major junctions
- West end: PR-156 in Cañabón
- PR-34 in Cañabón; PR-52 in Bairoa
- East end: PR-1 in Caguas barrio-pueblo

Location
- Country: United States
- Territory: Puerto Rico
- Municipalities: Caguas

Highway system
- Roads in Puerto Rico; List
← PR-195	→ PR-198

Puerto Rico Highway 196 (PR-196) is an urban road in Caguas, Puerto Rico. This road goes from PR-156 in Cañabón to PR-1 near Bairoa, and it is known as Avenida José Garrido.

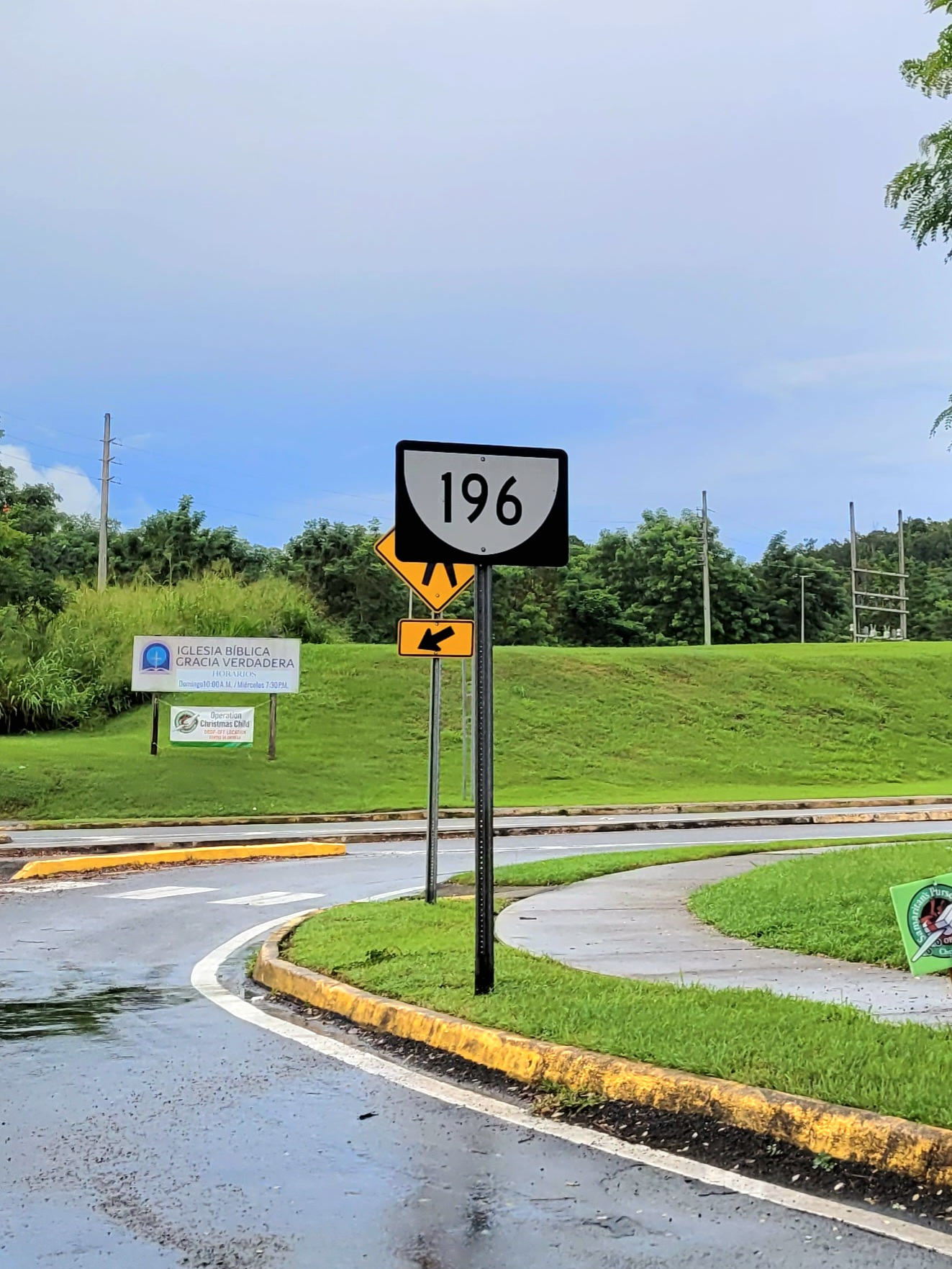
Sign for PR-196 in Cañabón, looking west

== Major intersections ==
The entire route is located in Caguas.

Location	km	mi	Destinations	Notes
Cañabón	0.0	0.0	PR-156 (Avenida Joviniano Ríos Mercado) – Caguas, Aguas Buenas	Western terminus of PR-196
Cañabón	1.3	0.81	PR-34 east (Avenida Turabo) – Caguas	
Bairoa	2.0– 2.3	1.2– 1.4	PR-52 (Autopista Luis A. Ferré) – San Juan, Ponce	PR-52 exit 18; diamond interchange
Caguas barrio-pueblo	2.8	1.7	PR-1 – Caguas, San Juan	Eastern terminus of PR-196
1.000 mi = 1.609 km; 1.000 km = 0.621 mi
