= Fernando Norzagaray y Escudero =

Governor of Puerto Rico

Fernando Norzagaray
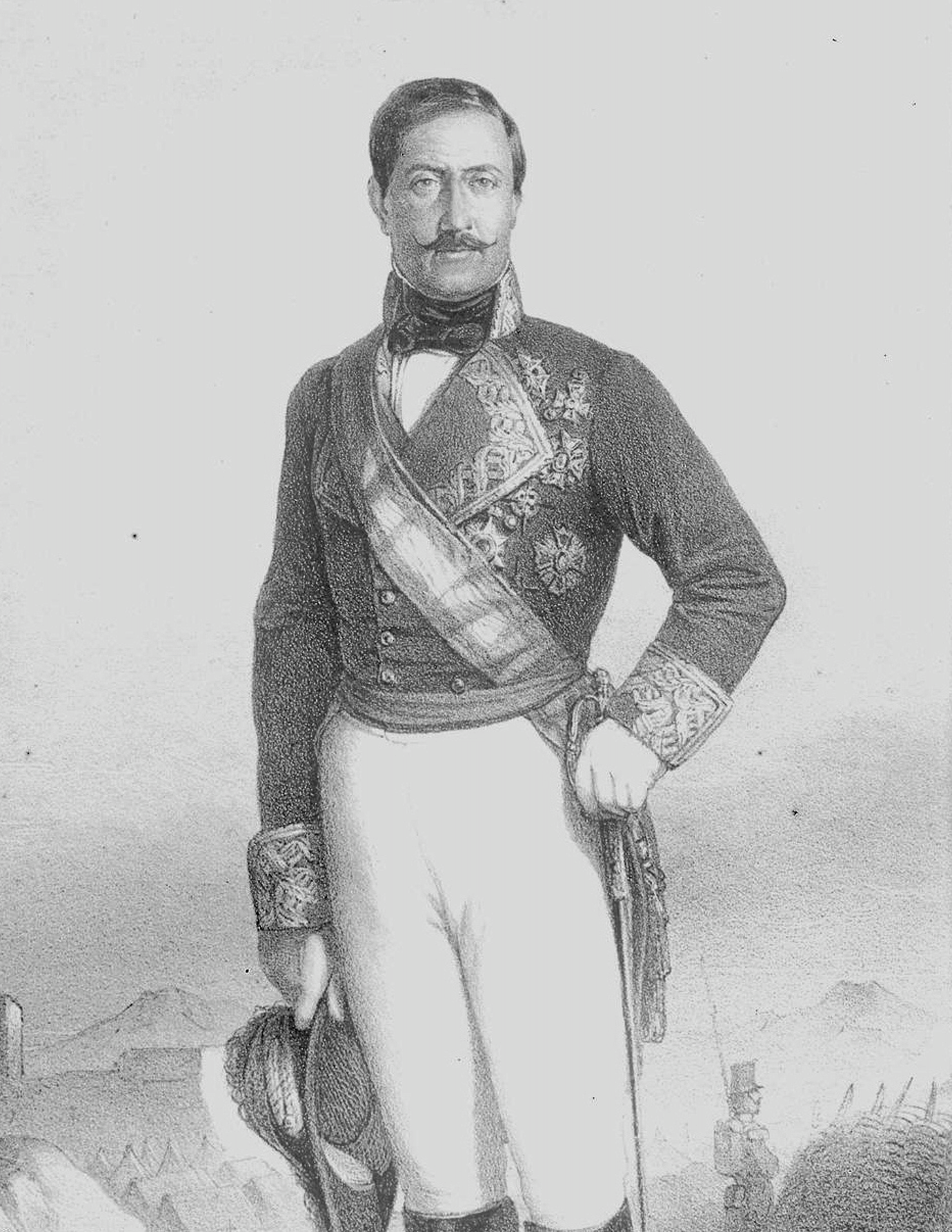

78th Governor-General of the Philippines
- In office 9 March 1857 – 12 January 1860
- Monarch: Isabella II of Spain
- Preceded by: Ramón Montero
- Succeeded by: Ramón María Solano

104th Governor of Puerto Rico
- In office May 1852 – January 1855
- Preceded by: Enrique de España y Taberner
- Succeeded by: Andrés García Gamba

Personal details
- Born: Fernando María Félix Mateo Juan Nepomuceno de Norzagaray y Escudero; 19 July 1808 San Sebastián, Spain
- Died: 12 September 1860 (aged 52) Madrid, Spain

Military service
- Allegiance: Kingdom of Spain
- Rank: Lieutenant-General

Fernando María Félix Mateo Juan Nepomuceno de Norzagaray y Escudero (19 July 1808 - 12 September 1860) was a Spanish soldier and colonial governor. Of Basque descent, he was a lieutenant general before becoming the 104th Governor of Puerto Rico and the 78th Governor of the Philippines under Spanish colonial rule. He also had a political career in Spain. In 1840 he was briefly Minister of War. On his return to Spain in 1860, he was made a senator, but he died the same year.

== Early life ==
Norzagaray was born on 19 July 1808 in San Sebastián, Gipuzkoa, to military officer Fernando José Norzagaray y Casado, of Talavera de la Reina, and María Estefanía Faustina Juliana Escudero y Villanueva, of Pamplona. He was baptized on 29 July at the Basilica of Saint Mary of the Chorus, also in San Sebastián.

== Puerto Rico ==
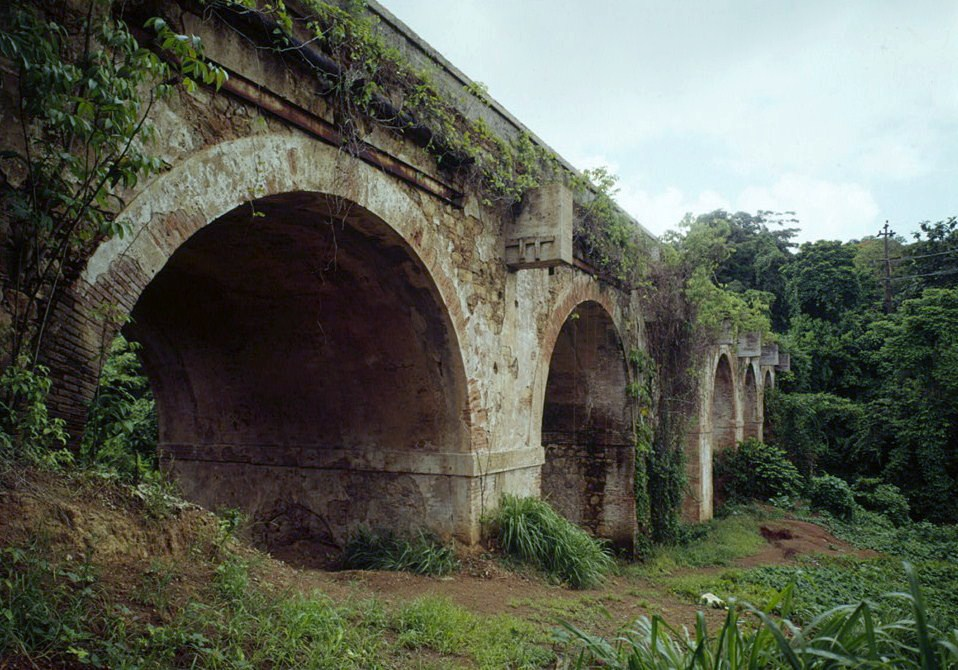
General Norzagaray Bridge in Tortugo, San Juan

He did extensive infrastructure work in Puerto Rico. One example is the General Norzagaray Bridge, which crosses the Los Frailes stream. Arsenals were constructed, and a cavalry was created.

== Philippines ==
Norzagaray authorized establishments of houses of foreign currency exchange on 18 June 1857, just two months after his ascendancy to governor. He ordered local administration reforms in September 1858 and reorganized the infantry in September 1859. In April 1859, ten Jesuit priests arrived in the Philippines, after being allowed again in the archipelago, to persuade Norzagaray to grant a Jesuit school be made. They were given the Escuela Municipal, which is the only primary school in Manila, on 1 October 1859. In 1858 he established a botanical garden, the Jardín Botánico, on the site now known as Mehan Garden.

== Cochinchina campaign ==
He sent Philippine troops to Cochinchina, southern Vietnam, in 1858 in a joint campaign with the French. Both Spain and France claimed to be defending Catholicism in Vietnam, with Spain reacting to the execution of bishop José María Díaz Sanjurjo at Nam Dinh, northern Vietnam, on 20 July 1857. The expedition raised hopes of increasing Philippine trade in Asia; however, Spain and its colony gained little long-term benefit from the four-year campaign.

At the Siege of Tourane, the Spanish navy was represented by the armed dispatch vessel El Cano, only one of the initial 13 warships used during the campaign. The transport included a marine artillery battery and 1,000 troops drawn from the Spanish garrison of the Philippines, mostly Tagalogs and Visayans. It was put under the command of the French Admiral Charles Rigault de Genouilly. The combined Franco-Spanish force was forced to evacuate Tourane, giving way to the Vietnamese. The same force was used in the Siege of Saigon, which was put under the same French admiral, and garnered a victory for the combined Franco-Spanish force.

In 1860, most of the Spanish forces under the command of Admiral Bernardo Ruiz de Lanzarote were withdrawn on French request. France went on to develop a colony in Vietnam.

== Legacy ==
In the Philippines, the town of Norzagaray, which was formerly known as Casay, was renamed in his honour. During his term, he separated Casay from Angat and made the former a distinct town.

A street in the Old San Juan Historic District is named Calle Norzagaray.

== Gallery ==
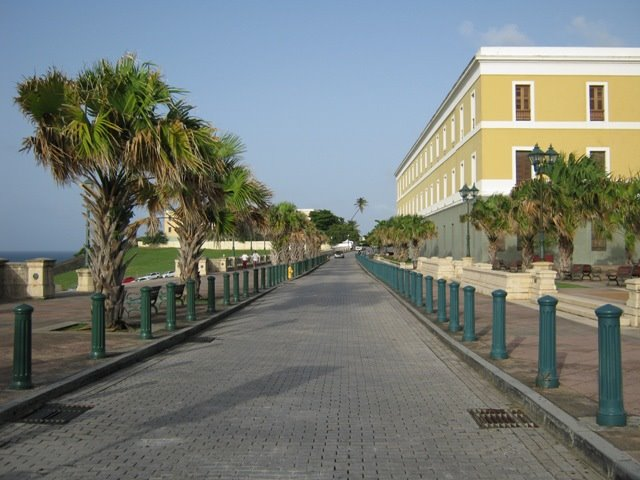
Calle Norzagaray in Old San Juan

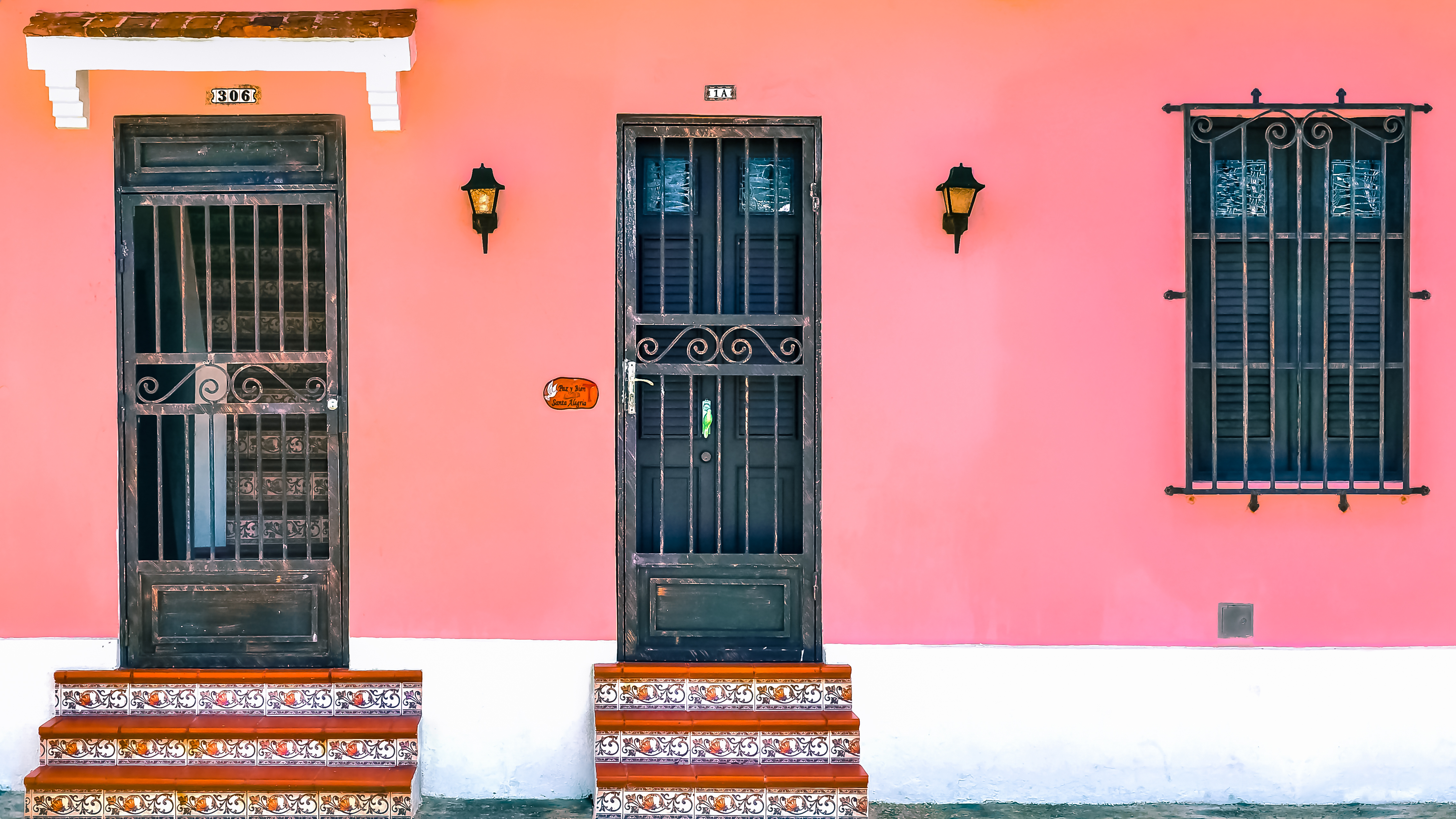
A pink house on Calle Norzagaray in Old San Juan

Government offices
Preceded by Enrique de España	Governor of Puerto Rico; May 1852 – January 1855	Succeeded by Andrés García Gamba
Preceded by Ramón Montero	Governor-General of the Philippines; March 9, 1857 – January 12, 1860	Succeeded by Ramón María Solano
