= General Norzagaray Bridge =

Bridge in San Juan, Puerto Rico

- U.S. National Register of Historic Places
- Puerto Rico Historic Sites and Zones
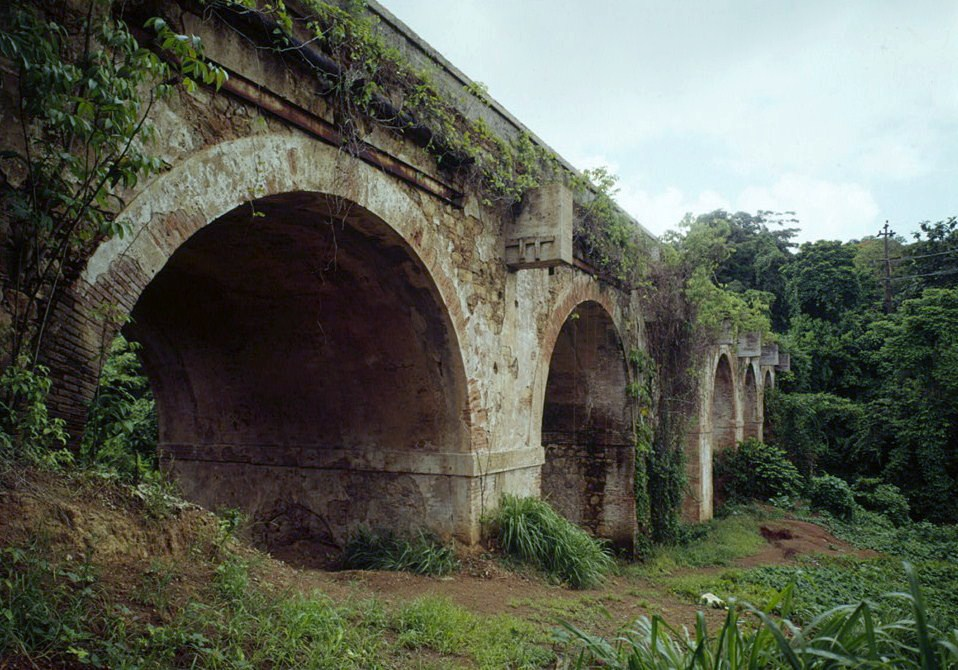

- Location within Puerto Rico
- Nearest city: San Juan, Puerto Rico
- Coordinates: 18.35186°N 66.09143°W
- Area: less than one acre
- Built: 1855, 1927
- Architect: Manuel Sanchez-Nunez y Layne
- Engineer: Gustavo Steinacher
- Architectural style: brick barrel vault
- MPS: Historic Bridges of Puerto Rico MPS
- NRHP reference No.: 95000833
- RNSZH No.: 2000-(RMSJ)-00-JP-SH

Significant dates
- Added to NRHP: July 19, 1995
- Designated RNSZH: February 3, 2000

The General Norzagaray Bridge is a brick and masonry barrel vault bridge built between 1854 and 1855 in San Juan, Puerto Rico. Also known as Puente de los Frailes, it brings what is now Puerto Rico Highway 873 across Frailes Creek, a tributary to the Guaynabo River. It has eight 9.8-metre (32 ft) barrel vault spans. Its total length is 120.7 metres (396 ft) and its roadway width is 7.00 metres (22.97 ft). It was listed on the National Register of Historic Places (NRHP) in 1995, and on the Puerto Rico Register of Historic Sites and Zones in 2000.

In 1855, it was important for carrying the Carretera Central across Quebrada Frailes.

It is named for Fernándo de Norzagaray y Escudero, governor of Puerto Rico from 1852 to 1855.

It was designed by chief engineer Manuel Sánchez-Nuñez y Layne and built by engineer Gustavo Steinacher (who also designed and built the first suspension bridge in the Caribbean, over the Cagüitas River just north of Caguas, Puerto Rico) and cost 45,346 pesos.

According to its NRHP registration, it "is one of the most impressive bridges from the Spanish Colonial period", serving as a "prime example of Spanish 19th century masonry arch technology". It is the only such example in the United States.

The superstructure of the bridge was modified in 1927 by removal of earth fill and addition of longitudinal steel girders installed on the arch piers to support a concrete deck; manholes in the pavement give access to this structure within a structure. Transverse tension rods cross the spandrel space to pull the walls together. The facade has also been altered with concrete projections, one over each pier, and with exposed steel strips that anchor the tension rods. These alterations do not interfere significantly with the historic integrity of the bridge.

The NRHP nomination places the bridge at kilometer 0.8 of Highway 873, in the barrios of Tortugo and Monacillos in San Juan.

== Plaque ==
The nomination records two 19th-century marble plaques on the bridge, carrying the names of the builders and designers and a dedication to Norzagaray. The plaque naming the builders was photographed in August 1977 by Jack Boucher for the Historic American Engineering Record (HAER), survey PR-29. Its inscription gives the start of construction as June 20, 1854, and completion as May 20, 1855, and reads:

ESTE PUENTE
PRINCIPIADO EL 20 DE JU
NIO DE 1854 Y CONCLUIDO
EL 20 DE MAYO DE 1855
SE EJECUTO POR EL INGE
NIERO D. GUSTAVO STEINA
CHER BAJO LOS PLANOS E
INSPECCION DEL COMAND
ANTE GRADUADO CAPITAN
DE INGENIEROS D. MANUEL
SANCHEZ NUÑEZ Y LAYNE

== Gallery ==
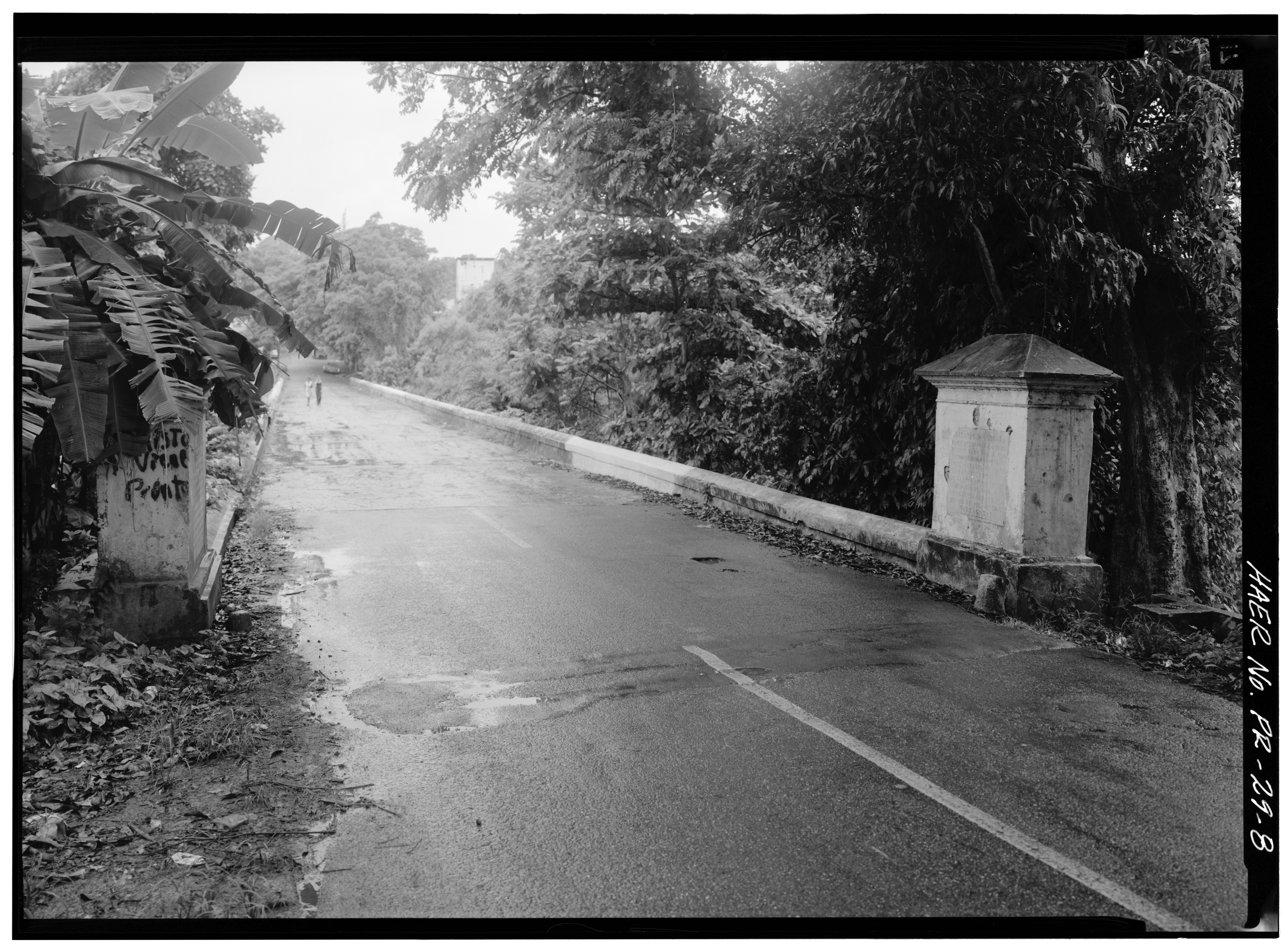
Norzagaray Bridge

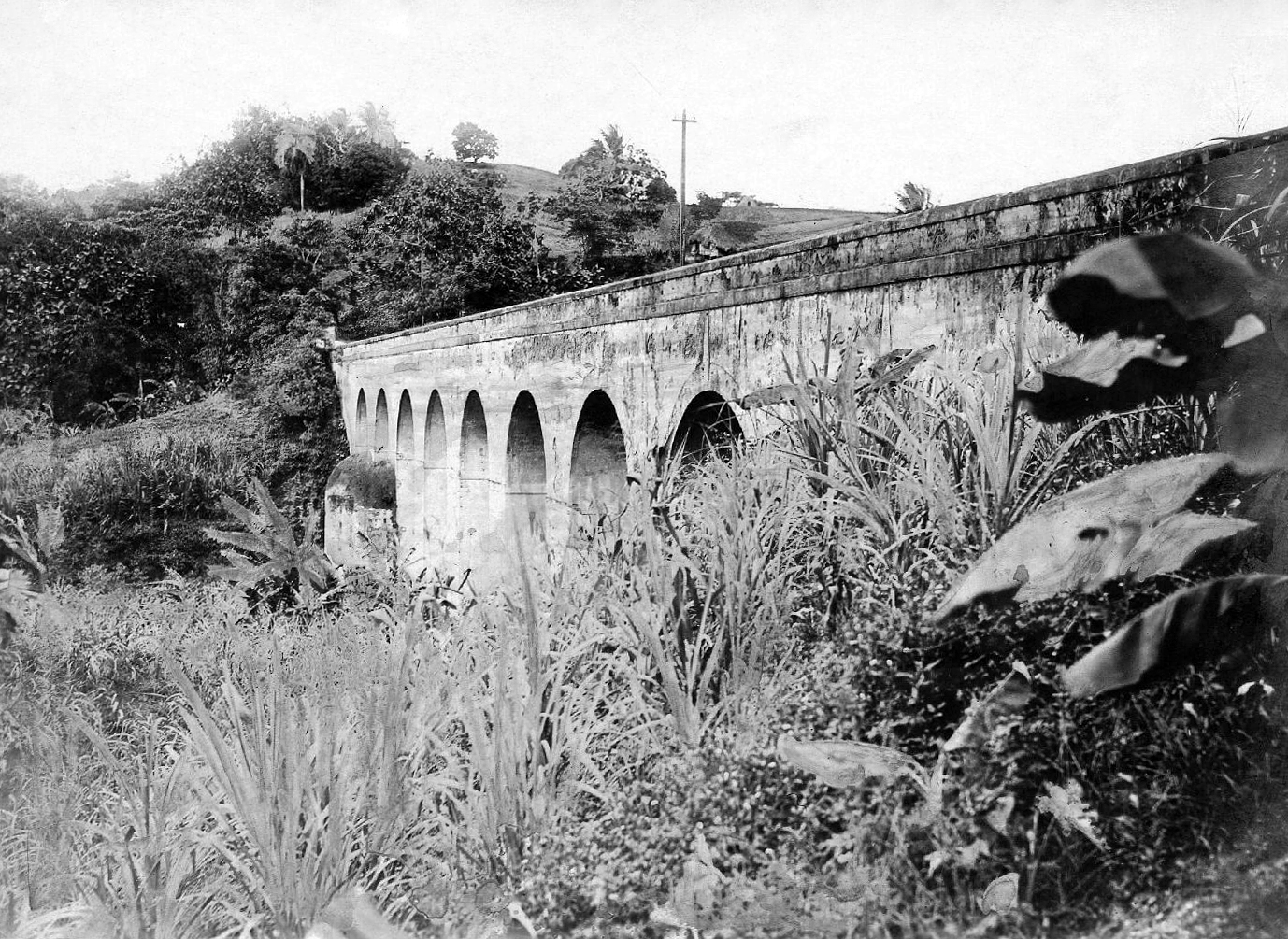
Norzagaray Bridge in 1906

== See also ==
- List of bridges documented by the Historic American Engineering Record in Puerto Rico
