= Puerto Rico Highway 156 =

Highway in Puerto Rico

Highway 156
- Ruta 156

Route information
- Maintained by Puerto Rico DTPW
- Length: 58.7 km (36.5 mi)
- Existed: 1953–present

Major junctions
- West end: PR-597 / PR-5155 in Orocovis barrio-pueblo–Orocovis
- PR-162 in Barranquitas barrio-pueblo; PR-152 in Barranquitas barrio-pueblo–Quebradillas; PR-167 / PR-7167 in Doña Elena; PR-172 in Naranjo; PR-173 in Mula–Sumidero; PR-174 in Aguas Buenas barrio-pueblo; PR-196 in Cañabón; PR-34 in Cañabón; PR-52 in Caguas barrio-pueblo; PR-33 in Caguas barrio-pueblo
- East end: PR-1P in Caguas barrio-pueblo

Location
- Country: United States
- Territory: Puerto Rico
- Municipalities: Orocovis, Barranquitas, Comerío, Aguas Buenas, Caguas

Highway system
- Roads in Puerto Rico; List
| ← PR-155 | → PR-157 |
| ← PR-5155 | PR-5156 | → PR-5506 |
| ← PR-6693 | PR-7156 | → PR-7173 |

Puerto Rico Highway 156 (PR-156) is a long east–west highway which connects Caguas to Orocovis, passing through Aguas Buenas, Comerío and Barranquitas. This route extends from its junction with PR-1 in downtown Caguas to PR-5155 in downtown Orocovis.

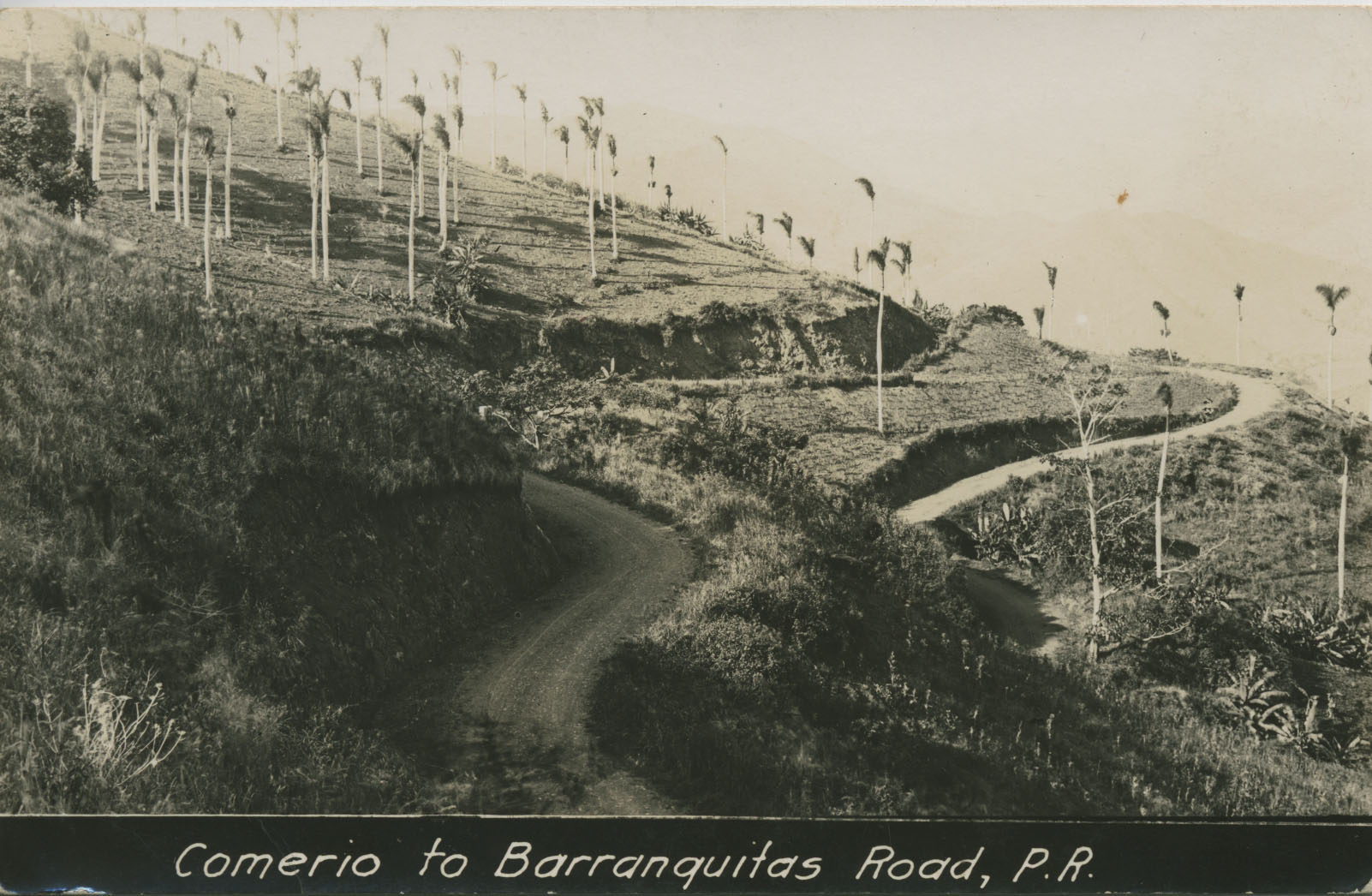
Comerío to Barranquitas Road (currently PR-156)

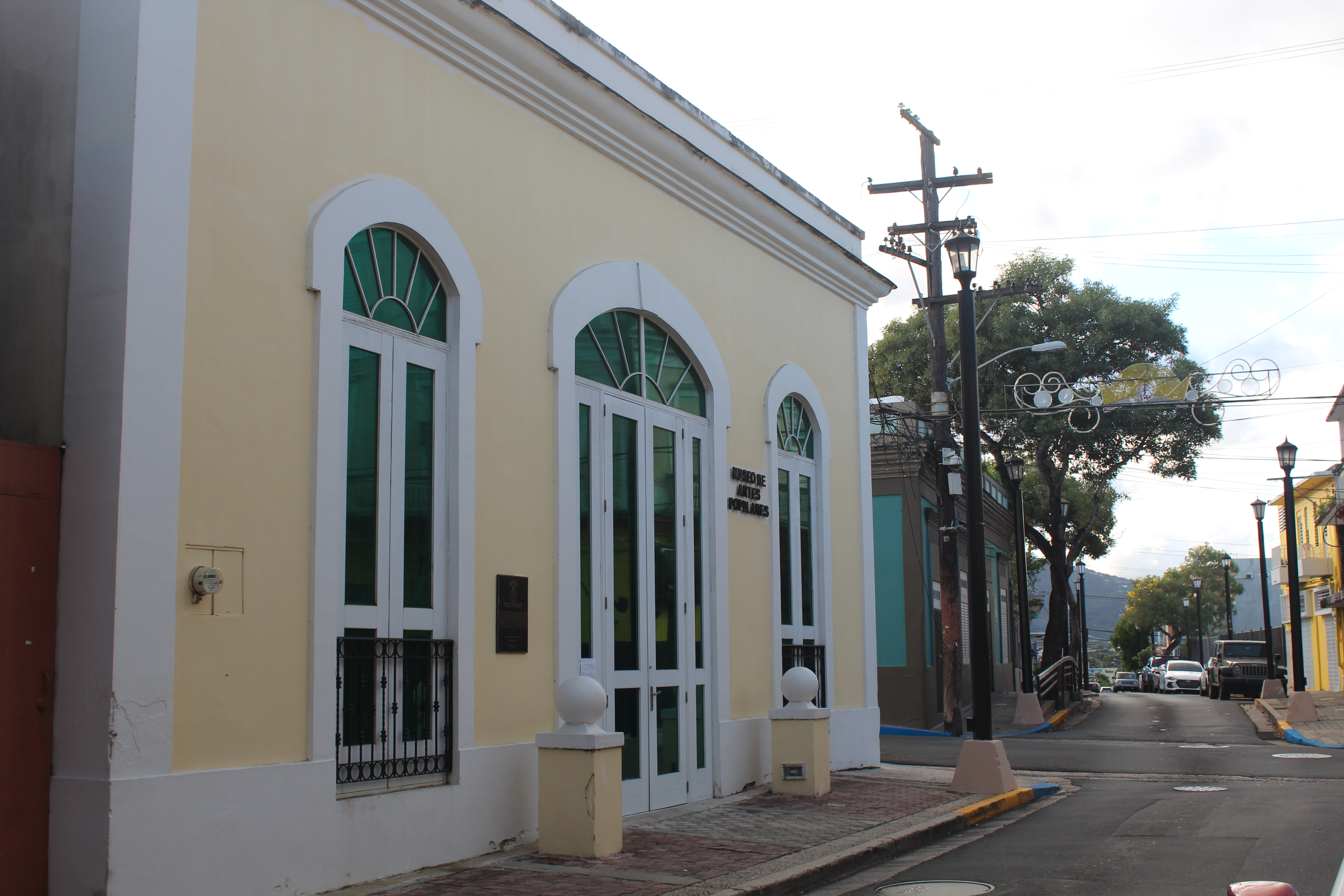
Calle Betances (PR-156) in Caguas barrio-pueblo

== Route description ==
It is the main artery to Aguas Buenas from Caguas since the highway from Puerto Rico Highway 52 to the main downtown has at least two lanes and a shoulder per direction. From Aguas Buenas to Orocovis it is a rural, yet safe road which enters all the business districts and plazas of Aguas Buenas, Comerío, Barranquitas and Orocovis. It is one of two long east–west highways through the center of the island (the other being Puerto Rico Highway 111) but it never approaches a coast. Puerto Rico Highway 111 approaches Aguadilla's shore near PR-2 but PR-156, ending in Caguas, is nearly 35 kilometers away from the east coast.

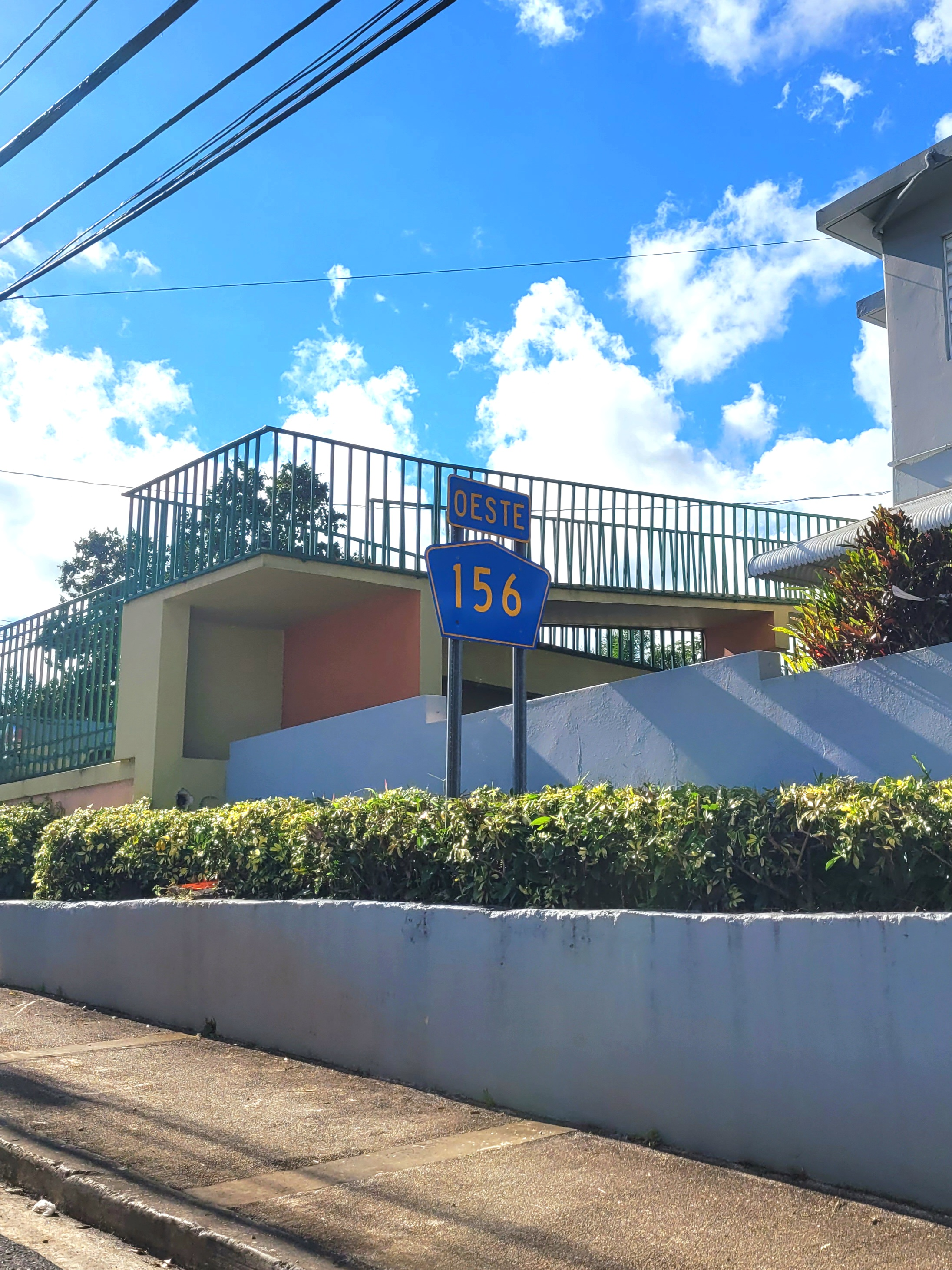
PR-156 west in Barranquitas barrio-pueblo

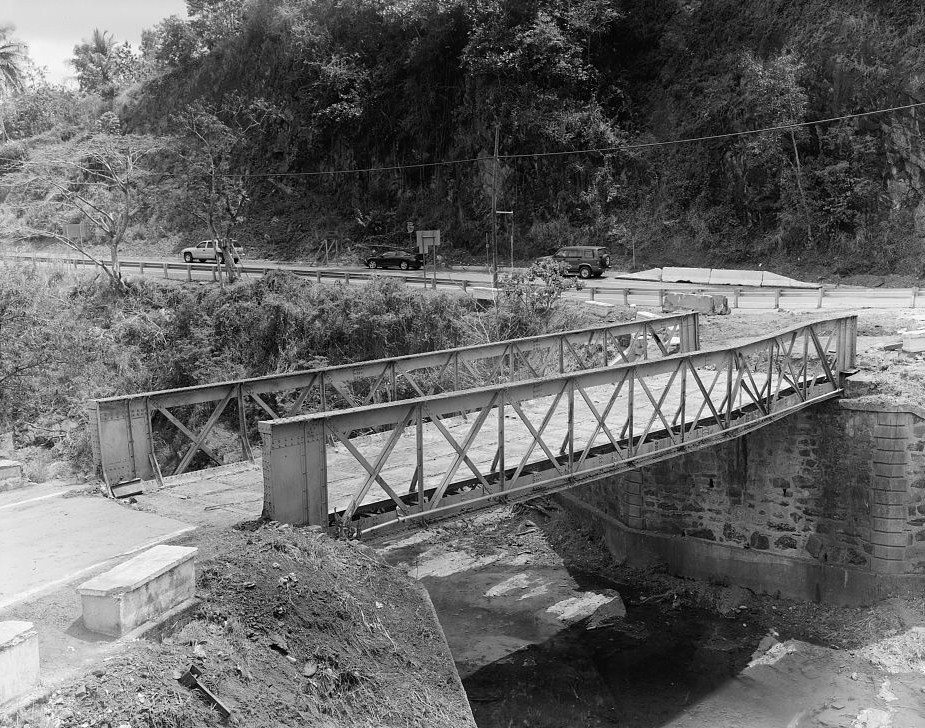
Río Hondo Bridge in Comerío

== Major intersections ==
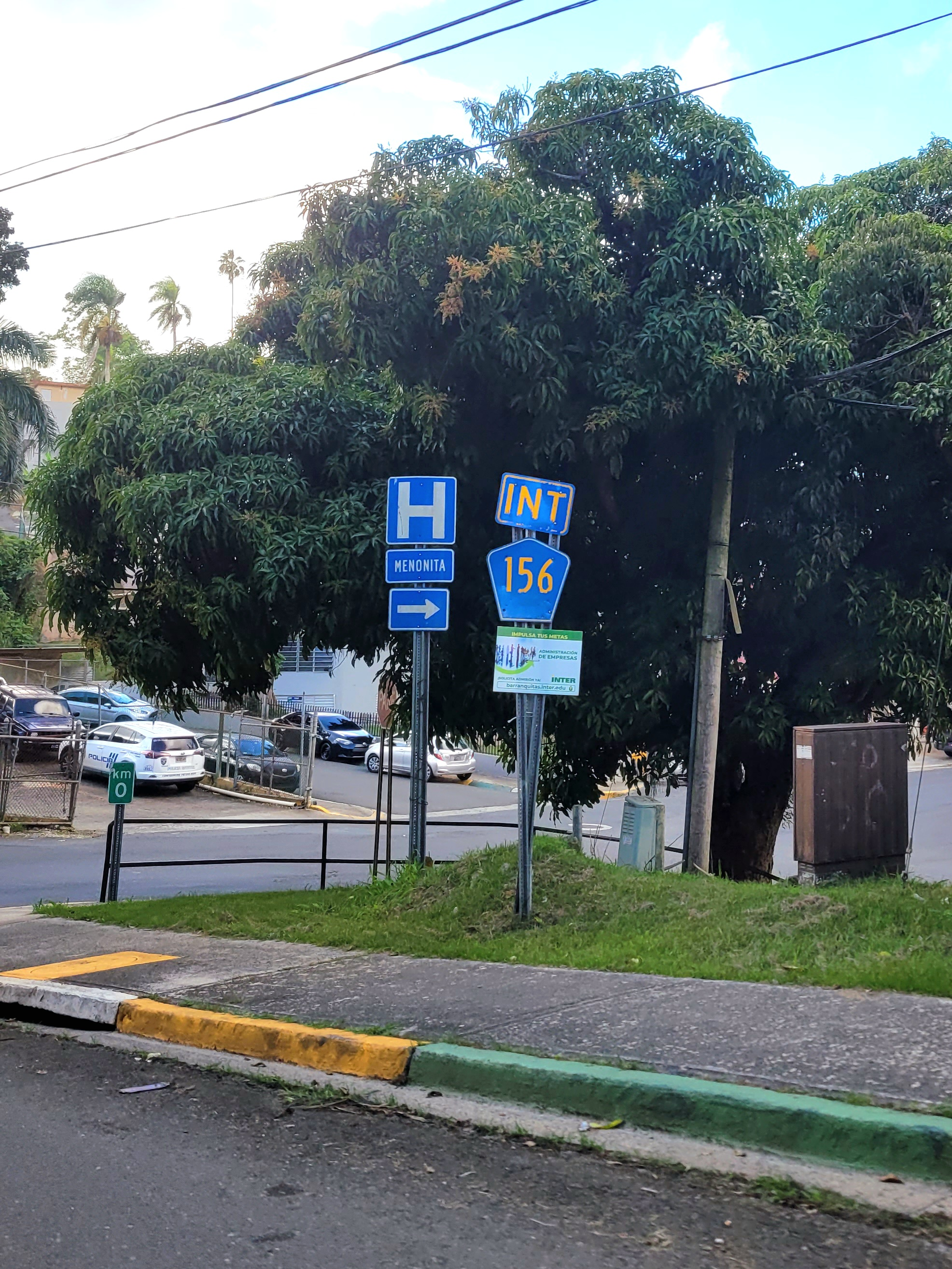
PR-719 north approaching PR-156 junction in downtown Barranquitas

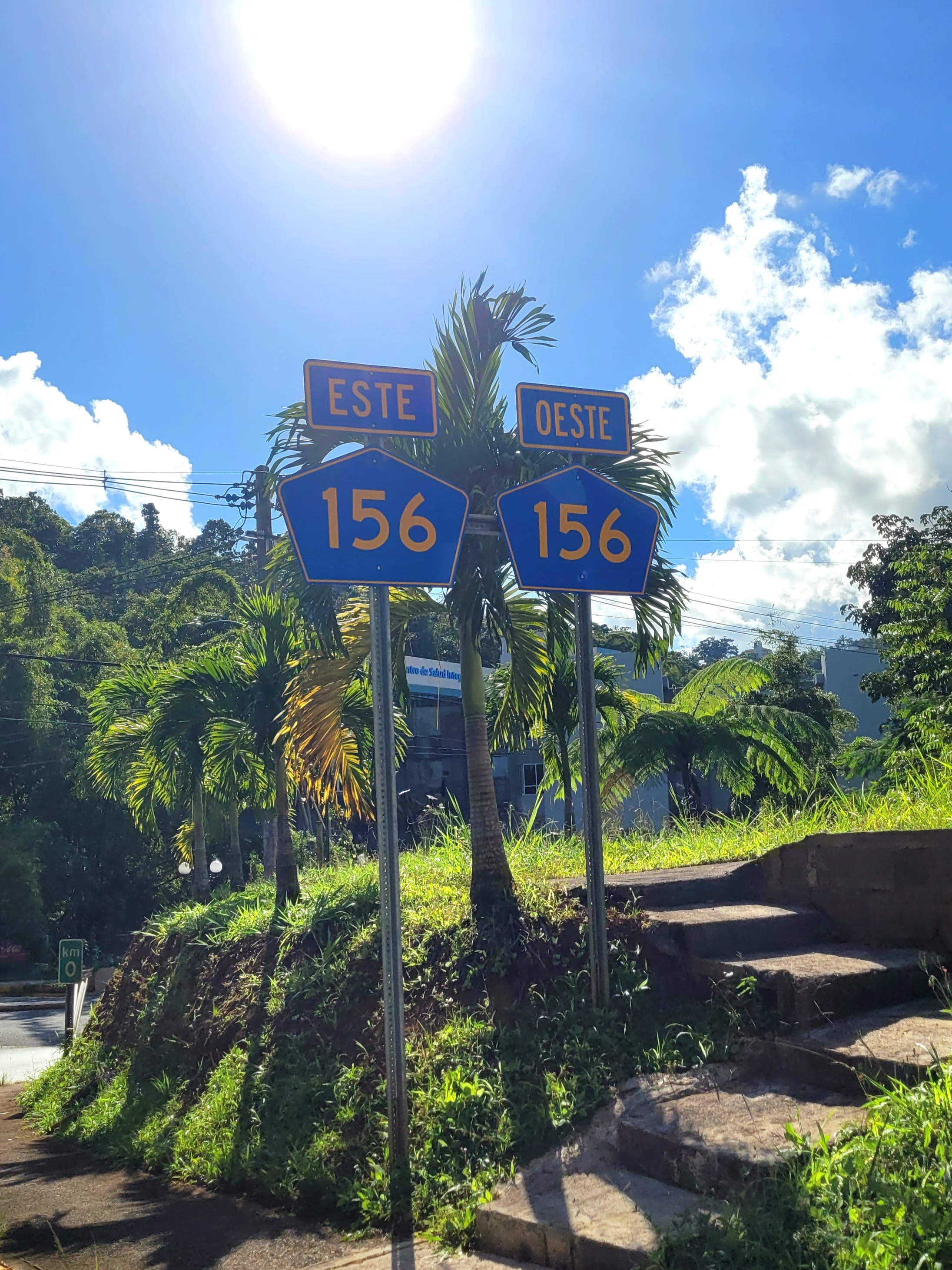
Signs for PR-156 at the southern terminus of PR-152 in Barranquitas

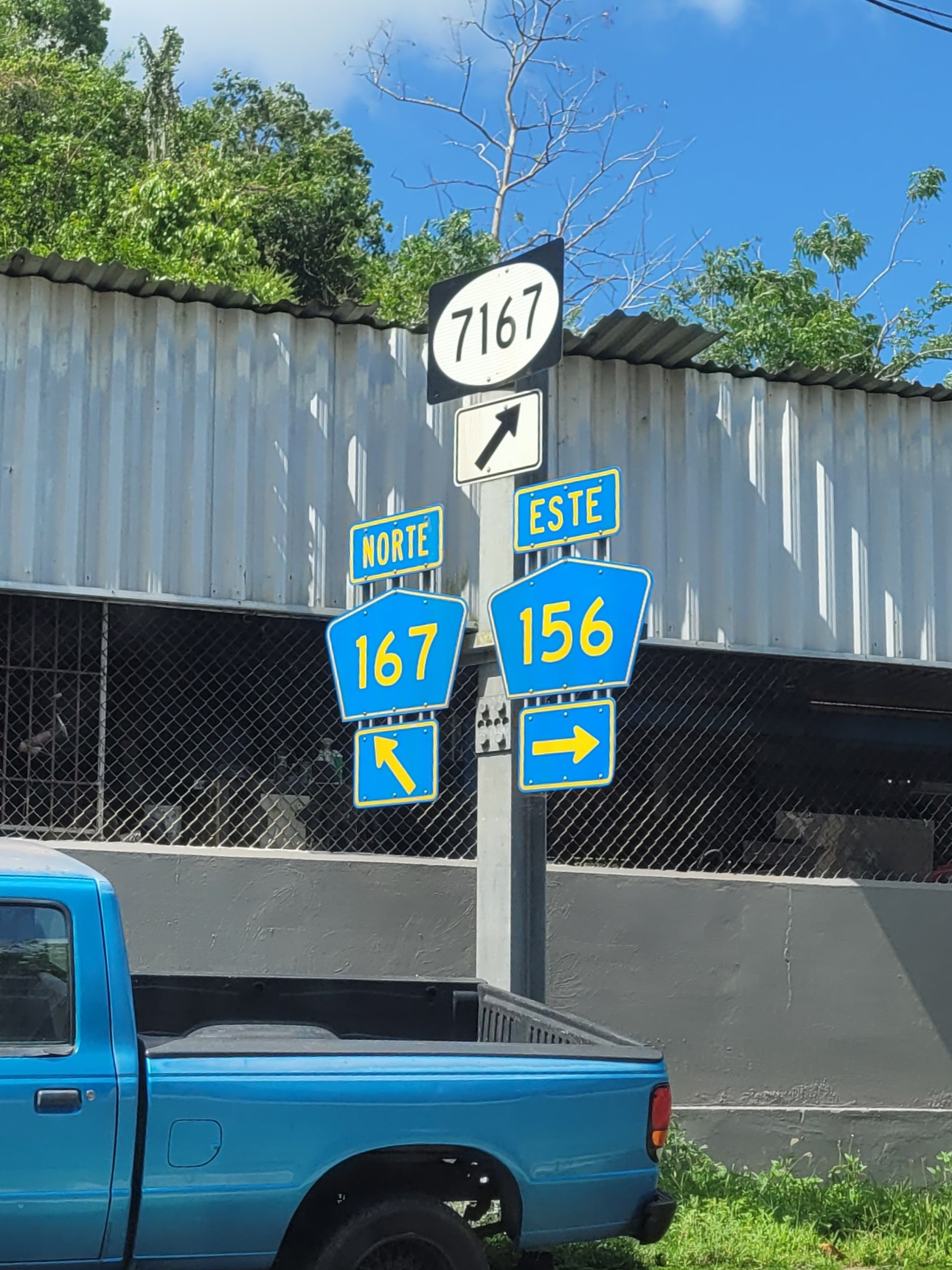
PR-156 east at PR-167 and PR-7167 intersection in Doña Elena, Comerío

| Municipality | Location | km | mi | Destinations | Notes |
|---|---|---|---|---|---|
| Orocovis | Orocovis barrio-pueblo–Orocovis line | 0.0 | 0.0 | PR-597 (Calle Ernesto Ramos Antonini) / PR-5155 (Calle 4 de Julio) – Morovis, Coamo | Western terminus of PR-156 |
| Orocovis | Orocovis barrio-pueblo–Orocovis line | 0.4 | 0.25 | PR-5156 (Avenida Jesús M. "Tito" Colón Collazo) – Morovis, Coamo | |
| Orocovis | Botijas | 3.1 | 1.9 | PR-569 – Sabana | |
| Orocovis | Botijas | 6.4– 6.5 | 4.0– 4.0 | PR-7772 – Botijas | |
| Barranquitas | Palo Hincado | 10.5 | 6.5 | PR-720 – Palo Hincado | |
| Barranquitas | Palo Hincado | 11.6 | 7.2 | PR-770 – Cañabón | |
| Barranquitas | Barranquitas barrio-pueblo | 14.2– 14.3 | 8.8– 8.9 | PR-152R (Avenida Ingeniero José Zayas Green) – Naranjito, Coamo | |
| Barranquitas | Barranquitas barrio-pueblo | 15.4– 15.5 | 9.6– 9.6 | PR-162 (Calle Manuel Torres) – Aibonito | One-way street; southbound access via Calle Susano Maldonado |
| Barranquitas | Barranquitas barrio-pueblo | 15.9 | 9.9 | PR-719 south (Vía Los Torcheros) – Aibonito | |
| Barranquitas | Barranquitas barrio-pueblo–Quebradillas line | 16.4 | 10.2 | PR-152 north – Naranjito | |
| Barranquitas | Quebrada Grande–Honduras line | 20.4 | 12.7 | PR-7174 – Honduras | |
| Barranquitas | Quebrada Grande–Honduras line | 22.4 | 13.9 | PR-749 – Quebrada Grande | |
| Comerío | Río Hondo | 26.4 | 16.4 | PR-774 – Honduras, Río Hondo 2 | |
| Comerío | Río Hondo | 28.6– 28.7 | 17.8– 17.8 | PR-776 – Río Hondo | |
| Comerío | Río Hondo | 28.7 | 17.8 | Puente del Río Hondo over the Río Hondo | |
| Comerío | Comerío barrio-pueblo | 31.7– 31.8 | 19.7– 19.8 | PR-740 south – Cidra | |
| Comerío | Comerío barrio-pueblo | 32.2 | 20.0 | PR-7778 east – Piñas | |
| Comerío | Palomas–Comerío barrio-pueblo line | 32.5 | 20.2 | PR-779 west – Palomas | |
| Comerío | Quebrada Higüero | 34.5 | 21.4 | Puente del Higüero | |
| Comerío | Doña Elena | 35.1 | 21.8 | PR-167 north / PR-7167 – Naranjito, Bayamón | |
| Comerío | Naranjo | 35.2– 35.3 | 21.9– 21.9 | PR-778 south (Desvío Ángel Luis Morales Báez, "Wiso") – Comerío | |
| Comerío | Naranjo | 35.5– 35.6 | 22.1– 22.1 | PR-781 – Cedrito | |
| Comerío | Naranjo | 36.5 | 22.7 | PR-172 – Cidra | |
| Comerío–Aguas Buenas municipal line | Naranjo–Bayamoncito line | 39.9 | 24.8 | PR-782 / PR-7090 – Cejas, Juan Asencio | |
| Aguas Buenas | Bayamoncito | 41.3 | 25.7 | PR-790 – Juan Asencio | |
| Aguas Buenas | Mula–Sumidero line | 47.6 | 29.6 | PR-173 south – Cidra | Western terminus of PR-173 concurrency |
| Aguas Buenas | Aguas Buenas barrio-pueblo | 50.0 | 31.1 | PR-174 – Bayamón | |
| Aguas Buenas | Aguas Buenas barrio-pueblo | 50.3 | 31.3 | PR-173 north (Calle Padre Sercus) – Guaynabo | Eastern terminus of PR-173 concurrency; one-way street |
| Aguas Buenas | Bairoa–Sumidero– Cagüitas tripoint | 50.6– 50.7 | 31.4– 31.5 | PR-794 (Avenida Doctor Gilberto Concepción de Gracia) – Cagüitas | Seagull intersection |
| Aguas Buenas | Bairoa | 52.3 | 32.5 | PR-7156 – Cagüitas | |
| Caguas | Cañabón | 53.6 | 33.3 | PR-7156 to PR-777 – Pozo Dulce | |
| Caguas | Cañabón | 55.4– 55.5 | 34.4– 34.5 | PR-196 east (Avenida José Garrido) – San Juan | |
| Caguas | Cañabón | 57.1 | 35.5 | PR-34 (Avenida Turabo) – Caguas | |
| Caguas | Caguas barrio-pueblo | 57.8– 57.9 | 35.9– 36.0 | PR-52 (Autopista Luis A. Ferré) – San Juan, Ponce | PR-52 exit 19; partial cloverleaf interchange |
| Caguas | Caguas barrio-pueblo | 58.4 | 36.3 | PR-33 (Avenida José Mercado) – San Juan, Cayey | |
| Caguas | Caguas barrio-pueblo | 58.6 | 36.4 | PR-1 south (Calle Luis Muñoz Rivera) – Cayey | One-way street |
| Caguas | Caguas barrio-pueblo | 58.7 | 36.5 | PR-1P north (Calle Manuel Corchado y Juarbe) – San Juan | Eastern terminus of PR-156; one-way street |
1.000 mi = 1.609 km; 1.000 km = 0.621 mi: Concurrency terminus; Incomplete access

== Related routes ==
Currently, Puerto Rico Highway 156 has two branches along its route. One of them is located in Orocovis and the other is between Aguas Buenas and Caguas.

=== Puerto Rico Highway 5156 ===
Highway 5156
- Location: Orocovis
- Length: 0.25 km (0.16 mi; 820 ft)

Puerto Rico Highway 5156 (PR-5156) is an east–west avenue located in downtown Orocovis. This highways extends from PR-156 to PR-155, crossing the Orocovis River. The entire route is located in Orocovis.

| Location | km | mi | Destinations | Notes |
|---|---|---|---|---|
| Orocovis barrio-pueblo | 0.25 | 0.16 | PR-155 – Morovis, Coamo | Western terminus of PR-5156 |
| Orocovis barrio-pueblo | 0.15 | 0.093 | PR-599 (Calle Juan Rivera de Santiago) – Orocovis | |
| Orocovis barrio-pueblo–Orocovis line | 0.00 | 0.00 | PR-156 – Orocovis, Barranquitas | Eastern terminus of PR-5156 |
1.000 mi = 1.609 km; 1.000 km = 0.621 mi

=== Puerto Rico Highway 7156 ===
Highway 7156
- Location: Aguas Buenas – Caguas
- Length: 2.7 km (1.7 mi)

Puerto Rico Highway 7156 (PR-7156) is a rural, east–west road between the municipalities of Aguas Buenas and Caguas. This route is an old portion of PR-156 that connects the new alignment with PR-777 between Bairoa and Cagüitas barrios of Aguas Buenas. It extends from PR-156 west in Bairoa, Aguas Buenas, to PR-156 east in Cañabón, Caguas.

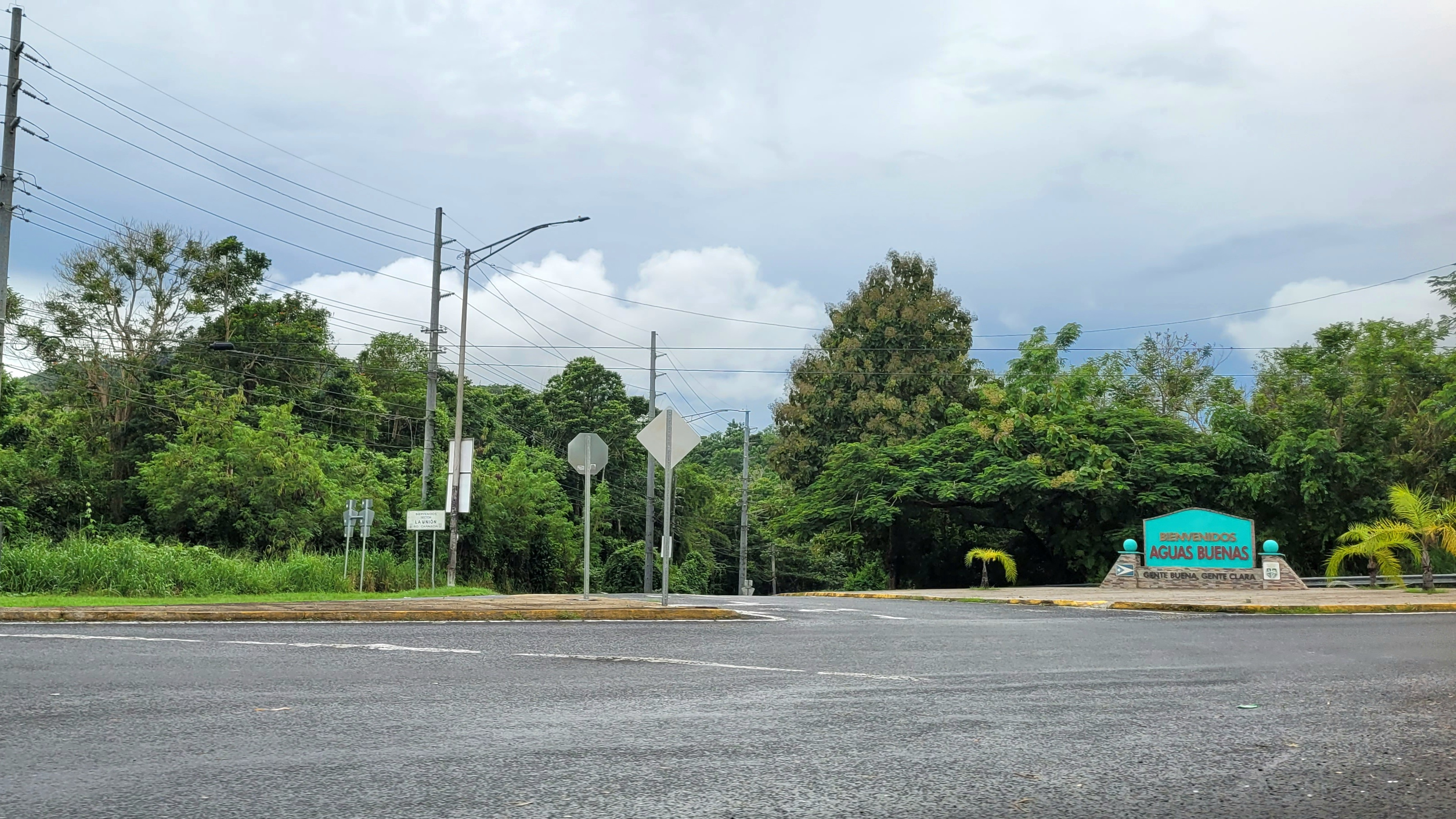
Eastern terminus of PR-7156 between Caguas and Aguas Buenas

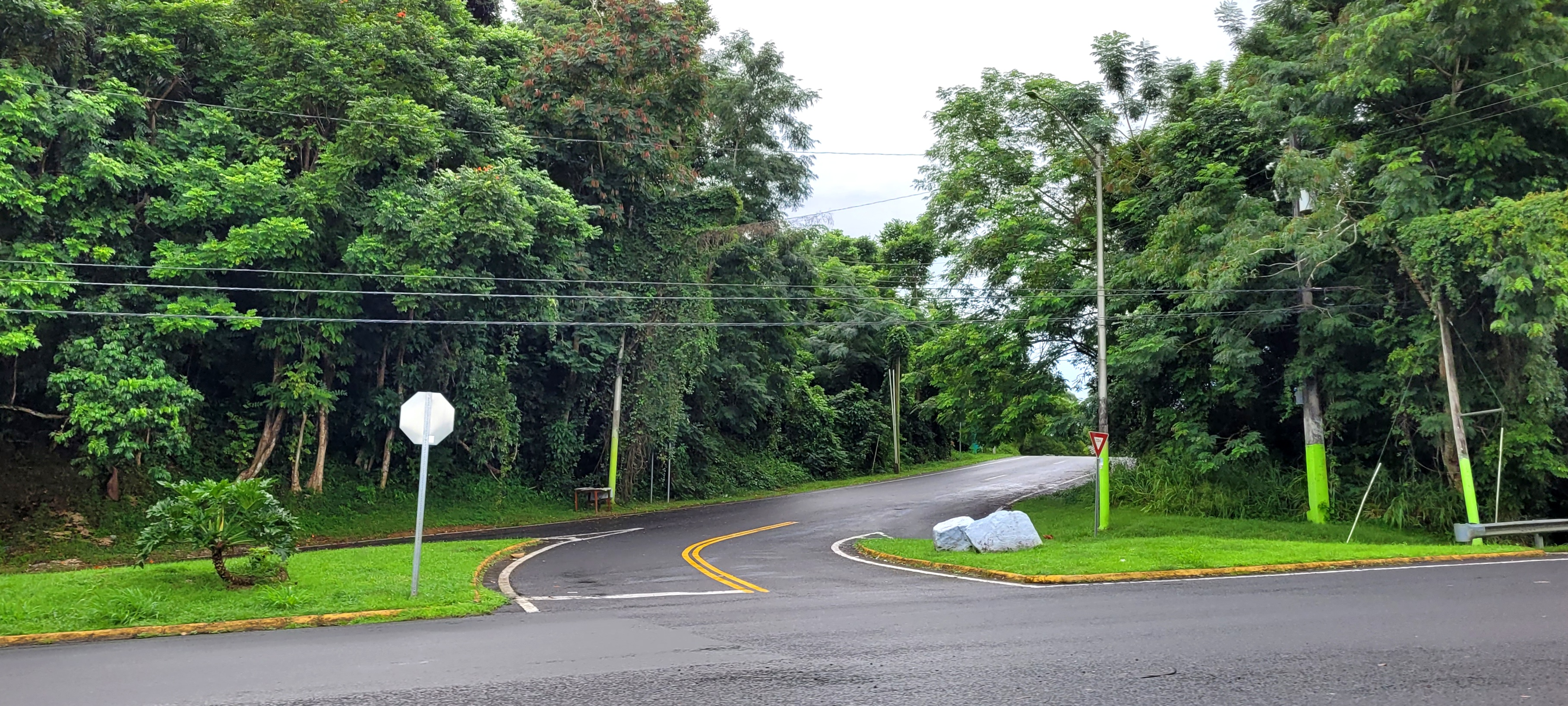
Western terminus of PR-7156 in Bairoa, Aguas Buenas

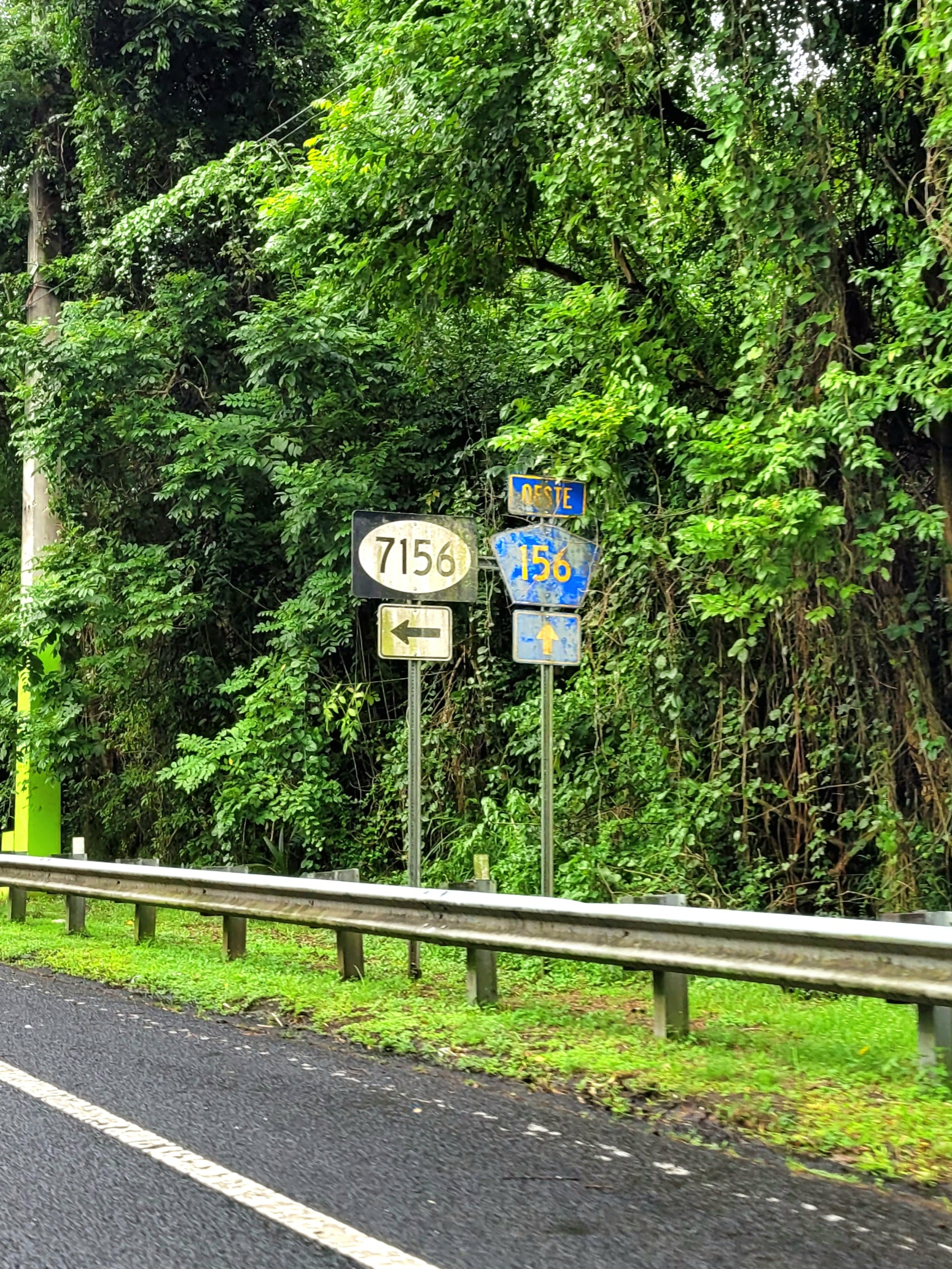
PR-156 west at PR-7156 intersection in Bairoa, Aguas Buenas

| Municipality | Location | km | mi | Destinations | Notes |
|---|---|---|---|---|---|
| Aguas Buenas | Bairoa | 0.0 | 0.0 | PR-156 – Aguas Buenas, Caguas | Western terminus of PR-7156 |
| Aguas Buenas | Bairoa–Cagüitas line | 1.6 | 0.99 | PR-777 – Cagüitas | |
| Caguas | Cañabón | 2.7 | 1.7 | PR-156 (Avenida Joviniano Ríos Mercado) – Caguas, Aguas Buenas | Eastern terminus of PR-7156 |
1.000 mi = 1.609 km; 1.000 km = 0.621 mi

== See also ==
- 1953 Puerto Rico highway renumbering
