= Río Hondo Bridge =

Historic bridge in Comerío, Puerto Rico

- U.S. National Register of Historic Places
- Puerto Rico Historic Sites and Zones
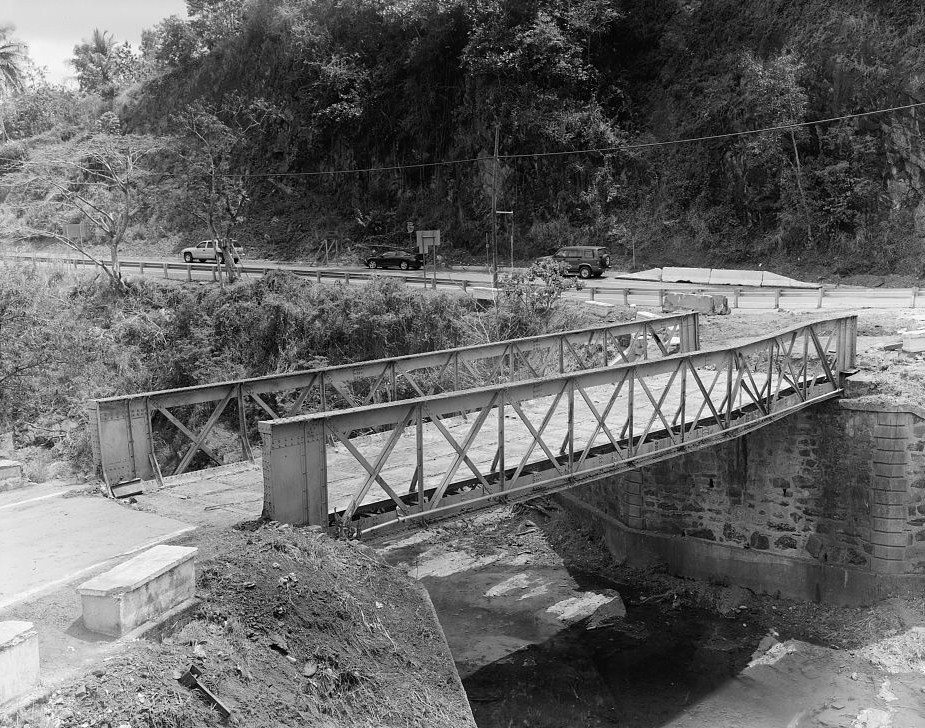
- The bridge in the later part of the 20th century

- Location within Puerto Rico
- Location: Highway 156, km 26.9; Barrio Río Hondo; Comerío, Puerto Rico
- Coordinates: 18°12′31″N 66°14′35″W
- Area: 92.7 m^{2} (998 sq ft)
- Built: 1881 (original construction); 1908 (installed at final site)
- Engineer: Rafael Nones
- Architectural style: Double Warren pony truss
- MPS: Historic Bridges of Puerto Rico MPS
- NRHP reference No.: 95000842
- RNSZH No.: 2000-(RC)-22-JP-SH

Significant dates
- Added to NRHP: July 19, 1995
- Designated RNSZH: March 15, 2000

The Hondo River Bridge (Spanish: Puente del Río Hondo) was a historic bridge over the Hondo River in Comerío municipality, Puerto Rico. As of 1995, it was the oldest bridge truss in Puerto Rico, employing a double Warren pony truss design and unique open web transverse joists. It was originally installed in 1881 as one of three spans of the Reyes Católicos Bridge over the Plata River on the San Juan–Mayagüez road, using metal parts fabricated in Belgium. After a hurricane destroyed one of the other spans of the Reyes Católicos Bridge in 1899, this surviving span was moved and re-installed on new abutments under the supervision of engineer Rafael Nones in 1908, as part of the Comerío–Barranquitas road. It was finally removed and replaced in 2001.

The bridge was added to the U.S. National Register of Historic Places in 1995 and to the Puerto Rico Register of Historic Sites and Zones in 2000.

== See also ==
- List of bridges documented by the Historic American Engineering Record in Puerto Rico
- National Register of Historic Places listings in Comerío, Puerto Rico
