= Puerto Rico Highway 873 =

Highway in Puerto Rico

Highway 873
- Ruta 873

Route information
- Maintained by Puerto Rico DTPW
- Length: 1.7 km (1.1 mi)

Major junctions
- South end: PR-1 in Tortugo
- North end: PR-1 in Caimito

Location
- Country: United States
- Territory: Puerto Rico
- Municipalities: San Juan, Guaynabo

Highway system
- Roads in Puerto Rico; List
← PR-870	→ PR-888

Puerto Rico Highway 873 (PR-873) is a north–south road located between the municipalities of San Juan and Guaynabo, Puerto Rico, and it corresponds to an original segment of the historic Carretera Central. The General Norzagaray Bridge is located on this route.

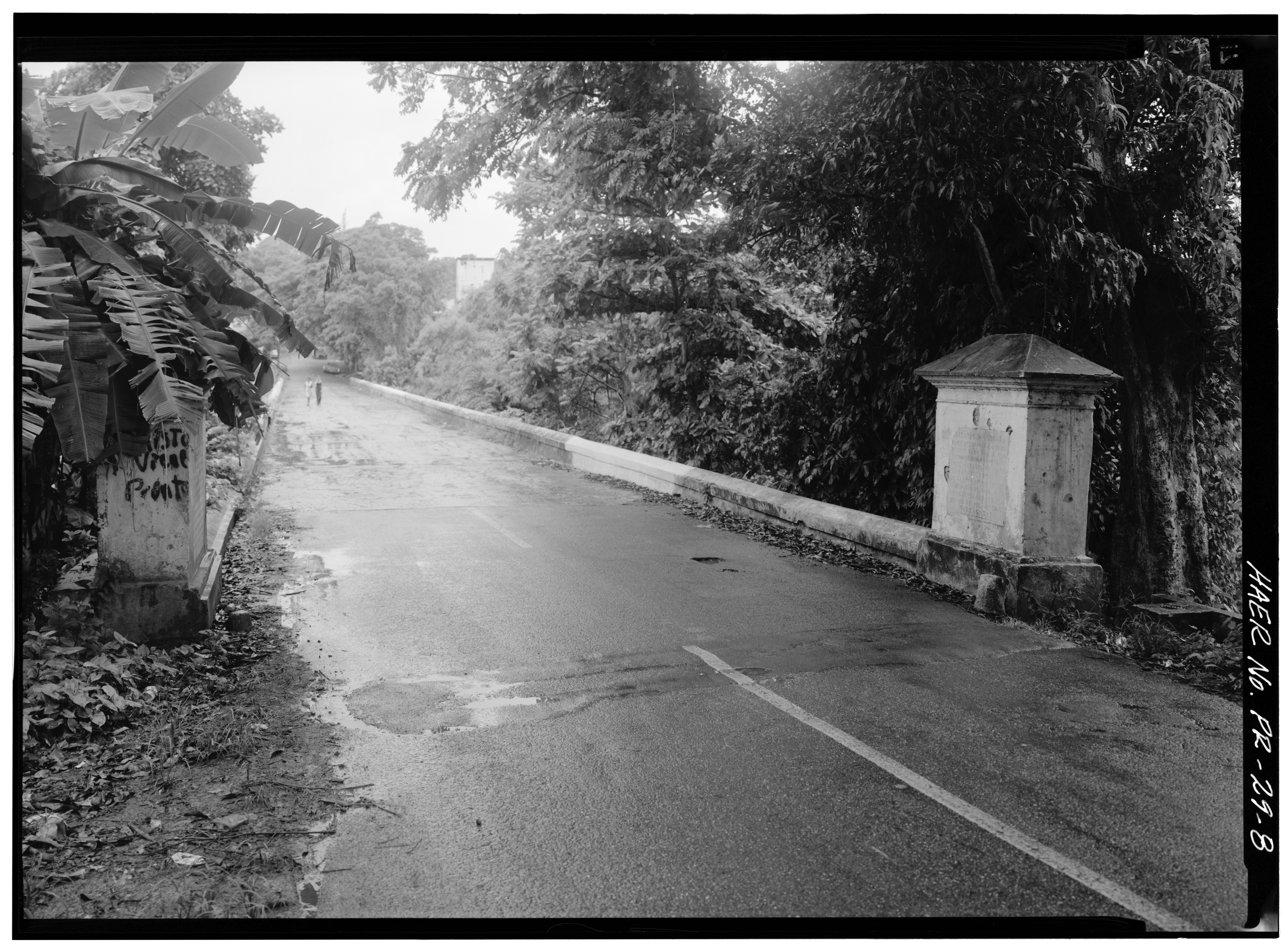
General Norzagaray Bridge looking south

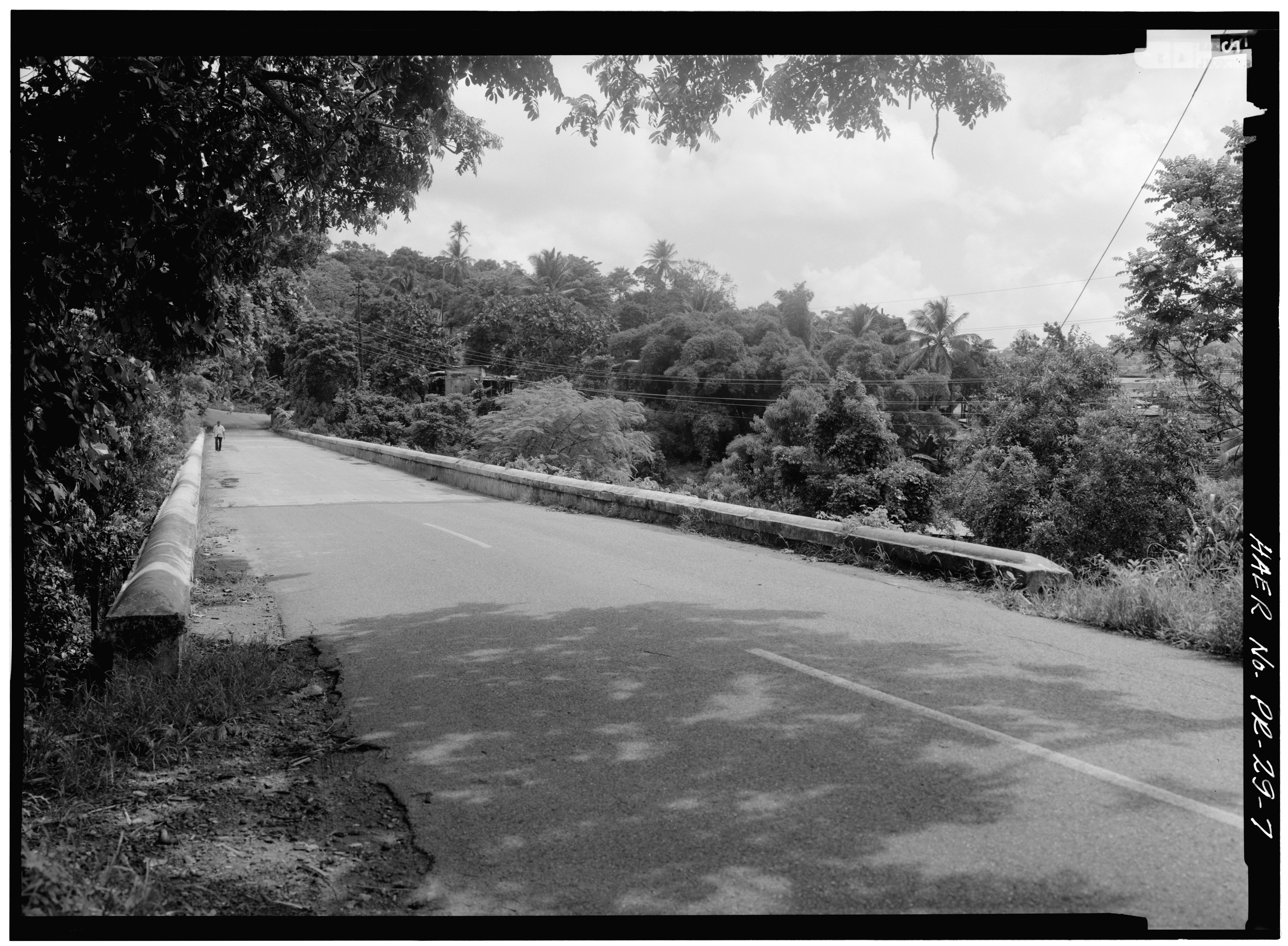
General Norzagaray Bridge looking north

== Major intersections ==
Municipality	Location	km	mi	Destinations	Notes
San Juan	Tortugo	1.7	1.1	PR-1	Southern terminus of PR-873; the Carretera Central continues toward Guaynabo; access to San Juan and Caguas; unsigned
San Juan	Quebrada Frailes	0.8– 0.7	0.50– 0.43	Puente General Norzagaray	
Guaynabo	No major junctions				
San Juan	Caimito	0.0	0.0	PR-1 south / PR-199 east / PR-Calle Turquesa (unsigned)	Northern terminus of PR-873; the Carretera Central continues toward San Juan; no access to PR-199 west; PR-1 north access is via PR-199 east; access to San Juan, Caguas and Trujillo Alto
1.000 mi = 1.609 km; 1.000 km = 0.621 mi: Incomplete access
