= Hondo River (Comerío, Puerto Rico) =

River of Puerto Rico

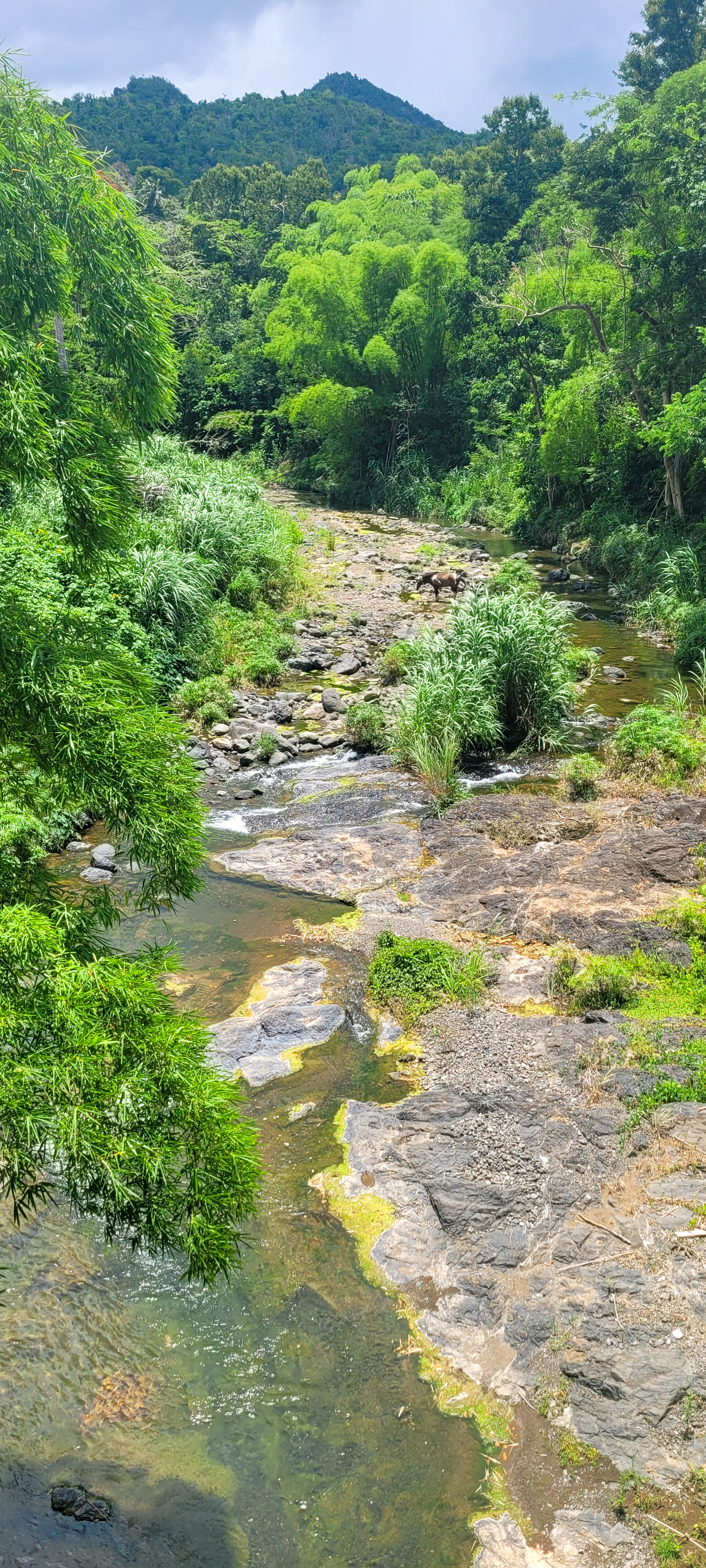
- View of Hondo River from Puerto Rico Highway 156

Location
- Commonwealth: Puerto Rico
- Municipality: Comerío

Physical characteristics
- Source
  - coordinates: 18.2035680°N 66.2396124°W

The Hondo River is a river of Comerío municipality, Puerto Rico.

== See also ==
- Río Hondo Bridge: NRHP listing in Comerío, Puerto Rico
- List of rivers of Puerto Rico
