= Cagüitas, Aguas Buenas, Puerto Rico =

Barrio of Puerto Rico

Cagüitas
- Barrio
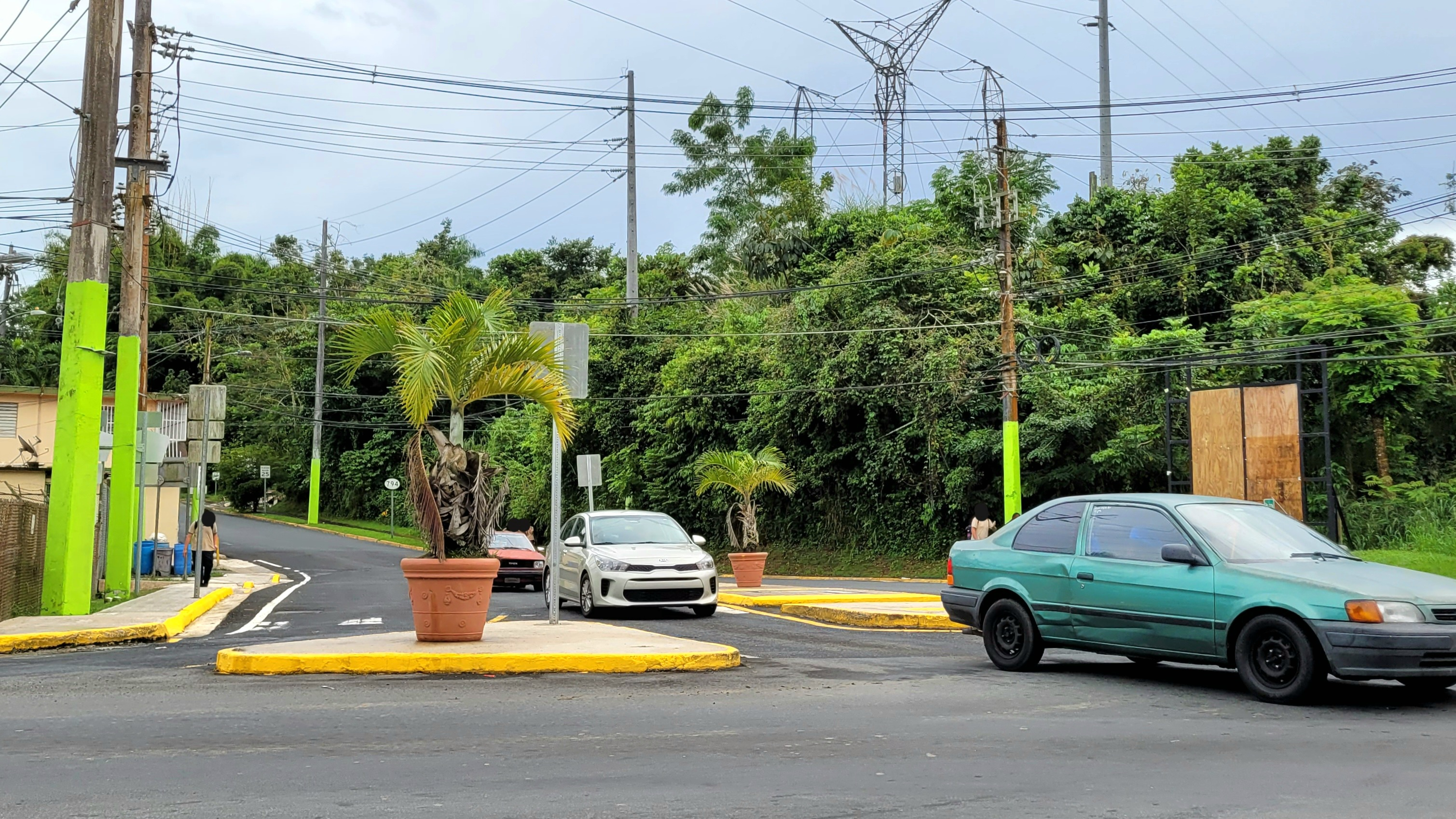
- Puerto Rico Highway 794 between Cagüitas and Sumidero

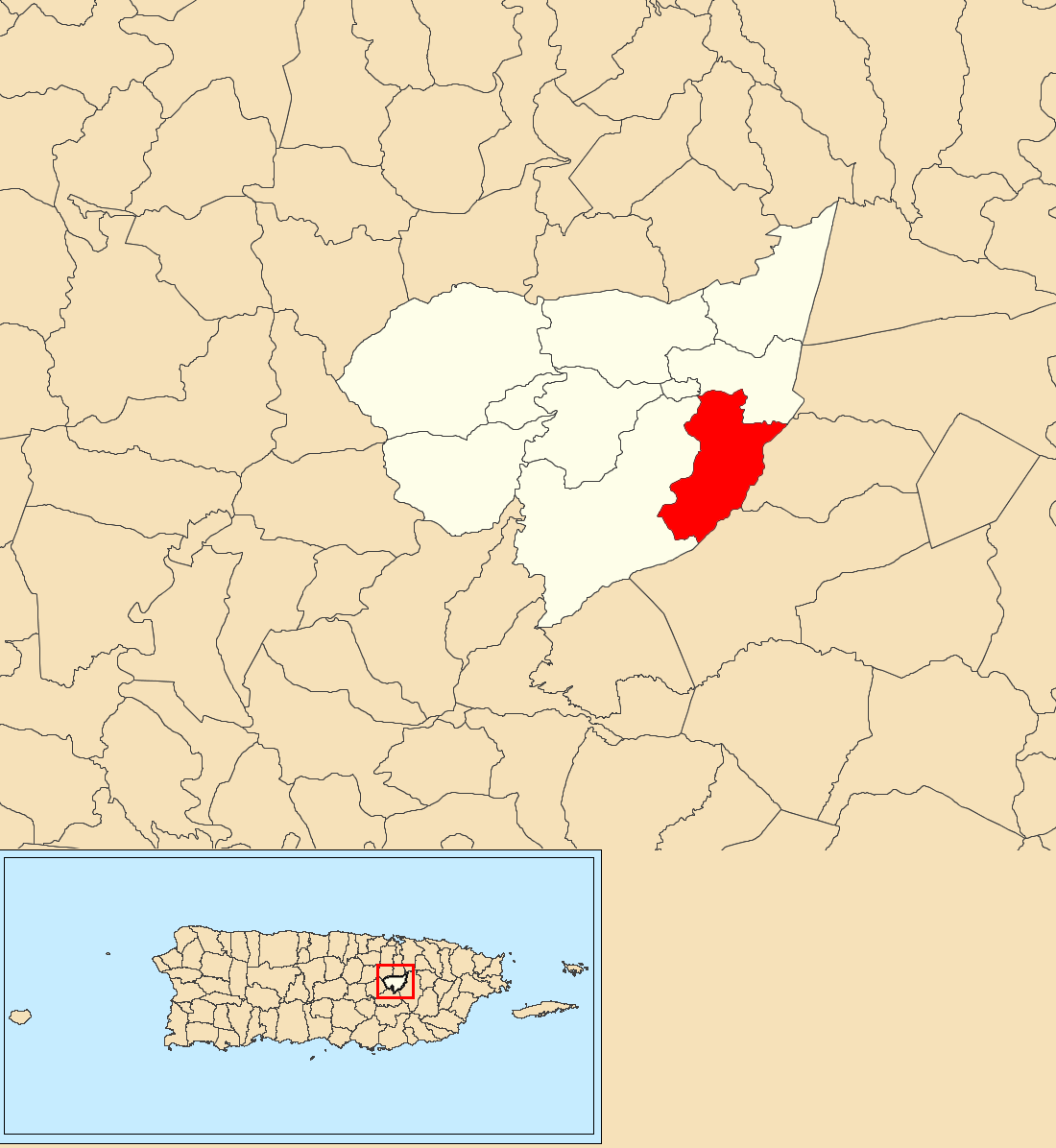
- Location of Cagüitas within the municipality of Aguas Buenas shown in red

- Location of Puerto Rico
- Coordinates: 18°14′16″N 66°05′46″W
- Commonwealth: Puerto Rico
- Municipality: Aguas Buenas

Area
  - Total: 2.61 sq mi (6.8 km^{2})
  - Land: 2.61 sq mi (6.8 km^{2})
  - Water: 0.00 sq mi (0 km^{2})
- Elevation: 571 ft (174 m)

Population (2020)
  - Total: 2,230
  - Density: 854/sq mi (330/km^{2})
- Source: 2020 Census
- Time zone: UTC−4 (AST)
- ZIP Code: 00703
- Area code: 787/939

Cagüitas is a barrio in the municipality of Aguas Buenas, Puerto Rico. Its population in 2020 was 2,230.

== History ==
Cagüitas was in Spain's gazetteers until Puerto Rico was ceded by Spain in the aftermath of the Spanish–American War under the terms of the Treaty of Paris of 1898 and became an unincorporated territory of the United States. In 1899, the United States Department of War conducted a census of Puerto Rico, finding that the population of Cagüitas barrio was 856.

Historical population
Census	Pop.	Note	%±
1900	856		—
1910	950		11.0%
1920	1,006		5.9%
1930	1,218		21.1%
1940	1,406		15.4%
1950	1,591		13.2%
1960	1,878		18.0%
1970	1,869		−0.5%
1980	2,181		16.7%
1990	2,295		5.2%
2000	2,704		17.8%
2010	2,664		−1.5%
2020	2,230		−16.3%
U.S. Decennial Census; 1899 (shown as 1900) 1910-1930; 1930-1950 1980-2000 2010 2020

== Special Communities ==
In 2001, law 1-2001 was passed to identify marginalized communities of Puerto Rico. In 2017, Governor Rosello created a new government agency to work with the Special Communities of Puerto Rico Program. Cagüitas Centro, an area of Cagüitas barrio, was one of the 742 places on the list of Comunidades Especiales de Puerto Rico.

== See also ==
- List of communities in Puerto Rico
