= Tomás de Castro, Caguas, Puerto Rico =

Barrio of Puerto Rico

Tomás de Castro
- Barrio
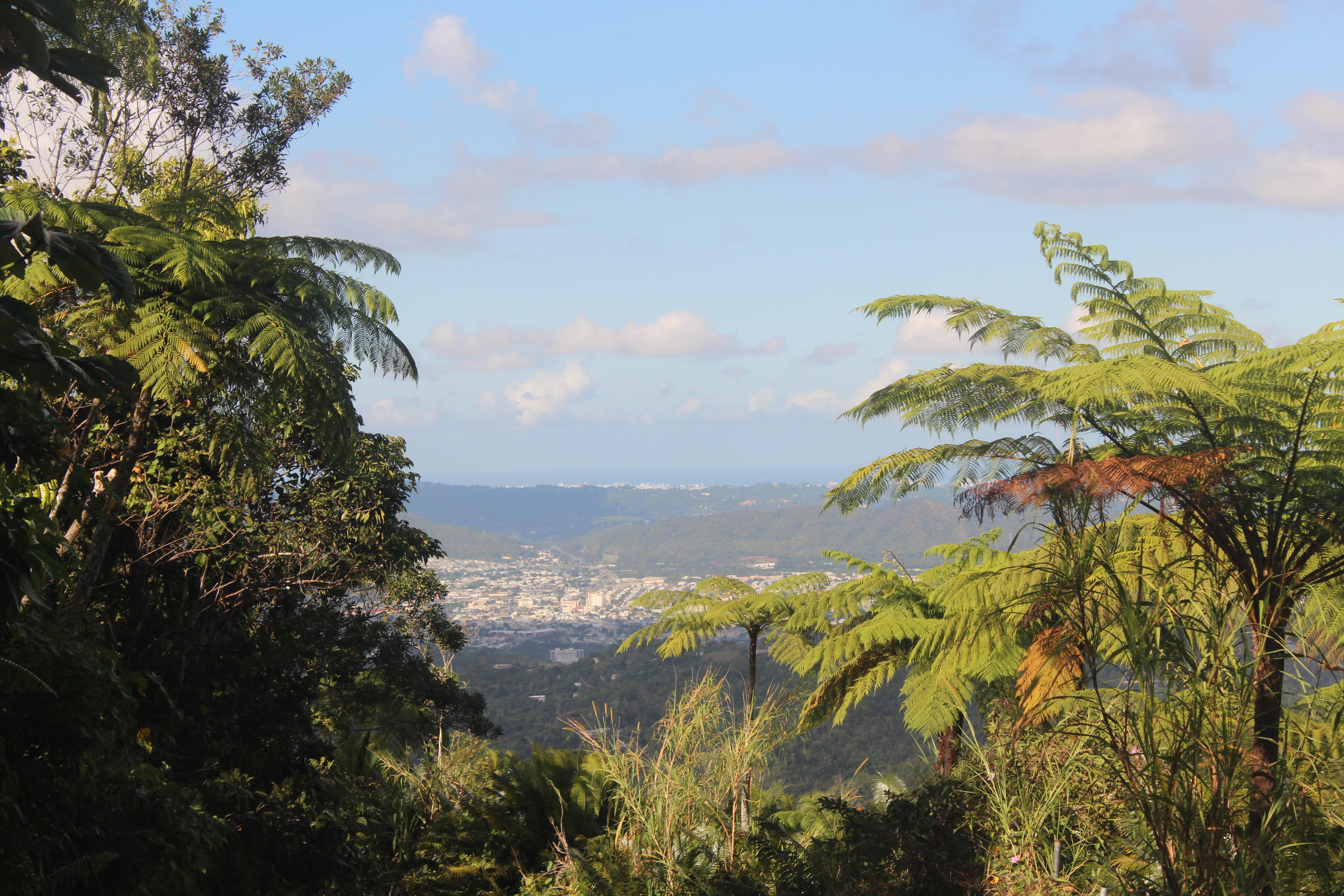
- View of the valley from Tomás de Castro

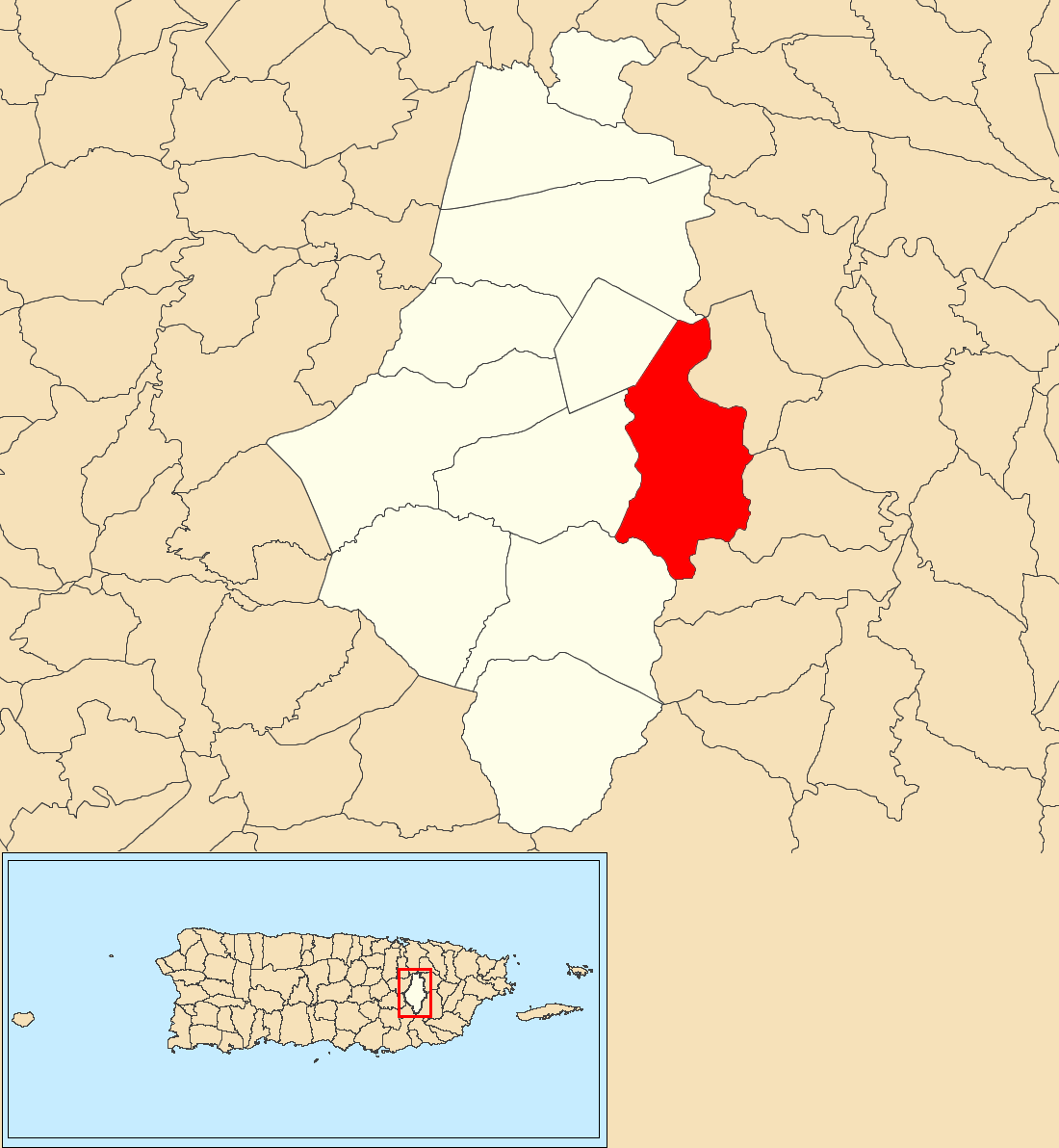
- Location of Tomás de Castro within the municipality of Caguas shown in red

- Location of Puerto Rico
- Coordinates: 18°11′58″N 66°00′48″W
- Commonwealth: Puerto Rico
- Municipality: Caguas

Area
  - Total: 5.76 sq mi (14.9 km^{2})
  - Land: 5.68 sq mi (14.7 km^{2})
  - Water: 0.08 sq mi (0.21 km^{2})
- Elevation: 299 ft (91 m)

Population (2010)
  - Total: 19,414
  - Density: 3,418/sq mi (1,320/km^{2})
- Source: 2010 Census
- Time zone: UTC−4 (AST)
- ZIP code: 00725, 00726, 00727
- Area codes: 787, 939

Tomás de Castro is a barrio in the municipality of Caguas, Puerto Rico. Its population in 2010 was 19,414.

== History ==
Tomás de Castro was named after Tomás de Castro del Valenciano, a military man.

[name] was in Spain's gazetteers until Puerto Rico was ceded by Spain in the aftermath of the Spanish–American War under the terms of the Treaty of Paris of 1898 and became an unincorporated territory of the United States. In 1899, the United States Department of War conducted a census of Puerto Rico finding that the population of Tomás de Castro barrio was 1,575.

== Features and demographics ==
Tomás de Castro has 5.68 square miles (14.7 km^{2}) of land area and .08 square miles (0.21 km^{2}) of water area. In 2010, its population was 19,414 with a population density of 3,418 inhabitants per square mile (1,320/km^{2}).

Historical population
Census	Pop.	Note	%±
1900	1,575		—
1910	1,969		25.0%
1920	2,526		28.3%
1930	3,478		37.7%
1940	3,187		−8.4%
1950	3,804		19.4%
1960	4,168		9.6%
1970	0		−100.0%
1980	13,840		—
1990	18,068		30.5%
2000	19,301		6.8%
2010	19,414		0.6%
U.S. Decennial Census; 1899 (shown as 1900) 1910-1930; 1930-1950 1980-2000 2010

== See also ==
- List of communities in Puerto Rico
