= Tortugo, San Juan, Puerto Rico =

Barrio of San Juan, Puerto Rico

Tortugo
- Barrio
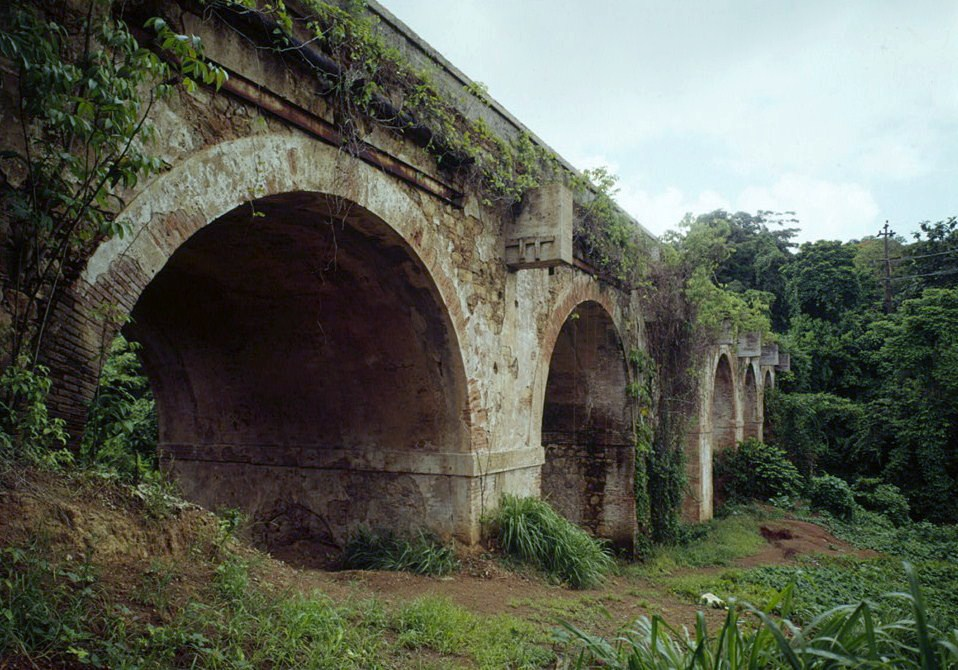
- General Norzagaray Bridge in Tortugo

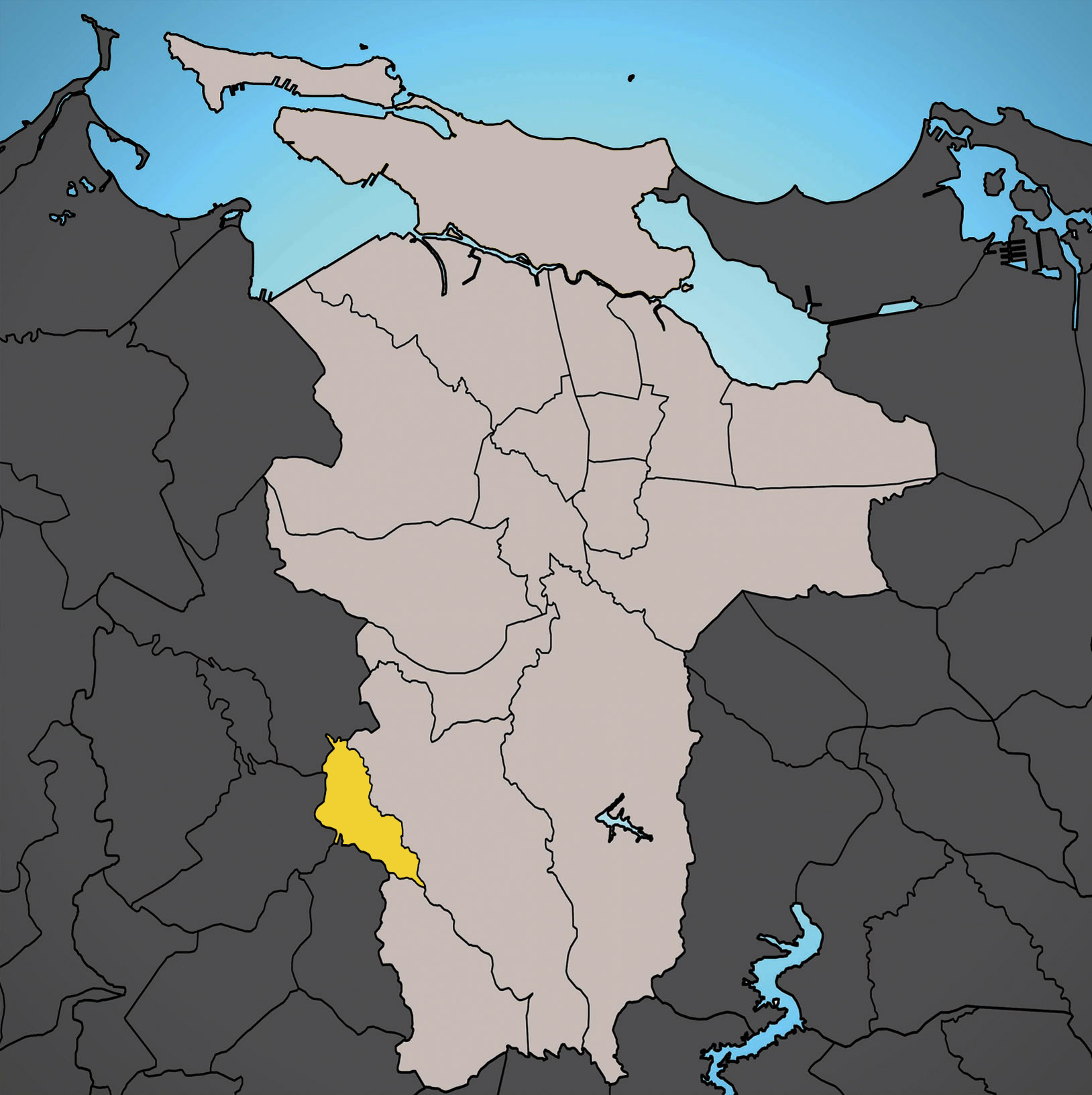
- Tortugo’s location within San Juan
- Coordinates: 18°20′34″N 66°05′29″W
- Commonwealth: Puerto Rico
- Municipality: San Juan

Area
  - Total: 0.84 sq mi (2.2 km^{2})
  - Land: 0.84 sq mi (2.2 km^{2})
  - Water: 0 sq mi (0 km^{2})
- Elevation: 259 ft (79 m)

Population (2010)
  - Total: 4,543
  - Density: 5,408.3/sq mi (2,088.2/km^{2})
- 2010 census
- Time zone: UTC−4 (AST)

Tortugo is one of the 18 barrios in the municipality of San Juan, Puerto Rico. It is the third smallest barrio of San Juan in land area and had a population of 4,543 inhabitants in 2010.

== Demographics ==
Of the 4,543 inhabitants, 67.6% were white, 19.63% were African-American, 0.42% were Amerindian, 0.15% were Asian, 8.3% were from other races and 3.9% were from a mixture of races. Of the total population, 99.32% identified as Hispanic or Latino descent.

Historical population
Census	Pop.	Note	%±
1900	460		—
1930	715		—
1940	724		1.3%
1950	1,164		60.8%
1960	2,726		134.2%
1970	2,316		−15.0%
1980	2,215		−4.4%
1990	3,877		75.0%
2000	4,351		12.2%
2010	4,543		4.4%
U.S. Decennial Census; 1899 (shown as 1900) 1910-1930; 1930-1950 1980-2000 2010

== See also ==
- List of communities in Puerto Rico
