= Cañabón, Caguas, Puerto Rico =

Barrio of Puerto Rico

Cañabón
- Barrio
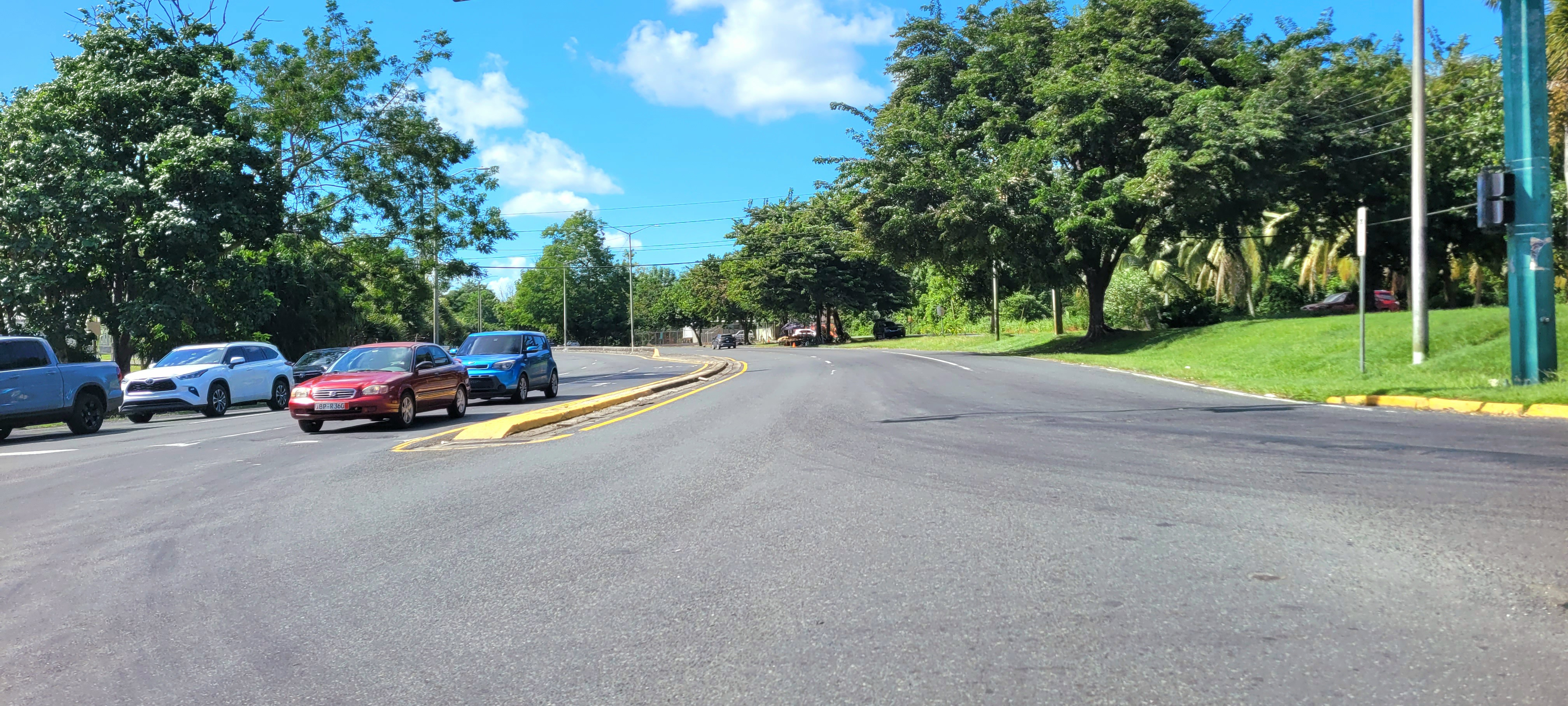
- Puerto Rico Highway 156 in Cañabón

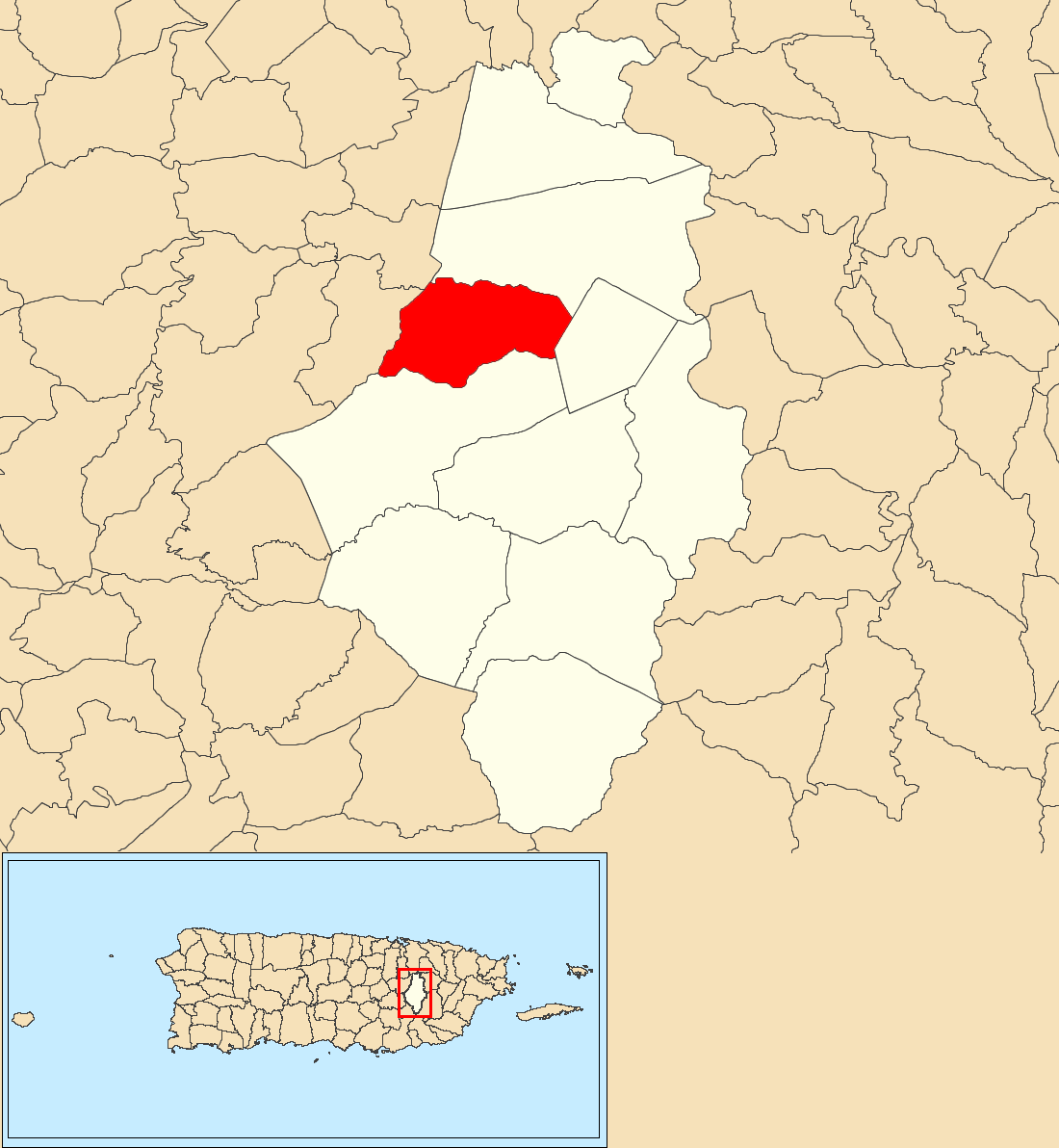
- Location of Cañabón within the municipality of Caguas shown in red

- Location of Puerto Rico
- Coordinates: 18°14′19″N 66°03′56″W
- Commonwealth: Puerto Rico
- Municipality: Caguas

Area
  - Total: 3.68 sq mi (9.5 km^{2})
  - Land: 3.67 sq mi (9.5 km^{2})
  - Water: 0.01 sq mi (0.026 km^{2})
- Elevation: 295 ft (90 m)

Population (2020)
  - Total: 11,841
  - Density: 3,230/sq mi (1,250/km^{2})
- Source: 2020 US Census
- Time zone: UTC−4 (AST)
- ZIP Code: 00725, 00726, 00727
- Area codes: 787, 939

Cañabón is a barrio in the municipality of Caguas, Puerto Rico. Its population in 2020 was 11,841.

== History ==
Cañabón was in Spain's gazetteers until Puerto Rico was ceded by Spain in the aftermath of the Spanish–American War under the terms of the Treaty of Paris of 1898 and became an unincorporated territory of the United States. In 1899, the United States Department of War conducted a census of Puerto Rico finding that the population of Cañabon barrio was 1,309.

Historical population
Census	Pop.	Note	%±
1900	1,309		—
1910	1,396		6.6%
1920	1,456		4.3%
1930	1,208		−17.0%
1940	2,443		102.2%
1950	1,014		−58.5%
1960	974		−3.9%
1970	0		−100.0%
1980	2,760		—
1990	5,901		113.8%
2000	6,070		2.9%
2010	11,310		86.3%
2020	11,841		4.7%
U.S. Decennial Census; 1899 (shown as 1900) 1910-1930; 1930-1950 1980-2000 2010 2020

== See also ==
- List of communities in Puerto Rico
