= Puerto Rico Highway 158 =

Highway in Puerto Rico

Highway 158
- Ruta 158

Route information
- Maintained by Puerto Rico DTPW

Major junctions
- South end: PR-52 in Vegas
- North end: PR-1 in Vegas

Location
- Country: United States
- Territory: Puerto Rico
- Municipalities: Cayey

Highway system
- Roads in Puerto Rico; List
← PR-157	→ PR-159

Puerto Rico Highway 158 (PR-158) is a proposed connector to be located east of downtown Cayey in Puerto Rico. When completed, it will extend from PR-52 to PR-1.

== Route description ==
The proposed road would facilitate access to the urban area of Cayey from PR-52 to PR-1 between Vegas and Monte Llano barrios. However, the project is still in the phases of studying the land where it would be located and investigating the environmental impact of the area, since the area is agricultural and prone to flooding caused by the Río de la Plata. Among the most probable options is the creation of the connector near PR-738 and PR-743 with an interchange at PR-52.

== Major intersections ==
The entire route is located in Vegas, Cayey.

km	mi	Destinations	Notes
		PR-52	Southern terminus of PR-158; access to San Juan and Ponce
		PR-1	Northern terminus of PR-158; access to Cayey and Caguas
1.000 mi = 1.609 km; 1.000 km = 0.621 mi: Unopened
