= List of highways in Puerto Rico =

Puerto Rico Highway System
- Highway shields for primary, urban primary, secondary and tertiary sections of PR-1

Highway names
- Interstates: Interstate PRnn (PRI-nn) (unsigned)
- Commonwealth: Puerto Rico Highway nn (PR-nn)

System links
- Roads in Puerto Rico; List

The highway system in Puerto Rico is composed of approximately 14,400 kilometers (8,900 mi) of roads in Puerto Rico, maintained by the Puerto Rico Department of Transportation and Public Works (Spanish: Departmento de Transportación y Obras Públicas) or DTOP. The highway system in Puerto Rico is divided into four networks: primary, urban primary, secondary or inter-municipal, and tertiary or local (Spanish: red primaria, red primaria urbana, red secundaria o intermunicipal, and red terciaria o local). Highways may change between networks and retain their same numbers.

== Highway markers ==
Puerto Rico roads are classified according to the network they belong to. There are four types: primary, urban primary, secondary, and tertiary.

In this regard, a primary road is one which is part of the primary network, an urban primary road is part of the urban primary network, etc. Generally, the same highway may change between networks, but the highway will continue to have the same number. For example, PR-1, connecting Ponce and San Juan, is signed as urban primary inside the Ponce city limits, then it is signed as secondary in Ponce's rural barrio Capitanejo, and then it is again signed as urban primary on its entry into the town of Santa Isabel.

Primary roads are numbered 1 through 99, secondary roads are numbered 100 to 299, and tertiary roads are numbered 300 to 9999. In 2009, primary routes comprise about 14% of the total Commonwealth system mileage, secondary about 30%, and tertiary (municipal) about 56% of the total mileage.

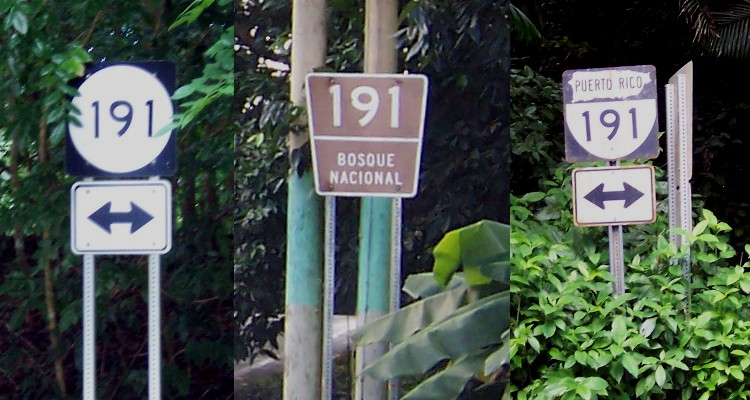
Route number markers on PR-191 in 2009; on the left is the tertiary highway marker, in the middle is a Forest Highway marker, and on the right is a pre-1999 marker.

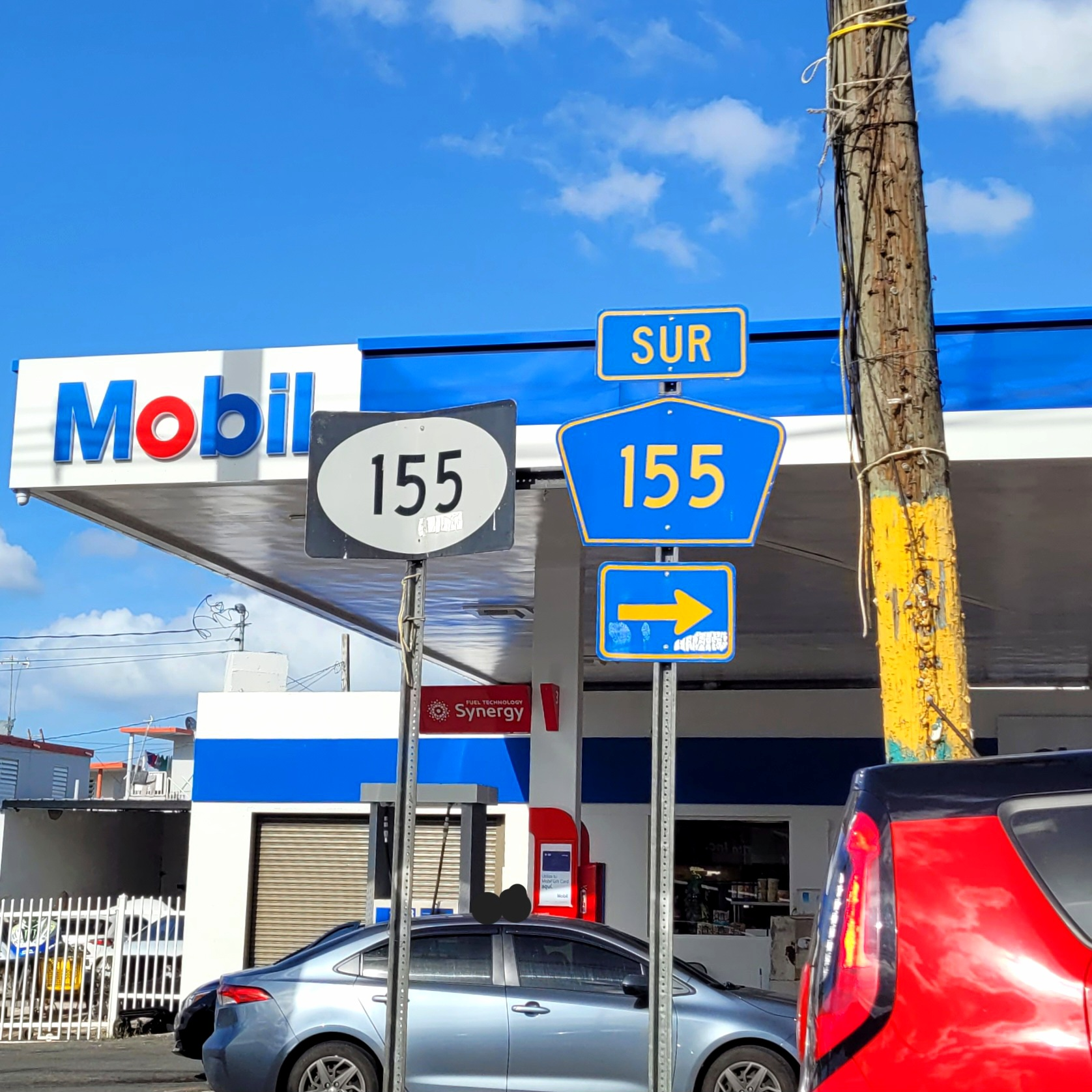
An example of route transition between networks

Highway network	Highway marker for Route 1	Purpose	Route numbers
Primary roads	A blue highway shield with a white numeral 1	Facilitate movement of passengers and freight between major regions in the Island (north, south, east, west)	1–99 (Note: Just as some highways numbered 1–99 may have secondary or tertiary network type markers on specific segments of their roadways, some highways numbered 100–299 may also have tertiary network markers—black numbers on white circles set against a black square—in specific segments of those highways, to indicate that such portions of the highway are part of the tertiary network.)
Urban primary roads	A white highway shield with a black numeral 1	Complement the primary network inside a metro area (San Juan, Ponce, Mayagüez, Arecibo, Aguadilla, Humacao, Caguas and Guayama)	Any (1–9999)
Secondary (or inter-municipal) roads	A blue pentagon-shaped highway marker with a yellow numeral 1	Provide access to municipalities from primary network roads	100–299
Tertiary (or intra-municipal) roads	A white circle sign with a black numeral 1	Provide access to a municipality's main urban area from peripheral communities	300–9999

=== Less common markers ===
Puerto Rico highway marker (pre-1999)

Puerto Rico National Forest road marker

At least two other markers can be observed in Puerto Rico roads today (2019). The first is the older style road marker which, above the route number, also had the outline of the main island of Puerto Rico with the words Puerto Rico on the outline as shown here. Until 1999, all non-tolled numbered highways in Puerto Rico had the same route marker, a square with a white-on-black half-circle with the route number in the bottom two thirds and a map of Puerto Rico with the words Puerto Rico written inside in the top third. A second road marker, used on the road through El Yunque National Forest, is the brown-colored upside-down trapezoidal marker with the road number on the top two-thirds of the sign and the words Bosque Nacional (national forest) on the bottom one-third, as shown.

== Roadway maintenance ==
All Puerto Rico Highway System roads, regardless of the classification used, are maintained by the centralized, Commonwealth-level, Departmento de Transportación y Obras Públicas (DTOP). Municipal governments are not responsible for maintenance of the Puerto Rico Highway System roads within their territory; whether or not the municipal government is an autonomous government, DTOP is the responsible agency. The DTOP maintains a network of regional offices throughout the island which carry out DTOP work within their multi-municipality region. Municipal governments are only responsible for maintenance of city and town streets within their jurisdictions. On occasion, the central government has entered into memoranda of agreement with municipal governments for the collaborative maintenance of some Puerto Rico Highway System roadways within their municipalities.

== Municipal roads ==
In Puerto Rico, the term municipal road may be encountered occasionally. This is not a “fourth” network of State roads. Roadways that have both their terminus within the same municipality are called tertiary roads and are, by convention, numbered PR-300 through PR-9999. Tertiary roads are also sometimes called Carreteras de la red local (English: Local network roads).

However, the term municipal road or municipal highway (Spanish: Carretera municipal) refers to any public roadway that is not marked with a Puerto Rico road marker. Roadways marked with a Puerto Rico road marker are those public roadways that include PR followed by a number in its markers. Such roads are considered State roads and part of the Puerto Rico Highway System. Public roadways that do not include such markings are termed municipal roadways. Unlike State roads, which are signed with numbers, municipal roads are signed with names, such as Calle Hostos, Calle De Diego, Calle San Jorge, Calle León M. Acuña.

Tertiary roads are not municipal roads even though at times the term municipal road has been used (as a shortcut to intra-municipal road)—even by the Government of Puerto Rico—to refer to a tertiary State road. The confusion comes from the context in which the phrase municipal road occurs. When the term municipal road occurs in the context of roads owned and maintained by the State government, municipal roads means tertiary State network roads. In this context, a municipal road and a State tertiary road both refer to the same network of State roads. However, if the term occurs in the context of roadways owned and maintained by a municipal government, it refers to the network of local streets and roadways that make up the urban landscape of a municipality.

Another context sometimes encountered is the context of how a road is used, that is, the purpose of a road. The purpose of a road is indicative of whether a road is a municipal road or not. In its strictest meaning, the term municipal roads refers to roads within a municipality's urban center that provide access from one urban neighborhood to another urban neighborhood within the same urban area (city, town, poblado, etc.), while in the larger context of the State highway system, municipal roads refers to roads that “provide access to the main urban area of a municipality from peripheral communities” (that is, tertiary roads). Municipal roads are maintained by the municipal government where those roads occur, while tertiary roads are maintained by the State government. As stated under the section Road maintenance, at times the State government has entered into Memorandums of Agreement with municipal governments for the upkeep of a State tertiary roadway (note this is a State-owned road that runs entirely within a single municipality), but this does not make it a municipal road—the road continues to maintain its State signage and ownership.

== Expressways ==
Highways with control access fall into three types: An expressway is an arterial highway with full or partial control of access. Expressways with full control of access are termed freeways. If the freeway charges a toll for its use, it is called an autopista. Most tollbooths accept the AutoExpreso, an electronic toll collection system, to avoid traffic congestion. Toll roads between San Juan and Arecibo, and between San Juan and Ponce were envisioned by J. Raymond Watson, a Puerto Rican engineer, in 1970.

All Puerto Rico expressways are signed either as primary or as urban primary routes.

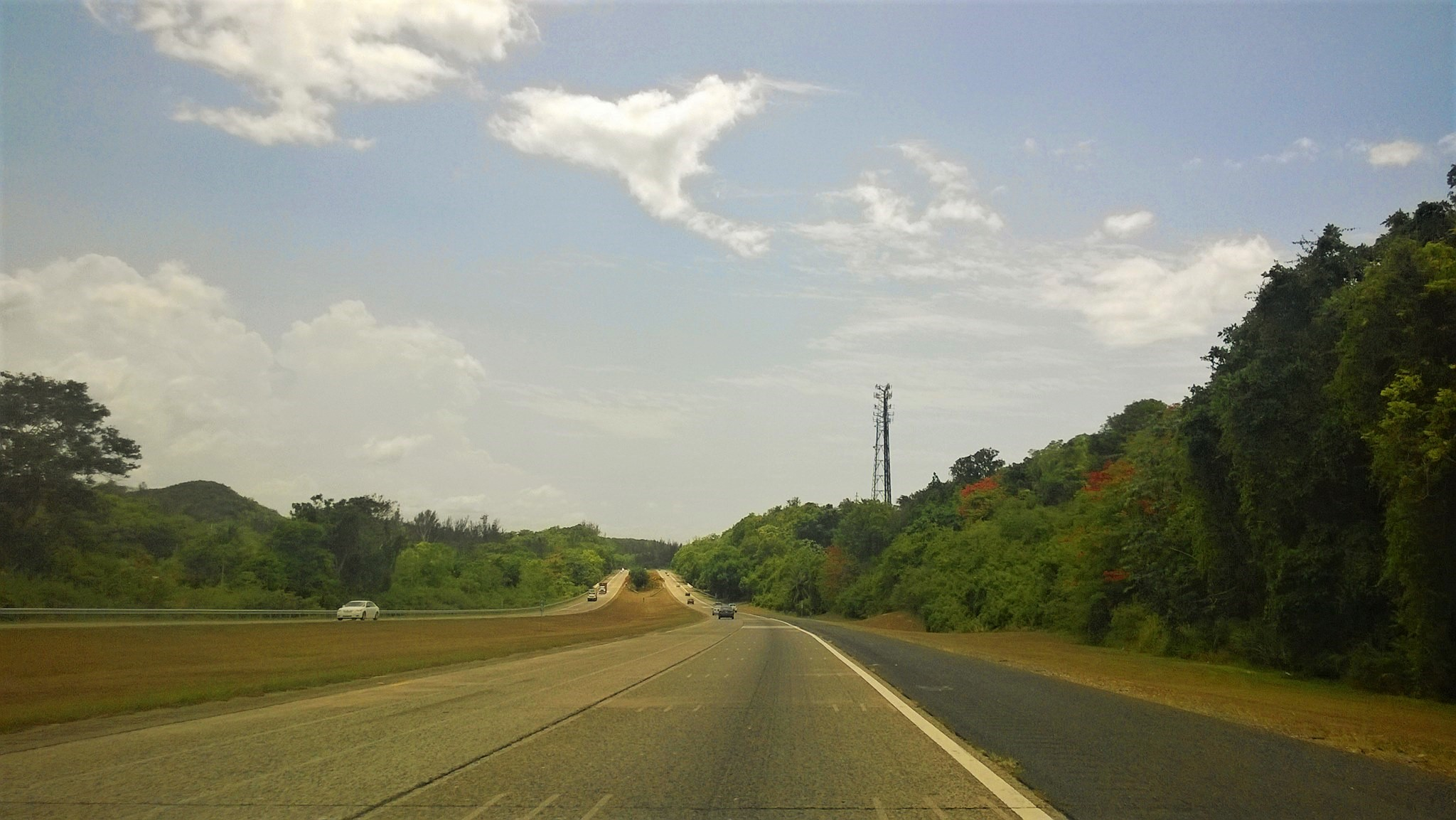
Autopista José de Diego (PR-22) heading west in Arecibo

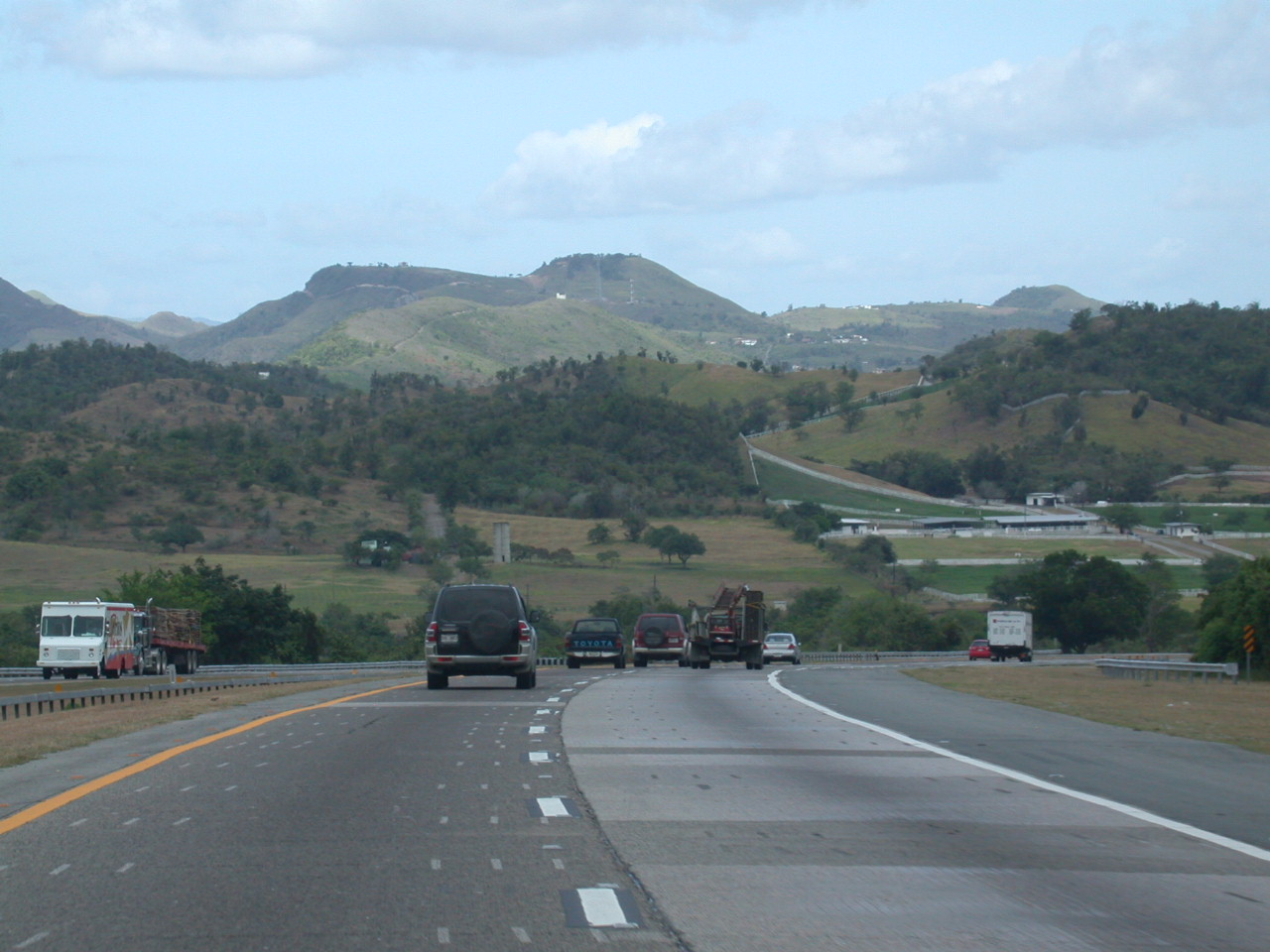
Autopista Luis A. Ferré (PR-52) heading east from Juana Díaz towards Santa Isabel

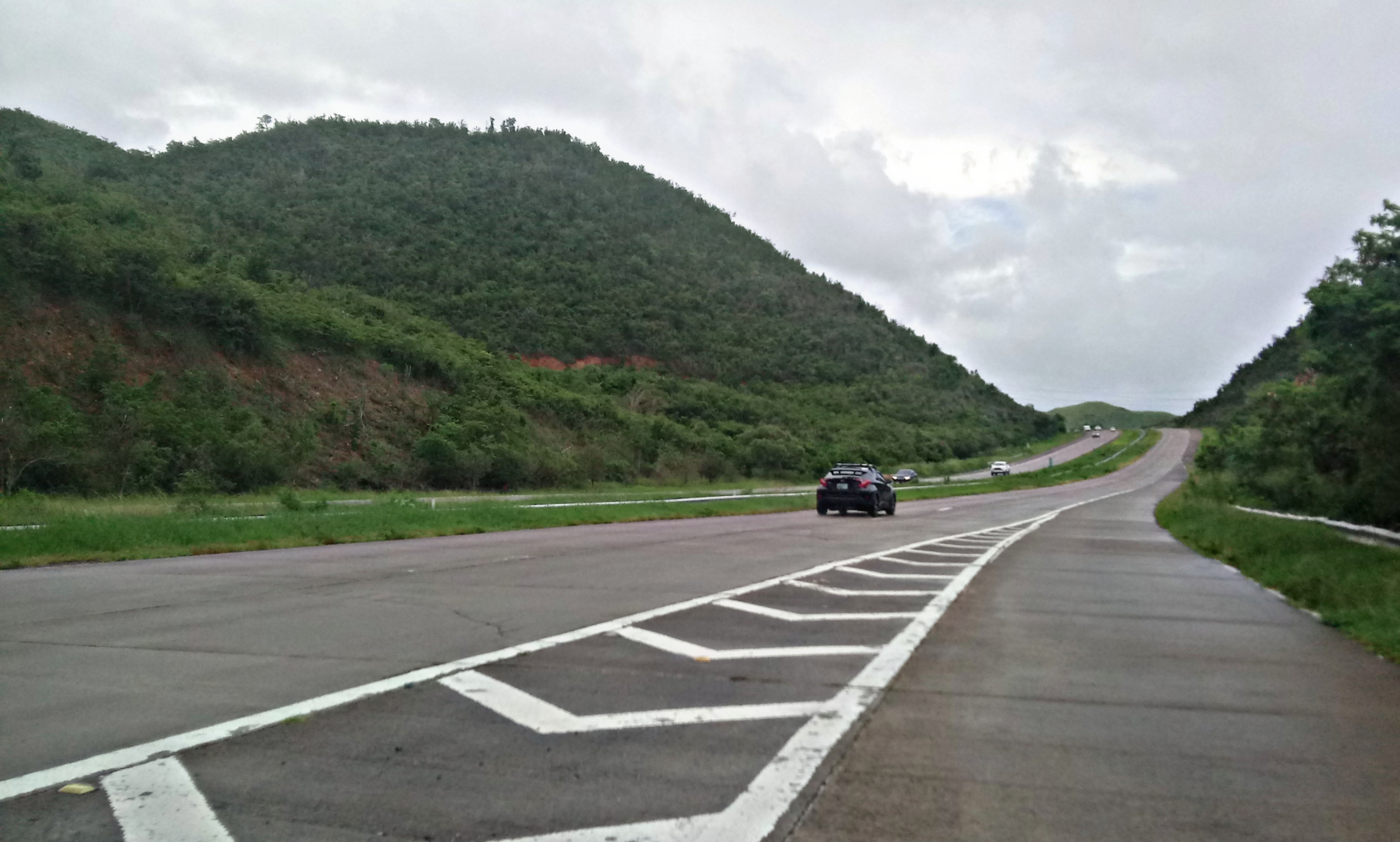
Autopista José M. Dávila Monsanto (PR-53) heading east in Guayama

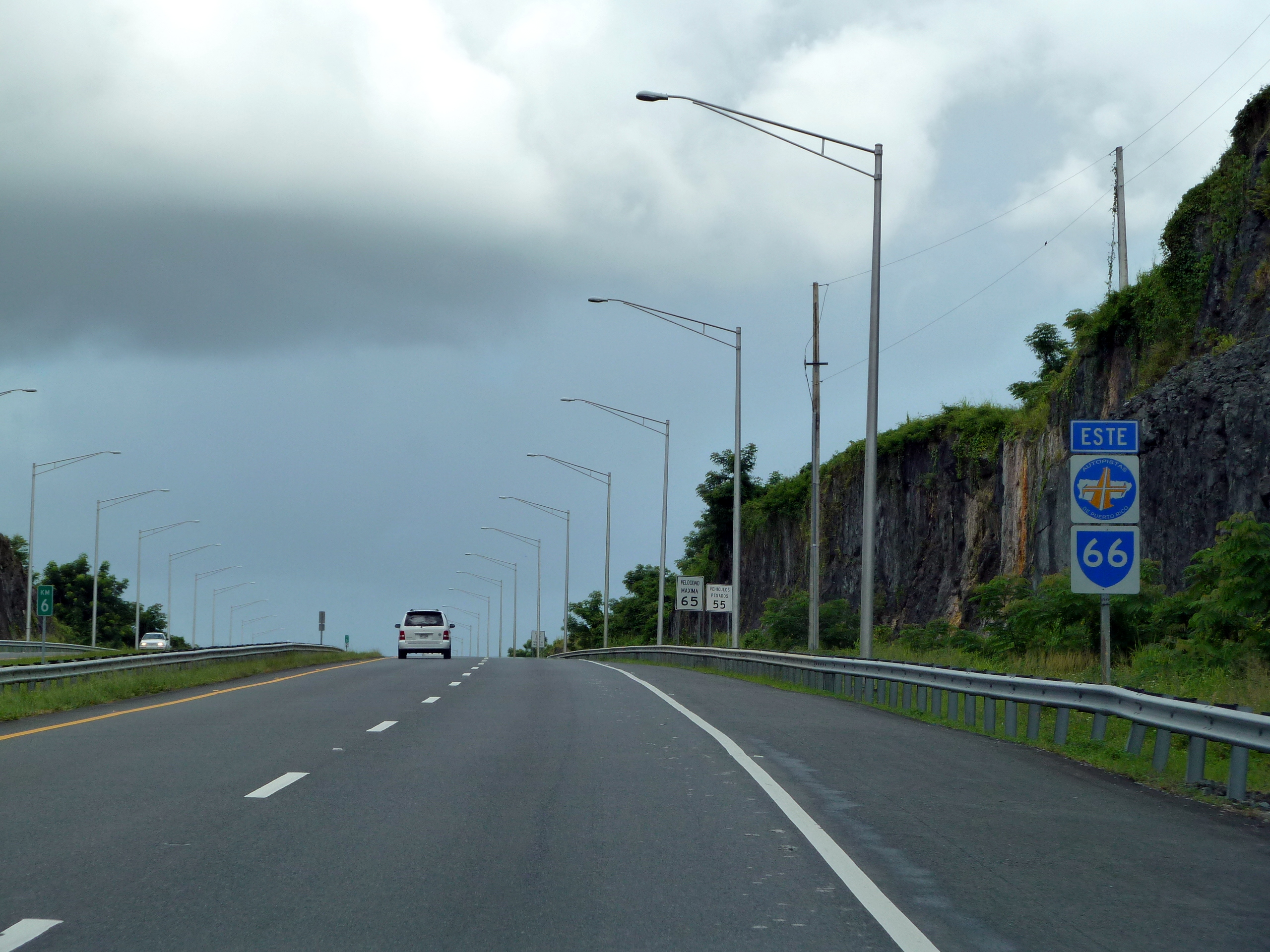
A stretch of Autopista Roberto Sánchez Vilella (PR-66) heading east to Río Grande

Route	Name	Terminus	Maximum speed limit	Notes
PR-2	Expreso Kennedy	Starts from San Patricio Plaza (Guaynabo) to Santurce (San Juan, aka Parada 18).	50 mph (80 km/h)	Guaynabo to San Juan section only.
PR-2	Roberto Sánchez Vilella	Starts from Mayagüez Mall (Mayagüez) to PR-1 in Ponce	55 mph (90 km/h)	Mostly converted to expressway from Mayagüez Mall to Ponce.
PR-5	Expreso Río Hondo	Bayamón, PR-22 to Naranjito, PR-147 and PR-149 with discontinuity between PR-199 in Bayamón and PR-167 in Toa Alta.	50 mph (80 km/h)	Tolled. This road has three expressway segments as of April 2012—these are between PR-29 and PR-22 and between PR-2 and PR-199 (both in Bayamón), an unbuilt portion in southern Bayamón and a portion between PR-167 (Toa Alta) and the town of Naranjito.
PR-9	Baldorioty de Castro	PR-10 Barrio Portugués to PR-2 Barrio El Tuque	55 miles per hour (89 km/h) to 65 miles per hour (105 km/h)	From PR-123 to PR-2 still under construction
PR-12	Santiago de los Caballeros	PR-14 Barrio Machuelo Abajo to PR-123 Barrio Playa	55 miles per hour (89 km/h)	
PR-18	Expreso Las Américas	PR-22 San Juan and PR-52 San Juan	55 to 65 mph (90 to 110 km/h)	
PR-20	Expreso Rafael Martínez Nadal	PR-2 in the San Patricio area in Guaynabo to PR-1 in La Muda sector in Caguas	55 mph (90 km/h)	Tolled
PR-22	Autopista José de Diego	Hatillo, PR-2 to San Juan, PR-26	65 mph (105 km/h)	Extension to Aguadilla in planning. Tolled
PR-26	Expreso Román Baldorioty de Castro	San Antonio Bridge (Bridge to Old San Juan Island) to PR-3 in Carolina.	65 mph (105 km/h)	
PR-30	Expreso Cruz Ortiz Stella	Caguas, PR-1 to Humacao, PR-53	55 mph (90 km/h)	
PR-52	Autopista Luis A. Ferré	Ponce, PR-2 to San Juan, PR-1 and PR-18	65 mph (105 km/h)	Tolled. This highway is the longest tolled freeway in Puerto Rico.
PR-53	Autopista Dr. José Celso Barbosa	Fajardo through Ceiba to Yabucoa, and then Guayama to Salinas.	65 mph (105 km/h)	Maunabo tunnels constructed in October 2008. The segments between Yabucoa and Maunabo still incomplete.
PR-60	Avenida Dionisio Casillas	Humacao, PR-30 to Humacao, PR-3	55 mph (90 km/h)	
PR-66	Autopista Roberto Sánchez Vilella	PR-3 in Carolina and Río Grande	65 mph (105 km/h)	Second half opened in October 2012 to Río Grande. Tolled.
PR-165	Expreso El Caño	Guaynabo, PR-2 and PR-23 to Cataño	50 mph (80 km/h)	

== List of highways ==
Below is a list of some highways in Puerto Rico along with the municipalities where they begin and end.

=== Primary highways ===
Primary roads are numbered in the 1 to 99 range and are distributed randomly throughout the island.

Number	Length (mi)	Length (km)	Southern or western terminus	Northern or eastern terminus	Formed	Removed	Notes
PR-1	79.6	128.1	PR-123 in Ponce	Calle Tanca in San Juan	—	—	Carretera Central
PR-2	143.0	230.1	PR-1 / PR-133 in Ponce	PR-26 in San Juan	—	—	
PR-2R	0.5	0.80	PR-440 in Aguadilla	PR-2 in Aguadilla	—	—	Aguadilla business spur
PR-2R	—	—	PR-2 / PR-114 in Mayagüez	PR-2 in Mayagüez	—	—	Mayagüez business loop; renumbered to PR-239
PR-2R	1.01	1.63	PR-2 / PR-5549 in Ponce	PR-123 in Ponce	—	—	Ponce business spur; formerly PR-2
PR-3	99.9	160.8	PR-1 in Salinas	PR-1 in San Juan	—	—	
PR-3R	0.87	1.40	PR-3 in Humacao	PR-3 in Humacao	—	—	Humacao business loop
PR-4	—	—	PR-17 in San Juan	PR-26 in Carolina	—	—	Became part of PR-8
PR-4	—	—	PR-114 in Hormigueros	PR-102 in San Germán	—	—	Renumbered to PR-103 and PR-101
PR-5	16.0	25.7	PR-152 / PR-164 in Naranjito	Calle Canal in Cataño	2006	current	Tolled in Bayamón. Exists in two segments due to an unconstructed portion in Bayamón.
PR-5	—	—	PR-2 in Aguadilla	PR-2 in Aguadilla	1953	—	Renumbered to PR-107 and PR-110
PR-6	1.1	1.8	PR-2 in Bayamón	PR-5 in Bayamón	—	—	Formerly PR-21
PR-8	2.5	4.0	PR-17 in San Juan	PR-3 in San Juan	—	—	Formerly PR-4
PR-9	4.52	7.27	PR-2 / PR-52 in Ponce	PR-10 in Ponce	—	—	Exists in two portions, as the portion between PR-123 and PR-500 is actually under construction.
PR-10	42.42	68.27	PR-5506 in Ponce	PR-2 in Arecibo	—	—	Exists in two segments due to a still-under-construction portion between Adjuntas and Utuado. Much of old route now PR-123; the current alignment dates from 1974.
PR-12	3.28	5.28	Port of Ponce	PR-14 in Ponce	1960 (Note: The segment south of the Ponce Bypass (PR-2) was built in 1960. The segment north of PR-2 was built in the 1990s, and completed in 2002.)	current	
PR-14	45.4	73.1	PR-123 / PR-123P in Ponce	PR-1 in Cayey	—	—	Carretera Central
PR-14R	0.56	0.90	PR-123 / PR-123P in Ponce	PR-14 / PR-14P in Ponce	—	—	Ponce business spur
PR-15	16.03	25.80	PR-3 in Guayama	PR-14 in Cayey	1953	current	Part of the Ruta Panorámica
PR-16	0.53	0.85	Calle Miraflores in San Juan	PR-1 / PR-26 in San Juan	—	—	
PR-17	7.1	11.4	PR-19 in San Juan	PR-26 in Carolina	—	—	Tolled at the Teodoro Moscoso Bridge.
PR-18	3.78	6.08	PR-1 / PR-52 in San Juan	PR-22 in San Juan	—	—	
PR-19	1.2	1.9	PR-21 in San Juan	PR-2 in Guaynabo	—	—	PR-19 is the main avenue in San Patricio, Guaynabo.
PR-20	6.03	9.70	PR-1 in Guaynabo	PR-2 in Guaynabo	—	—	Tolled
PR-21	3.1	5.0	PR-19 in San Juan	PR-1 / PR-176 in San Juan	—	—	
PR-22	52.01	83.70	PR-2 in Hatillo	PR-26 in San Juan	1969	current	Tolled; portion of unsigned Interstate PRI-2
PR-23	4.0	6.4	PR-2 / PR-165 in Guaynabo	PR-27 in San Juan	—	—	
PR-24	1.1	1.8	PR-165 in Guaynabo	PR-888 in Cataño	—	—	
PR-25	6.9	11.1	PR-3 in San Juan	Calle Fortaleza / Calle Recinto Sur in San Juan	—	—	Avenida Juan Ponce de León
PR-25R	1.7	2.7	PR-1 in San Juan	PR-25 in San Juan	—	—	
PR-26	9.63	15.50	PR-1 / PR-16 in San Juan	PR-3 / PR-66 in Carolina	—	—	
PR-27	3.0	4.8	PR-3 in San Juan	PR-36 in San Juan	—	—	
PR-28	3.7	6.0	PR-5 in Bayamón	PR-2 in San Juan	—	—	
PR-29	2.2	3.5	PR-2 in Bayamón	PR-5 in Bayamón	—	—	
PR-30	19.08	30.71	PR-1 in Caguas	PR-53 in Humacao	—	—	
PR-31	15.88	25.56	PR-30 / PR-189 in Juncos	PR-3 in Naguabo	1953	current	
PR-32	4.5	7.2	PR-172 in Caguas	PR-1 in Caguas	—	—	
PR-33	1.37	2.20	PR-183 in Caguas	PR-1 / PR-189 in Caguas	—	—	
PR-34	3.7	6.0	PR-196 in Caguas	PR-183 in Caguas	—	—	
PR-35	2.5	4.0	PR-1 in San Juan	PR-16 in San Juan	—	—	
PR-36	0.93	1.50	PR-25 in San Juan	PR-27 in San Juan	—	—	
PR-37	4.2	6.8	PR-35 in San Juan	PR-187 in Carolina	—	—	
PR-38	0.67	1.08	Calle Recinto Sur in San Juan	PR-25 in San Juan	—	—	
PR-39	0.56	0.90	PR-1 in San Juan	PR-25 in San Juan	—	—	
PR-40	0.56	0.90	PR-25 in San Juan	PR-27 in San Juan	—	—	
PR-41	1.5	2.4	PR-17 in San Juan	PR-25 in San Juan	—	—	
PR-42	0.62	1.00	PR-39 in San Juan	Calle Lafayette in San Juan	—	—	
PR-47	1.7	2.7	Calle Ferrocarril / Paseo De Diego in San Juan	PR-3 in San Juan	—	—	
PR-52	67.30	108.31	PR-2 / PR-9 in Ponce	PR-1 / PR-18 in San Juan	1968	current	Tolled; portion of unsigned Interstate PRI-1
PR-53	58.4	94.0	PR-52 in Salinas	PR-3 in Fajardo	1988	current	Tolled. Exists in four portions due to unconstructed segments between Guayama and Yabucoa; portion of unsigned Interstate PRI-3
PR-54	3.85	6.20	PR-53 in Guayama	PR-3 / PR-748 in Guayama	—	—	
PR-60	2.21	3.56	PR-30 in Humacao	PR-3 in Humacao	—	—	Former portion of PR-30
PR-63	0.37	0.60	PR-102 in Mayagüez	PR-2 in Mayagüez	—	—	
PR-64	3.4	5.5	PR-102 / PR-3342 in Mayagüez	PR-2 / PR-342 in Mayagüez	—	—	
PR-65	0.57	0.92	PR-239 in Mayagüez	PR-106 in Mayagüez	—	—	
PR-66	12.1	19.5	PR-3 / PR-26 in Carolina	PR-3 / PR-187 in Río Grande	2006	current	Tolled; portion of unsigned Interstate PRI-3
Former

=== Secondary highways ===
Secondary roads are numbered in the 100 to 299 range. Unlike primary highways, which are numbered randomly throughout the island, secondary highways generally follow a grid pattern. They begin from the southwest portion of the island with PR-100 and increase in number as you progress in a northeasterly fashion. PR-100 is located in the southwestern town of Cabo Rojo, whilst PR-198 is in Juncos, Las Piedras and Humacao in the eastern part of Puerto Rico. The highest secondary highway number assigned so far (February 2014) is 252 (PR-252), located in the northeastern municipality-island of Culebra. A few roads “violate” this grid order; for example, PR-199 lies in Guaynabo and San Juan.

Number	Length (mi)	Length (km)	Southern or western terminus	Northern or eastern terminus	Formed	Removed	Notes
PR-100	10.1	16.3	PR-301 in Cabo Rojo	PR-2 in Hormigueros	—	—	
PR-101	11.9	19.2	Calle José de Diego in Cabo Rojo	PR-102 in San Germán	—	—	
PR-102	25.8	41.5	PR-104 in Mayagüez	PR-121 / PR-368 in Sabana Grande	—	—	
PR-103	8.1	13.0	PR-101 in Cabo Rojo	PR-114 in Cabo Rojo	1953	current	
PR-104	1.1	1.8	PR-3108 in Mayagüez	PR-2 in Mayagüez	—	—	
PR-105	27.5	44.3	Calle Tamarindo in Mayagüez	PR-128 in Maricao	—	—	Part of the Ruta Panorámica
PR-106	11.7	18.8	Calle Méndez Vigo / Calle Oriente in Mayagüez	PR-120 in Las Marías	—	—	Part of the Ruta Panorámica
PR-107	2.8	4.5	PR-2 in Aguadilla	Borinquen Road in Aguadilla	—	—	
PR-108	13.7	22.0	Calle Méndez Vigo in Mayagüez	PR-109 in Añasco	—	—	
PR-109	18.3	29.5	PR-2 in Añasco	PR-119 in San Sebastián	—	—	
PR-110	20.5	33.0	PR-2 in Añasco	Cliff Road / San Antonio Road in Aguadilla	—	—	
PR-110R	—	—	PR-110 in Moca	PR-110 in Moca	—	—	Moca business loop; renumbered to PR-4025
PR-110R	—	—	PR-110 in Aguadilla	Ramey Air Force Base in Aguadilla	—	—	Aguadilla spur; renumbered to PR-4010
PR-111	41.9	67.4	PR-2 / PR-1107 in Aguadilla	PR-140 in Utuado	1953	current	
PR-111R	—	—	PR-111 in Aguadilla	PR-111 in Aguadilla	—	—	Aguadilla business loop; renumbered to PR-1107P
PR-111R	—	—	PR-119 / PR-125 in San Sebastián	PR-111 in San Sebastián	—	—	San Sebastián spur; renumbered to PR-125
PR-111R	—	—	PR-111 in Lares	PR-111 in Lares	—	—	Lares business loop; renumbered to PR-1111
PR-111R	—	—	PR-123 in Utuado	PR-111 in Utuado	—	—	Utuado business loop; renumbered to PR-6111
PR-112	11.2	18.0	PR-125 in Moca	PR-113 / PR-459 in Isabela	—	—	
PR-113	12.3	19.8	PR-112 / PR-459 in Isabela	PR-119 in Camuy	1953	current	
PR-114	9.1	14.6	PR-2 / PR-239 in Mayagüez	PR-102 in San Germán	—	—	
PR-115	17.3	27.8	PR-2 / PR-109 in Añasco	PR-1107 in Aguadilla	—	—	
PR-115R	—	—	PR-417 in Aguada	PR-115 in Aguada	—	—	Aguada business spur; renumbered to PR-4415
PR-116	16.5	26.6	PR-101 in Lajas	PR-2 in Guánica	1953	current	
PR-116R	—	—	PR-116 in Guánica	PR-116 in Guánica	—	—	Guánica business loop; renumbered to PR-4116
PR-116R	—	—	PR-116 in Guánica	PR-121 in Yauco	—	—	Renumbered to PR-1116, now PR-326
PR-117	8.1	13.0	PR-315 in Lajas	PR-121 in Sabana Grande	—	—	
PR-118	3.1	5.0	PR-117 in Lajas	PR-102 in San Germán	—	—	
PR-119	49.5	79.7	PR-2 in San Germán	PR-2 in Hatillo	1953	current	Part of the Ruta Panorámica
PR-120	20.4	32.8	Calle Neponucema Santiago / Calle 65 de Infantería in Sabana Grande	PR-124 in Las Marías	—	—	Part of the Ruta Panorámica
PR-121	9.6	15.4	PR-102 / PR-368 in Sabana Grande	PR-127 / PR-128 in Yauco	—	—	
PR-122	4.2	6.8	PR-116 in Lajas	PR-2 in San Germán	—	—	Exists in two segments due to a still-under-construction portion between Lajas and San Germán.
PR-123	48.72	78.41	PR-12 in Ponce	PR-10 / PR-6609 in Arecibo	c. 1910	current	Was PR-10 until 1974
PR-124	16.7	26.9	PR-119 in Las Marías	PR-1111 in Lares	1953	current	
PR-125	13.1	21.1	PR-111 in Aguadilla	PR-111 in San Sebastián	—	—	Formerly PR-111
PR-125R	0.59	0.95	PR-125 in San Sebastián	PR-109 in San Sebastián	—	—	San Sebastián business spur
PR-127	11.0	17.7	PR-121 / PR-128 in Yauco	PR-2 in Peñuelas	—	—	
PR-128	36.5	58.7	PR-2 / PR-3334 in Yauco	PR-1111 / PR-4128 in Lares	1953	current	Part of the Ruta Panorámica
PR-129	26.8	43.1	PR-135 in Adjuntas	PR-2 in Arecibo	1953	current	
PR-130	7.5	12.1	PR-129 in Hatillo	PR-119 in Hatillo	1953	current	
PR-131	5.0	8.0	Guilarte Forest in Adjuntas	PR-135 in Adjuntas	1953	current	Part of the Ruta Panorámica
PR-132	16.16	26.01	PR-2 / PR-136 in Guayanilla	PR-123 in Ponce	1953	current	
PR-133	1.2	1.9	PR-123 / PR-1P in Ponce	PR-1 / PR-2 in Ponce	—	—	
PR-134	10.9	17.5	PR-111 in Lares	PR-129 in Hatillo	—	—	Formerly PR-129
PR-135	14.0	22.5	PR-128 in Lares	PR-123 in Adjuntas	1953	current	Part of the Ruta Panorámica
PR-136	0.21	0.34	PR-127 in Guayanilla	PR-2 / PR-132 in Guayanilla	—	—	
PR-137	11.1	17.9	PR-155 in Morovis	PR-2 in Vega Baja	—	—	
PR-138	1.6	2.6	PR-14 / PR-153 in Coamo	PR-155 in Coamo	—	—	
PR-139	15.7	25.3	PR-10 / PR-14 in Ponce	PR-143 in Ponce	—	—	
PR-139R	1.8	2.9	PR-139 / PR-5139 in Ponce	Parque Luis A. "Wito" Morales in Ponce	—	—	Spur to Parque Luis A. "Wito" Morales and Cerillos Dam
PR-140	43.4	69.8	PR-143 in Jayuya	PR-2 in Barceloneta	1953	current	
PR-141	12.9	20.8	PR-144 in Jayuya	PR-140 in Utuado	1953	current	
PR-142	5.10	8.21	PR-159 in Corozal	PR-2 in Dorado	—	—	
PR-143	36.5	58.7	PR-123 in Adjuntas	PR-162 in Barranquitas	1953	current	Part of the Ruta Panorámica
PR-144	11.4	18.3	PR-140 in Jayuya	PR-149 in Ciales	1953	current	
PR-145	4.7	7.6	PR-146 / PR-149 in Ciales	PR-155 / PR-634 in Morovis	—	—	
PR-146	17.6	28.3	PR-123 in Arecibo	PR-145 / PR-149 in Ciales	—	—	
PR-147	—	—	PR-152 / PR-164 in Naranjito	PR-164 in Naranjito	—	—	Became part of PR-5
PR-148	0.5	0.80	PR-164 / PR-167 in Naranjito	PR-5 / PR-826 in Naranjito	—	—	
PR-149	45.3	72.9	PR-1 in Juana Díaz	PR-22 in Manatí	1953	current	
PR-149R	0.7	1.1	PR-149 in Villalba	PR-149 in Villalba	—	—	Villalba business loop; formerly PR-149
PR-150	13.5	21.7	PR-149R in Villalba	PR-14 in Coamo	1953	current	
PR-151	7.8	12.6	PR-150 in Villalba	PR-143 in Villalba	1953	current	
PR-152	12.6	20.3	PR-156 in Barranquitas	PR-5 / PR-164 in Naranjito	1953	current	
PR-152R	2.0	3.2	PR-143 in Barranquitas	PR-152 in Barranquitas	—	—	Barranquitas bypass
PR-153	8.9	14.3	PR-1 in Santa Isabel	PR-14 / PR-138 in Coamo	1953	current	
PR-154	2.5	4.0	PR-153 in Coamo	PR-543 in Coamo	1953	current	
PR-155	42.9	69.0	PR-14 in Coamo	PR-2 / PR-688 in Vega Baja	1953	current	
PR-156	36.5	58.7	PR-597 / PR-5155 in Orocovis	PR-1P in Caguas	1953	current	
PR-157	15.1	24.3	PR-149 in Ciales	PR-155 in Orocovis	1953	current	
PR-158	—	—	PR-52 in Cayey	PR-1 in Cayey	proposed	—	
PR-158	—	—	PR-1 in Juana Díaz	Fort Allen in Juana Díaz	—	—	Now Calle 158
PR-159	12.8	20.6	PR-155 / PR-6623 in Morovis	PR-165 in Toa Alta	1953	current	
PR-160	9.5	15.3	PR-159 in Morovis	PR-2 in Vega Baja	1953	current	
PR-161	1.5	2.4	PR-1 in Santa Isabel	PR-1 in Santa Isabel	—	—	Santa Isabel northern bypass
PR-162	11.8	19.0	PR-1 in Aibonito	PR-156 in Barranquitas	1953	current	
PR-163	2.8	4.5	PR-500 in Ponce	PR-2 in Ponce	1960	current	Part of the Avenida Las Américas
PR-164	10.2	16.4	PR-159 in Corozal	PR-148 / PR-167 in Naranjito	1953	current	
PR-165	24.2	38.9	PR-164 in Naranjito	PR-2 / PR-23 in Guaynabo	1953	current	
PR-165R	0.4	0.64	PR-165 in Toa Alta	PR-861 in Toa Alta	—	—	Toa Alta business spur
PR-166	1.7	2.7	PR-102 in San Germán	PR-122 in San Germán	—	—	
PR-167	17.6	28.3	PR-156 / PR-7167 in Comerío	PR-165 in Toa Baja	1953	current	
PR-168	1.1	1.8	PR-2 in Bayamón	Calle Reverendo Domingo Marrero Navarro / Calle Río Cialitos in Bayamón	—	—	
PR-169	3.1	5.0	PR-1 / PR-8834 in Guaynabo	PR-20 in Guaynabo	—	—	
PR-170	1.4	2.3	PR-206 in Cayey	PR-14 / PR-731 in Cayey	1953	current	
PR-171	5.2	8.4	PR-14 in Cayey	PR-172 / PR-734 in Cidra	1953	current	
PR-172	17.6	28.3	PR-156 in Comerío	PR-1 in Caguas	1953	current	
PR-173	20.0	32.2	PR-14 in Aibonito	PR-1 / PR-8834 in Guaynabo	1953	current	
PR-174	14.1	22.7	PR-156 in Aguas Buenas	PR-5 in Bayamón	—	—	
PR-175	8.1	13.0	PR-1 in Caguas	PR-181 / PR-8860 in Trujillo Alto	1953	current	
PR-176	7.3	11.7	PR-175 in Trujillo Alto	PR-1 / PR-21 in San Juan	1953	current	
PR-177	6.5	10.5	PR-174 in Bayamón	PR-176 in San Juan	—	—	
PR-178	2.0	3.2	PR-3 in Arroyo	PR-3 / PR-753 in Arroyo	1953	current	Arroyo business loop
PR-179	12.6	20.3	PR-15 in Guayama	PR-184 in Cayey	—	—	Part of the Ruta Panorámica
PR-180	1.7	2.7	PR-701 in Salinas	PR-1 / PR-52 in Salinas	—	—	Salinas bypass
PR-181	42.66	68.65	PR-3 in Patillas	PR-17 in San Juan	1953	current	Part of the Ruta Panorámica
PR-182	9.9	15.9	PR-181 in Yabucoa	PR-3 in Yabucoa	1953	current	Part of the Ruta Panorámica
PR-183	13.9	22.4	PR-1 in Caguas	PR-198 in Las Piedras	1953	current	
PR-184	20.8	33.5	PR-3 in Patillas	PR-1 in Cidra	1953	current	Part of the Ruta Panorámica
PR-185	13.1	21.1	PR-30 in Juncos	PR-9959 in Canóvanas	1953	current	
PR-186	16.7	26.9	PR-185 in Canóvanas	PR-3 in Río Grande	1953	current	
PR-187	18.7	30.1	PR-26 in Carolina	PR-3 / PR-66 in Río Grande	1953	current	
PR-187R	0.68	1.09	PR-3 in Río Grande	PR-187 in Río Grande	—	—	Río Grande business spur
PR-188	3.6	5.8	PR-3 / PR-9188 in Canóvanas	PR-187 in Loíza	—	—	
PR-189	9.4	15.1	PR-1 / PR-33 in Caguas	PR-30 / PR-31 in Juncos	—	—	
PR-190	2.5	4.0	PR-3 / PR-8887 in Carolina	PR-26 in Carolina	—	—	
PR-191	14.9	24.0	PR-31 in Naguabo	PR-3 in Río Grande	1953	current	Exists in two segments in the El Yunque National Forest.
PR-192	1.9	3.1	PR-3 in Naguabo	PR-31 in Naguabo	1953	current	
PR-193	1.5	2.4	PR-3 in Luquillo	PR-3 / PR-992 in Luquillo	—	—	Luquillo business loop
PR-194	3.0	4.8	PR-3 in Fajardo	PR-3 / PR-940 in Fajardo	—	—	
PR-195	2.1	3.4	PR-3 in Fajardo	Port of Fajardo	—	—	
PR-196	1.7	2.7	PR-156 in Caguas	PR-1 in Caguas	—	—	
PR-198	9.2	14.8	PR-31 in Juncos	PR-3 in Humacao	—	—	
PR-198R	0.50	0.80	PR-198 in Humacao	PR-198 in Humacao	—	—	
PR-199	13.4	21.6	Urbanización Portobello in Toa Alta	PR-181 / PR-876 in Trujillo Alto	—	—	PR-199 exists into two segments due to an unconstructed portion between Bayamón and Guaynabo.
PR-200	3.91	6.29	PR-994 in Vieques	Barrio Puerto Diablo in Vieques	—	—	
PR-200R	0.93	1.50	PR-200 in Vieques	Sector Santa María in Vieques	—	—	
PR-201	4.47	7.19	Barrio Llave in Vieques	PR-200 in Vieques	—	—	
PR-203	4.2	6.8	PR-183 / PR-9931 in San Lorenzo	PR-30 in Gurabo	—	—	
PR-204	1.4	2.3	PR-183 in Las Piedras	PR-198 in Las Piedras	—	—	
PR-204	—	—	PR-2 in Barceloneta	PR-140 in Barceloneta	—	—	Renumbered to PR-140
PR-205	0.25	0.40	PR-31 in Naguabo	PR-53 in Naguabo	—	—	
PR-206	1.1	1.8	PR-1 in Cayey	PR-14 in Cayey	—	—	
PR-208	—	—	PR-156 in Aguas Buenas	PR-156 in Aguas Buenas	proposed	—	Aguas Buenas northern bypass
PR-212	1.6	2.6	PR-2 / PR-4494 in Isabela	PR-4472 in Isabela	—	—	Formerly portion of PR-4494 extension
PR-238	3.1	5.0	PR-153 in Coamo	PR-14 in Coamo	—	—	Former portion of PR-138
PR-239	3.3	5.3	PR-2 / PR-114 in Mayagüez	PR-2 in Mayagüez	—	—	Formerly PR-2R
PR-250	5.47	8.80	Port of Culebra	Zoni Beach in Culebra	—	—	Formerly PR-998
PR-251	1.74	2.80	PR-250 in Culebra	Flamenco Beach in Culebra	—	—	Formerly PR-999
PR-252	0.93	1.50	PR-250 in Culebra	Barrio Playa Sardinas I in Culebra	—	—	
PR-253	1.99	3.20	Calle Punta Soldado in Culebra	PR-250 in Culebra	—	—	
Former; Proposed and unbuilt

=== Tertiary highways ===
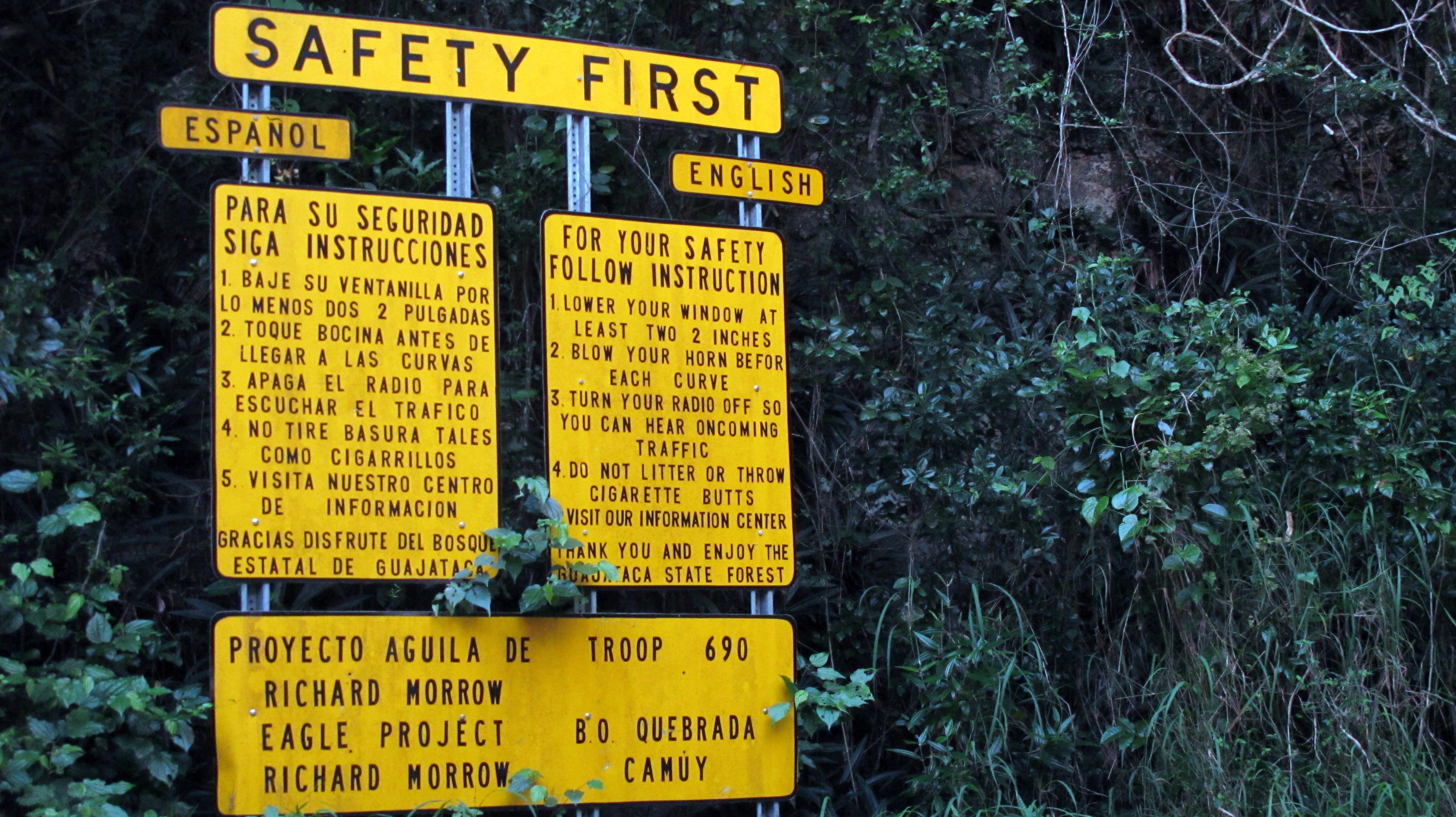
"For your safety" driving in Puerto Rico sign

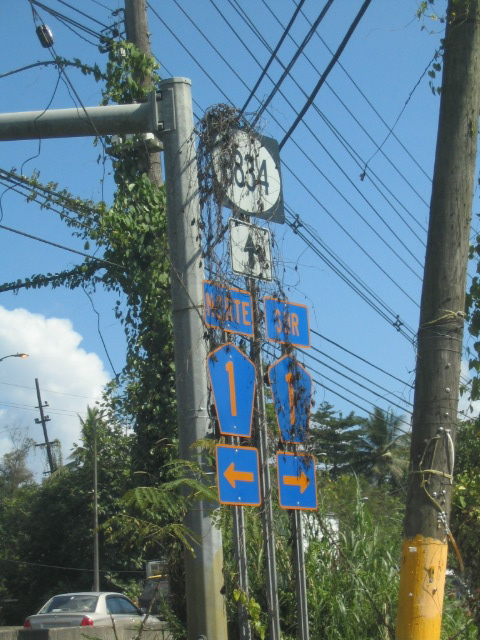
PR-1 and PR-8834 in Guaynabo, Puerto Rico

Tertiary highways also follow a general grid. Towns which do not border the Atlantic Ocean or the Caribbean Sea, especially in the mountainous area, may overlap this grid, for example Ciales may have both highways in the 600-699 grid and the 500-599 grid, depending where they begin further north or further south. Generally along the areas where the highways are, the lower the number, the more south it is. Culebra is the only town in Puerto Rico that does not fall in any of the regions, for only PR-250 and PR-251 are the main routes. The entire immediate metropolitan area of San Juan with the exception of Caguas falls in the 800 region, while the entire east coast (north and south) east of San Juan, Caguas and Patillas fall in the 900 region. This is because the eastern portion of Puerto Rico has a southeastern coast which goes to the west from Humacao, which roughly defines where the Vieques Passage and the Caribbean Sea meet along the coast. Yabucoa is in the exact south-southeast area and lies in the 900 region, while Maunabo overlaps the 700's and 900's regions. Vieques, an offshore island-municipality, has some highways in the 900 order.

Some roads are numbered using four digits. For example, PR-5506. These are branches, or spurs, of tertiary roads by the same last three digit number. Thus, PR-5506 is a branch of PR-506. They are often dead end branches, and are common in the mountain regions of the main island. Sometimes they are loops branching off the main road and eventually connecting back to the same main tertiary road. The “fourth” digit is generally a repeat of the first digit of the main tertiary road in question. Thus, a branch of PR-301 would be signed PR-3301, with the added 3 prefixing the number of the main tertiary road associated with the spur, 301, because 3 is the first digit of the main road. When the road has more than one distinct spur, an additional unrelated digit is used (example, PR-4301).

Number	Length (mi)	Length (km)	Southern or western terminus	Northern or eastern terminus	Formed	Removed	Notes
PR-301	7.1	11.4	Los Morrillos Light in Cabo Rojo	PR-101 in Cabo Rojo	—	—	
PR-303	9.1	14.6	PR-301 in Cabo Rojo	PR-101 in Lajas	—	—	
PR-326	2.7	4.3	PR-116 in Guánica	PR-121 in Yauco	2015	current	Formerly PR-1116
PR-339	3.1	5.0	PR-105 in Mayagüez	PR-119 in Mayagüez	—	—	Part of the Ruta Panorámica
PR-344	4.0	6.4	PR-345 in Hormigueros	PR-348 in Mayagüez	1953	current	
PR-365	—	—	PR-368 in Sabana Grande	PR-105 in Maricao	—	—	Part of the Ruta Panorámica
PR-366	—	—	PR-120 in Sabana Grande	PR-365 in Maricao	—	—	Part of the Ruta Panorámica
PR-385	3.29	5.29	PR-127 in Peñuelas	PR-132 in Peñuelas	1953	current	
PR-413	3.8	6.1	PR-115 in Rincón	PR-115 in Rincón	—	—	
PR-435	—	—	PR-119 in San Sebastián	PR-124 in Lares	—	—	
PR-438	1.1	1.8	PR-111 in San Sebastián	Barrio Juncal in San Sebastián	—	—	
PR-453	—	—	PR-1111 in Lares	PR-119 in Quebradillas	1953	current	
PR-462	1.50	2.41	PR-2 / PR-463 in Aguadilla	PR-110 in Moca	—	—	
PR-467	—	—	PR-107 in Aguadilla	PR-459 in Aguadilla	—	—	
PR-487	5.4	8.7	PR-129 in Hatillo	PR-130 / PR-488 in Hatillo	1953	current	
PR-500	1.8	2.9	Sector La Cotorra in Ponce	PR-132 in Ponce	—	—	
PR-501	6.4	10.3	PR-123 in Ponce	PR-123 in Ponce	—	—	
PR-502	3.2	5.1	PR-132 in Ponce	PR-501 in Ponce	—	—	
PR-503	10.6	17.1	Calle Salsa in Ponce	PR-143 in Utuado	—	—	
PR-504	4.3	6.9	PR-10 / PR-503 in Ponce	PR-505 in Ponce	—	—	
PR-505	10.2	16.4	PR-139 in Ponce	PR-503 in Ponce	—	—	
PR-506	1.2	1.9	Urbanización Hacienda Juliana in Ponce	PR-14 in Ponce	—	—	
PR-507	—	—	Sector Buyones in Ponce	PR-1 in Ponce	—	—	
PR-510	6.4	10.3	PR-1 in Ponce	PR-14 in Juana Díaz	—	—	
PR-511	11.7	18.8	PR-14 in Ponce	PR-143 in Ponce	—	—	
PR-515	0.93	1.50	PR-123 in Ponce	PR-10 in Ponce	—	—	
PR-516	1.9	3.1	Sector Santas Pascuas in Ponce	PR-123 in Ponce	—	—	
PR-518	7.5	12.1	PR-131 in Adjuntas	PR-123 in Adjuntas	1953	current	Part of the Ruta Panorámica
PR-520	—	—	PR-391 in Peñuelas	PR-502 in Ponce	—	—	
PR-525	3.6	5.8	PR-135 in Adjuntas	PR-131 in Adjuntas	1953	current	Part of the Ruta Panorámica
PR-536	—	—	PR-1 / PR-537 in Santa Isabel	PR-14 in Juana Díaz	1953	current	
PR-538	1.1	1.8	Calle Vista Mar in Santa Isabel	PR-1 in Santa Isabel	1953	current	
PR-549	2.1	3.4	Sector Ranchete in Ponce	PR-132 in Ponce	—	—	
PR-567	10.1	16.3	PR-157 in Orocovis	PR-145 / PR-6622 in Morovis	1953	current	
PR-568	18.7	30.1	PR-5155 in Orocovis	PR-159 in Corozal	1953	current	
PR-577	0.12	0.19	PR-143 in Ponce	Cerro Maravilla in Ponce	—	—	
PR-578	0.50	0.80	PR-1 in Ponce	Calle Húcar in Ponce	—	—	
PR-581	—	—	Sector Tiburones in Ponce	PR-1 in Ponce	—	—	
PR-585	1.7	2.7	PR-123 in Ponce	PR-2R in Ponce	—	—	
PR-588	1.1	1.8	PR-504 in Ponce	Camino La Zarza in Ponce	—	—	Spur of PR-504
PR-591	1.9	3.1	PR-2 in Ponce	PR-2 in Ponce	—	—	
PR-617	—	—	PR-155 / PR-618 in Morovis	PR-155 / PR-159 in Morovis	1953	current	
PR-633	2.7	4.3	PR-149 in Ciales	PR-155 in Morovis	1953	current	
PR-642	—	—	PR-140 in Florida	PR-6685 in Manatí	1953	current	
PR-647	8.0	12.9	PR-159 / PR-5568 in Corozal	PR-676 in Vega Alta	1953	current	
PR-679	1.7	2.7	PR-677 / PR-823 in Dorado	PR-2 in Dorado	1953	current	
PR-690	4.7	7.6	PR-676 in Vega Alta	Calle Principal in Vega Alta	1953	current	
PR-693	9.6	15.4	PR-2 / PR-165 in Dorado	PR-690 in Vega Alta	1953	current	
PR-715	3.5	5.6	Sector Cercadillo in Cayey	PR-1 in Cayey	1953	current	Part of the Ruta Panorámica
PR-722	4.8	7.7	PR-162 / PR-7718 in Aibonito	PR-14 in Aibonito	1953	current	Part of the Ruta Panorámica
PR-723	6.0	9.7	PR-143 in Coamo	PR-14 in Aibonito	1953	current	Ruta Panorámica
PR-735	1.7	2.7	PR-1 in Cayey	PR-1 in Cayey	1953	current	Part of the Carretera Central
PR-741	—	—	PR-15 in Cayey	Barrio Culebras Alto in Cayey	1953	current	Part of the Ruta Panorámica
PR-742	—	—	PR-179 in Guayama	PR-738 in Cayey	—	—	Part of the Ruta Panorámica
PR-744	1.7	2.7	Sector Central Machete in Guayama	PR-3 in Guayama	—	—	
PR-760	2.4	3.9	PR-3 in Maunabo	Punta Tuna Light in Maunabo	1953	current	Part of the Ruta Panorámica
PR-784	—	—	PR-172 in Caguas	PR-34 in Caguas	—	—	
PR-798	2.9	4.7	PR-1 in Caguas	PR-1 in San Juan	—	—	Part of the Carretera Central
PR-802	4.1	6.6	PR-801 in Corozal	PR-152 / PR-803 in Naranjito	1953	current	
PR-803	6.3	10.1	PR-152 / PR-802 in Naranjito	PR-164 in Corozal	—	—	
PR-805	4.5	7.2	PR-568 in Corozal	PR-803 in Corozal	—	—	
PR-806	—	—	PR-159 in Corozal	PR-823 in Toa Alta	—	—	
PR-807	4.3	6.9	PR-805 in Corozal	Calle San Manuel in Corozal	—	—	
PR-808	—	—	PR-803 in Corozal	PR-811 in Naranjito	—	—	
PR-810	2.3	3.7	PR-152 in Naranjito	PR-164 in Naranjito	—	—	Formerly PR-152
PR-811	—	—	PR-152 in Naranjito	PR-164 in Naranjito	—	—	
PR-818	2.7	4.3	Sector Baja del Palo in Corozal	PR-159 in Corozal	1953	current	
PR-819	2.6	4.2	PR-861 in Toa Alta	PR-863 in Toa Baja	—	—	
PR-820	—	—	PR-677 / PR-678 in Vega Alta	PR-823 in Toa Alta	1953	current	
PR-821	3.7	6.0	PR-891 in Corozal	PR-630 in Corozal	1953	current	
PR-823	4.5	7.2	PR-677 / PR-679 in Dorado	PR-165 in Toa Alta	—	—	
PR-862	2.2	3.5	PR-861 in Bayamón	PR-864 in Bayamón	—	—	
PR-863	1.6	2.6	PR-2 in Toa Baja	PR-862 in Toa Baja	—	—	
PR-864	1.3	2.1	PR-2 in Bayamón	PR-2 in Bayamón	—	—	
PR-866	4.8	7.7	PR-2 in Toa Baja	PR-167 in Toa Baja	—	—	
PR-869	2.9	4.7	PR-5 in Cataño	PR-165 in Cataño	—	—	
PR-870	1.3	2.1	PR-165 in Toa Baja	Isla de Cabras in Toa Baja	—	—	
PR-873	1.1	1.8	PR-1 in San Juan	PR-1 in San Juan	—	—	Part of the Carretera Central
PR-888	2.2	3.5	PR-165 in Cataño	PR-5 in Cataño	—	—	
PR-891	1.1	1.8	PR-159 in Corozal	PR-159 in Corozal	—	—	Formerly PR-159
PR-901	9.4	15.1	PR-760 in Maunabo	PR-9910 in Yabucoa	1953	current	Part of the Ruta Panorámica
PR-906	—	—	PR-3 in Yabucoa	PR-3 in Humacao	1953	current	
PR-908	8.4	13.5	PR-3 in Yabucoa	PR-3 in Humacao	1953	current	
PR-939	1.8	2.9	PR-760 in Maunabo	Sector Quebrada Arenas in Maunabo	—	—	Part of the Ruta Panorámica
PR-943	—	—	PR-189 in Gurabo	PR-181 in Gurabo	1953	current	
PR-955	3.8	6.1	PR-3 in Río Grande	PR-3 / PR-968 in Río Grande	—	—	
PR-983	—	—	PR-988 in Luquillo	PR-940 in Luquillo	—	—	
PR-996	1.3	2.1	PR-201 in Vieques	PR-201 in Vieques	—	—	
PR-998	—	—	Port of Culebra	Zoni Beach in Culebra	—	—	Renumbered to PR-250
PR-999	—	—	PR-250 in Culebra	Flamenco Beach in Culebra	—	—	Renumbered to PR-251
PR-1107	3.9	6.3	PR-2 / PR-111 in Aguadilla	PR-107 in Aguadilla	—	—	Formerly PR-111
PR-1111	2.8	4.5	PR-111 in Lares	Barrio Lares in Lares	—	—	Formerly PR-111; Lares business loop
PR-1116	—	—	PR-116 in Guánica	PR-121 in Yauco	—	—	Formerly PR-116R; renumbered to PR-326
PR-1150	—	—	PR-5520 in Villalba	PR-150 in Coamo	—	—	
PR-1181	—	—	PR-3 in Patillas	PR-3 in Patillas	—	—	
PR-3101	0.93	1.50	Calle San Blas in Lajas	PR-101 in Lajas	—	—	
PR-3108	0.93	1.50	PR-2 in Mayagüez	PR-108 in Mayagüez	—	—	
PR-3116	2.1	3.4	PR-116 in Guánica	PR-116 in Guánica	—	—	Formerly PR-116
PR-3131	3.3	5.3	PR-132 in Guayanilla	Sector Malpaso in Peñuelas	—	—	
PR-3132	1.4	2.3	PR-132 in Peñuelas	PR-132 in Peñuelas	—	—	Exists in two segments as the section between PR-3384 and PR-132 is under construction.
PR-3301	1.8	2.9	Calle Mariana Bracetti in Cabo Rojo	PR-301 in Cabo Rojo	—	—	
PR-3342	0.68	1.09	PR-102 in Mayagüez	PR-64 / PR-102 in Mayagüez	—	—	Calle Concordia
PR-3344	0.81	1.30	PR-309 in Hormigueros	PR-344 in Hormigueros	—	—	Hormigueros spur
PR-4010	0.87	1.40	PR-110 in Aguadilla	Ramey Air Force Base in Aguadilla	—	—	Formerly PR-110R
PR-4025	0.93	1.50	PR-110 in Moca	PR-110 in Moca	—	—	Formerly PR-110R
PR-4110	0.56	0.90	PR-443 in Aguadilla	PR-110 in Moca	—	—	
PR-4111	0.56	0.90	PR-111 in San Sebastián	PR-111 in San Sebastián	—	—	Formerly PR-111
PR-4116	0.93	1.50	PR-116 in Guánica	PR-333 in Guánica	—	—	Formerly PR-116R; Guánica business route
PR-4119	4.5	7.2	PR-485 in Quebradillas	PR-119 in Camuy	—	—	Formerly PR-485
PR-4128	0.75	1.21	PR-111 in Lares	PR-128 / PR-1111 in Lares	—	—	
PR-4413	0.62	1.00	PR-413 in Rincón	Domes Beach in Rincón	—	—	
PR-4415	0.75	1.21	PR-417 in Aguada	PR-115 in Aguada	—	—	Formerly PR-115R
PR-4435	—	—	Quebrada Las Cañas in San Sebastián	PR-435 in San Sebastián	—	—	
PR-4440	—	—	Parque de Colón in Aguada	PR-1107 in Aguadilla	—	—	
PR-5139	1.7	2.7	PR-14 in Ponce	PR-139 / PR-139R in Ponce	—	—	
PR-5141	1.3	2.1	PR-144 in Jayuya	PR-141 in Jayuya	—	—	Jayuya northwest bypass
PR-5144	0.47	0.76	PR-144 in Jayuya	PR-141 in Jayuya	—	—	Jayuya east bypass
PR-5155	0.81	1.30	PR-155 in Orocovis	PR-155 in Orocovis	—	—	Formerly PR-155; Orocovis business route
PR-5156	0.16	0.26	PR-155 in Orocovis	PR-156 in Orocovis	—	—	
PR-5506	0.87	1.40	PR-1 in Ponce	PR-10 in Ponce	—	—	
PR-5510	0.87	1.40	PR-1 in Ponce	PR-510 in Juana Díaz	—	—	
PR-5525	0.68	1.09	Barrio Limaní in Adjuntas	PR-525 in Adjuntas	—	—	
PR-5538	1.2	1.9	PR-538 in Santa Isabel	PR-1 / PR-5507 in Santa Isabel	—	—	
PR-5549	—	—	Barrio Canas Urbano in Ponce	PR-2 / PR-2R in Ponce	—	—	
PR-5561	—	—	PR-149 in Villalba	PR-150 in Villalba	—	—	
PR-5567	1.7	2.7	PR-567 in Morovis	Barrio Vaga in Morovis	—	—	
PR-5568	2.7	4.3	PR-568 in Corozal	PR-159 / PR-647 in Corozal	—	—	
PR-6111	1.7	2.7	PR-123 in Utuado	PR-111 in Utuado	—	—	Formerly PR-111R; Utuado business loop
PR-6140	—	—	PR-2 in Barceloneta	PR-140 in Barceloneta	—	—	Formerly PR-140
PR-6165	0.50	0.80	PR-693 in Dorado	PR-165 in Dorado	—	—	Dorado business route
PR-6633	0.14	0.23	PR-6685 in Ciales	PR-149 in Ciales	—	—	
PR-6642	—	—	PR-642 in Florida	PR-140 in Florida	—	—	
PR-6685	7.4	11.9	PR-146 in Ciales	PR-2 in Manatí	—	—	Formerly PR-149
PR-6690	1.7	2.7	PR-693 in Vega Alta	PR-690 in Vega Alta	—	—	
PR-6693	0.81	1.30	PR-696 in Dorado	PR-693 in Dorado	—	—	Dorado southern bypass
PR-7014	—	—	PR-14 in Cayey	Calle Enramada in Cayey	—	—	
PR-7156	1.7	2.7	PR-156 in Aguas Buenas	PR-156 in Caguas	—	—	Formerly PR-156
PR-7167	—	—	PR-156 / PR-167 in Comerío	La Plata River in Comerío	—	—	Formerly PR-156
PR-7173	0.81	1.30	Sector Las Corujas in Aguas Buenas	PR-173 in Aguas Buenas	—	—	
PR-7707	—	—	PR-3 in Guayama	PR-53 in Guayama	—	—	
PR-7718	—	—	PR-14 in Aibonito	PR-162 / PR-722 in Aibonito	—	—	Part of the Ruta Panorámica
PR-7722	3.9	6.3	PR-722 in Aibonito	PR-1 in Cayey	—	—	Part of the Ruta Panorámica
PR-7737	—	—	PR-715 in Cayey	PR-15 in Cayey	—	—	Part of the Ruta Panorámica
PR-7740	—	—	PR-184 in Patillas	PR-181 in San Lorenzo	—	—	Part of the Ruta Panorámica
PR-7741	—	—	PR-741 in Cayey	PR-742 in Guayama	—	—	Ruta Panorámica
PR-7760	1.2	1.9	PR-760 in Maunabo	PR-901 in Maunabo	—	—	
PR-8176	0.87	1.40	PR-176 in San Juan	PR-176 in San Juan	—	—	
PR-8177	0.50	0.80	PR-177 in Guaynabo	PR-841 in Guaynabo	—	—	
PR-8811	—	—	PR-164 in Naranjito	Sector Cuchillas Pacheco in Naranjito	—	—	
PR-8834	—	—	PR-1 / PR-173 in Guaynabo	PR-1 / PR-169 in Guaynabo	—	—	Part of the Carretera Central
PR-8838	—	—	PR-177 in San Juan	PR-1 in San Juan	—	—	Part of the Carretera Central
PR-8865	—	—	PR-165 in Dorado	PR-2 in Toa Baja	—	—	
PR-8869	1.6	2.6	PR-869 in Cataño	PR-5 in Cataño	—	—	
PR-9030	—	—	PR-189 in Gurabo	PR-933 in Gurabo	—	—	
PR-9185	1.6	2.6	PR-185 in Juncos	PR-31 in Juncos	—	—	
PR-9188	0.68	1.09	PR-66 in Canóvanas	PR-3 / PR-188 in Canóvanas	—	—	
PR-9189	0.87	1.40	PR-189 in Gurabo	Sector Preciosa in Gurabo	—	—	
PR-9918	—	—	PR-182 in Yabucoa	PR-920 in Yabucoa	—	—	
PR-9974	—	—	PR-973 / PR-9973 in Naguabo	PR-978 in Ceiba	—	—	
Former

== Interstates ==
Map of Puerto Rico's Interstate Highways

There are no Interstate-signed highways in Puerto Rico, but there are roadways that have received up to 90% of their funding from the US Interstate Highway System. Still, at least as of 2007, none of such highways funded by the Interstate Highway program were planned or built to the standards of the Interstate Highway System. As of March 2001, Puerto Rico had 410 km (250 mi) of such roadways. As of 2001, there were three highways in Puerto Rico funded under the Interstate Highway Program. These routes—such as with Interstate Highways in Alaska and Interstate Highways in Hawaii—do not connect to the Interstate Highway System in the contiguous United States.

Like Interstate routes in Alaska, Puerto Rico Interstate routes are unsigned. For administrative and funding purposes, the three routes have been designated as PRI-1, PRI-2 and PRI-3 and run along various combinations of Puerto Rico routes. They do not follow the even-and-odd-number rule used in mainland United States that indicates direction of travel. Per Section 103(c)(1)(B) (ii), Title 23, United States Code (23 U.S.C.) Puerto Rico is exempt from the design standards of Section 109(b).

Puerto Rico's Interstate routes should not be confused with Puerto Rico Routes PR-1, PR-2, and PR-3, which are other major highways in Puerto Rico.

Route	Component routes	Length mi	Length km	From	To
PR-1	PR-52; PR-18	71.08	114.39	PR-2 in Ponce	PR-22 in San Juan (PR-22/PR-18 interchange)
PR-2	PR-2; PR-22	138.13	222.30	PR-1 in Ponce	PR-18 in San Juan (PR-22/PR-18 interchange)
PR-3	PR-53; PR-3; PR-26; PR-22	55.16	88.77	PR-30 in Humacao	PR-18 in San Juan (PR-22/PR-18 interchange)

== See also ==
- List of toll roads in the United States § Puerto Rico
- List of highways in Ponce, Puerto Rico
- 1953 Puerto Rico highway renumbering
