= Puerto Rico Highway 47 =

Highway in Puerto Rico

Highway 47
- Ruta 47
- Calle De Diego

Route information
- Maintained by Puerto Rico DTPW
- Length: 2.8 km (1.7 mi)

Major junctions
- West end: Calle Ferrocarril / Paseo De Diego in Pueblo
- PR-27 in Pueblo; PR-899 in Sabana Llana Sur–Oriente; PR-181 in Oriente–Sabana Llana Sur
- East end: PR-3 in Sabana Llana Sur

Location
- Country: United States
- Territory: Puerto Rico
- Municipalities: San Juan

Highway system
- Roads in Puerto Rico; List
← PR-42	→ PR-52

Puerto Rico Highway 47 (PR-47), also known as Calle De Diego, is an urban road in Río Piedras, Puerto Rico. This road extends from PR-3 to downtown Río Piedras.

== Route description ==
PR-47 begins at PR-3 (Avenida 65 de Infantería) and ends at downtown Río Piedras, in the Paseo De Diego, a commercial street in downtown Río Piedras. Among its intersections are the PR-181 (Expreso Trujillo Alto) and PR-27 (Avenida José C. Barbosa).

== Major intersections ==
The entire route is located in San Juan.

Location	km	mi	Destinations	Notes
Pueblo	0.0	0.0	PR-Calle Ferrocarril / PR-Paseo De Diego – Río Piedras	Western terminus of PR-47
Pueblo	0.7	0.43	PR-27 (Avenida José Celso Barbosa) – San Juan	
Sabana Llana Sur–Oriente line	1.6	0.99	PR-899 (Avenida Ramón B. López) – Río Piedras	
Sabana Llana Sur–Oriente line	2.0	1.2	PR-181 (Expreso Manuel Rivera Morales) – San Juan, Trujillo Alto	
Sabana Llana Sur	2.8	1.7	PR-3 (Avenida 65 de Infantería) – Carolina, Río Piedras	Eastern terminus of PR-47
1.000 mi = 1.609 km; 1.000 km = 0.621 mi

== See also ==
- José de Diego
