= Avenida Juan Ponce de León =

Highway in San Juan, Puerto Rico

Highway 25
- Ruta 25
- Avenida Juan Ponce de León
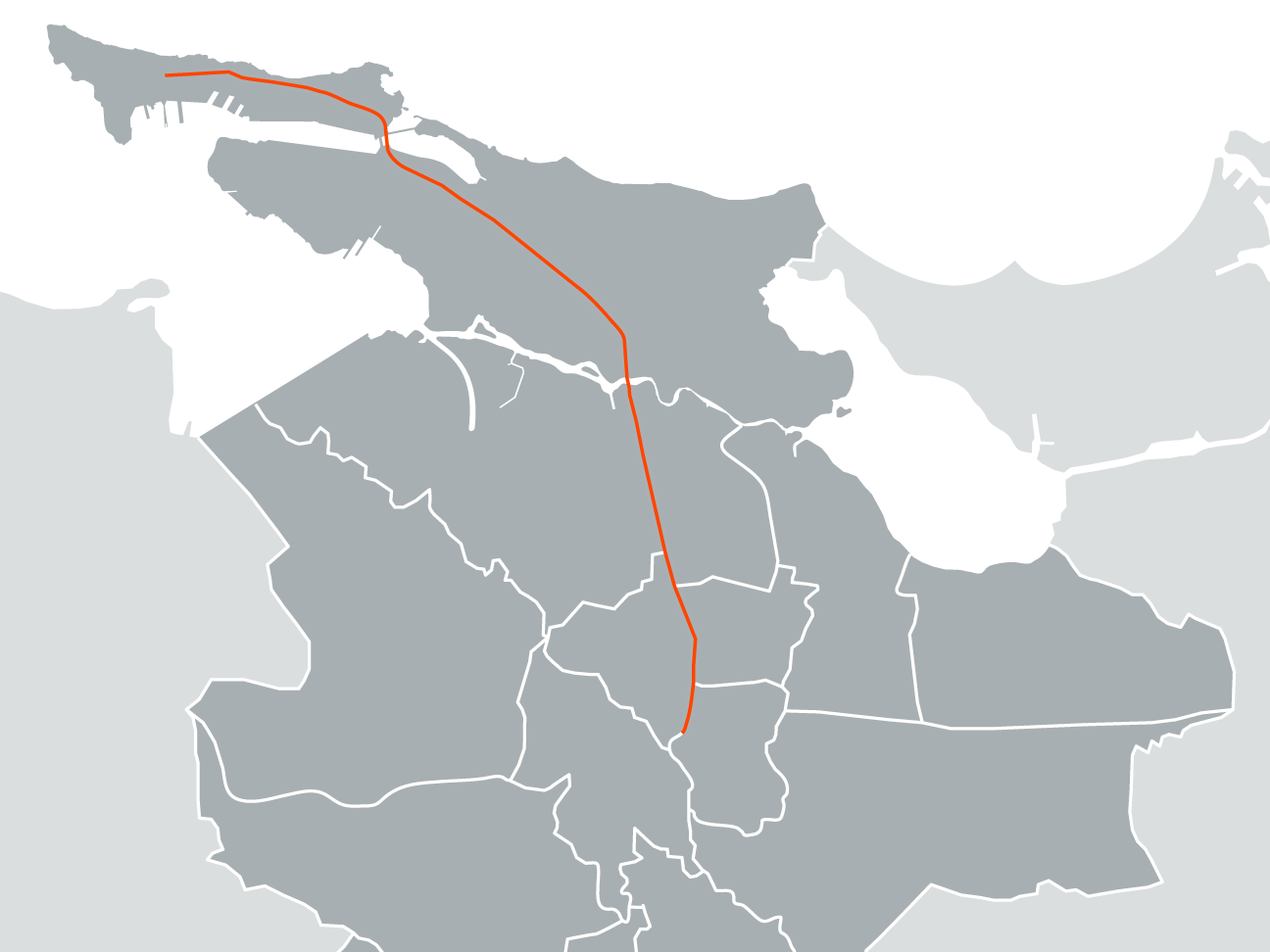

Route information
- Maintained by Puerto Rico DTPW
- Length: 11.1 km (6.9 mi)

Major junctions
- South end: PR-3 in Pueblo–Hato Rey Sur
- PR-17 in Universidad–Hato Rey Sur; PR-41 in Hato Rey Central–Hato Rey Norte; PR-23 in Hato Rey Central–Hato Rey Norte; PR-36 in Santurce; PR-37 Santurce; PR-22 in Santurce; PR-2 in Santurce; PR-39 in Santurce; PR-1 / PR-16 / PR-26 in Santurce; PR-1 / PR-25P in San Juan Antiguo
- North end: Calle Fortaleza / Calle Recinto Sur in San Juan Antiguo

Location
- Country: United States
- Territory: Puerto Rico
- Municipalities: San Juan

Highway system
- Roads in Puerto Rico; List
← PR-24	→ PR-26
← PR-14R	PR-25R	→ PR-110R

Avenida Juan Ponce de León (Juan Ponce de León Avenue), also known as Avenida de la Constitución (Constitution Avenue), and coextensive as Puerto Rico Highway 25 (PR-25) along its entire length, is one of the main thoroughfares in San Juan, the capital municipality of Puerto Rico. Named after Juan Ponce de León, the Spanish conquistador who led the European colonization of the archipelago in 1508 after its discovery by Christopher Columbus during his second voyage in 1493, it connects the historic quarter of Old San Juan in San Juan Islet with the residential and resort barrio of Santurce, the business center of Hato Rey, and the commercial and residential district of Río Piedras in the main island. It is one of the oldest roadways in Puerto Rico, as some sections are dated to at least 1519.

== Route description ==
It is a mostly three-lane, one-way road. It runs from Old San Juan to Río Piedras pueblo and, for most of its length, it is a three- or four-lane road traversing the Isleta de San Juan corridor. The section running through Río Piedras pueblo is the only section that is not a multi-lane roadway.

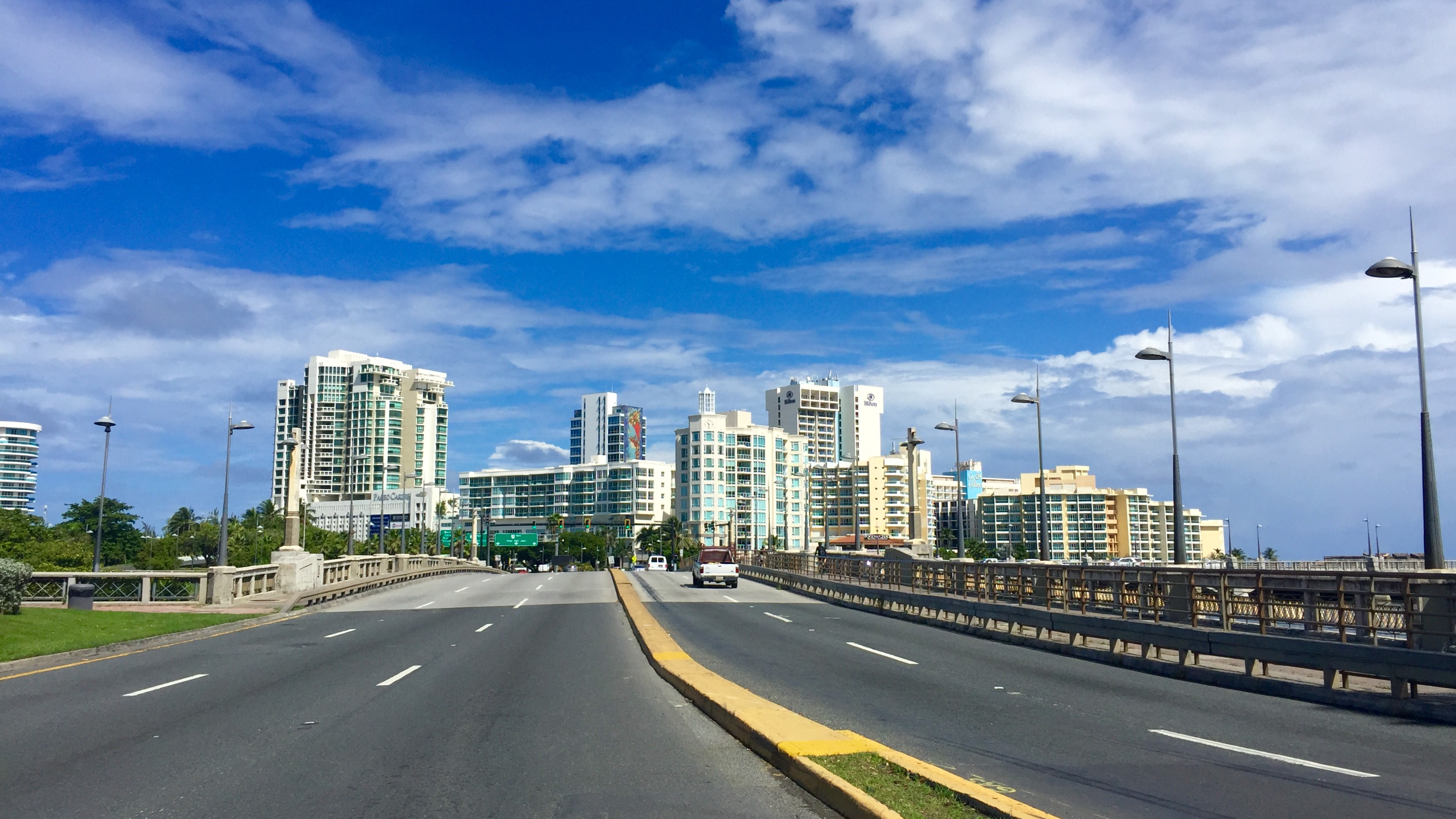
The road as it crosses over the Guillermo Esteves Bridge

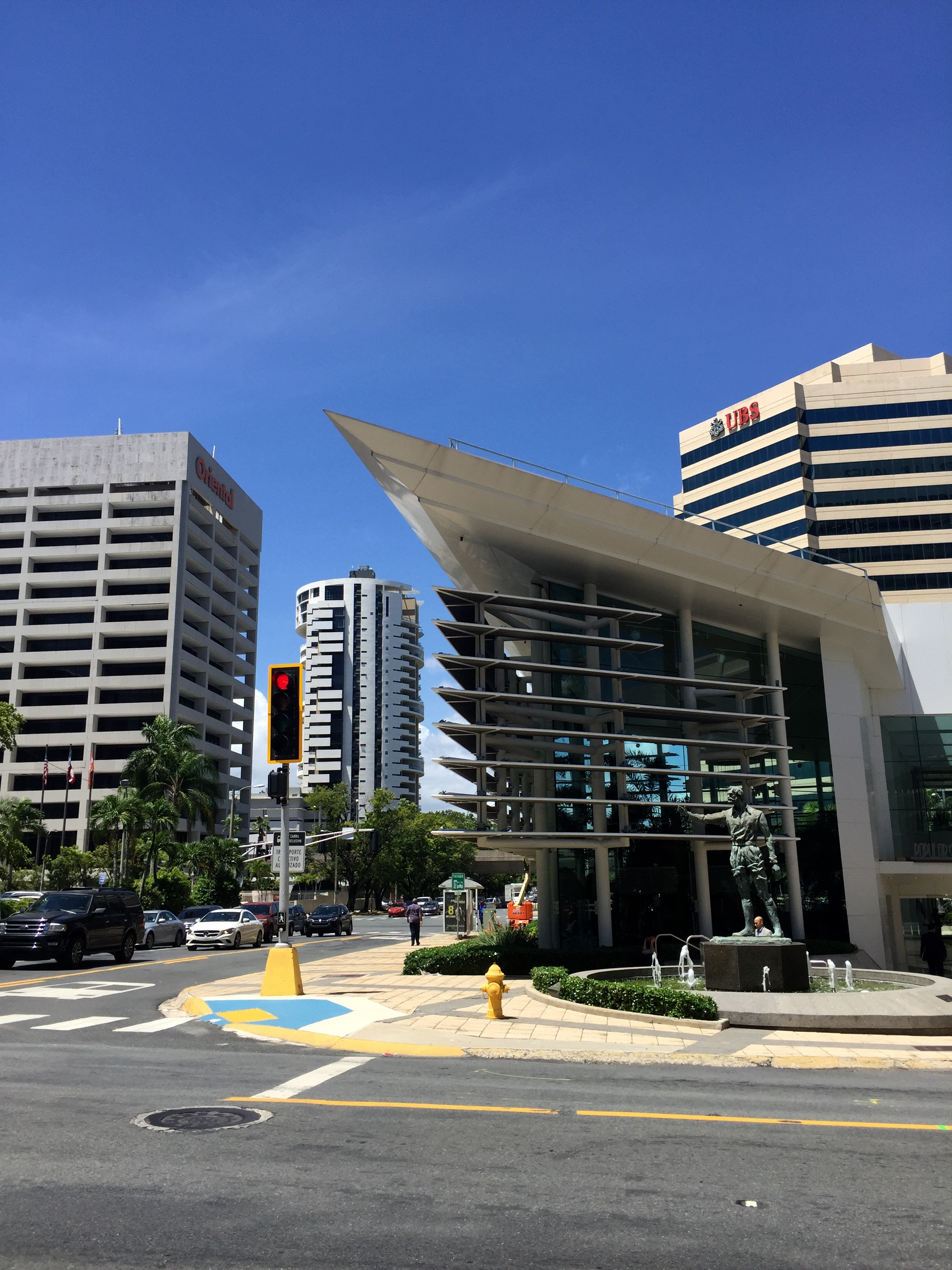
Golden Mile in Hato Rey

=== Urban landscape ===
Institutional, cultural and other notable buildings predominate the thoroughfare, and it is an attraction for its architecture.

A stretch of Avenida Ponce de León has been designated as part of the arts district. It starts in Miramar and continues towards Hato Rey for 4 miles.

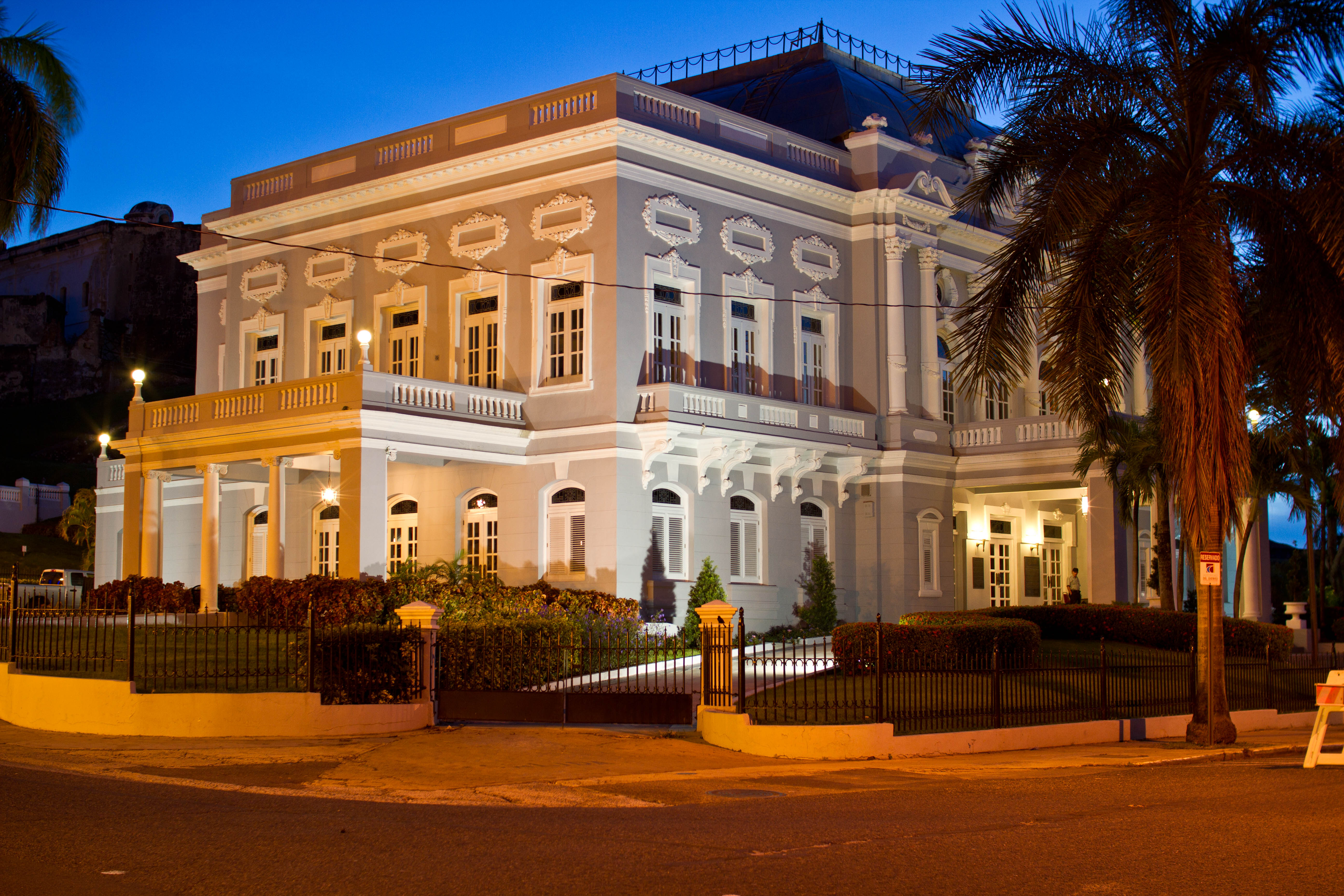
Casino de Puerto Rico,
1 Avenida Juan Ponce de León

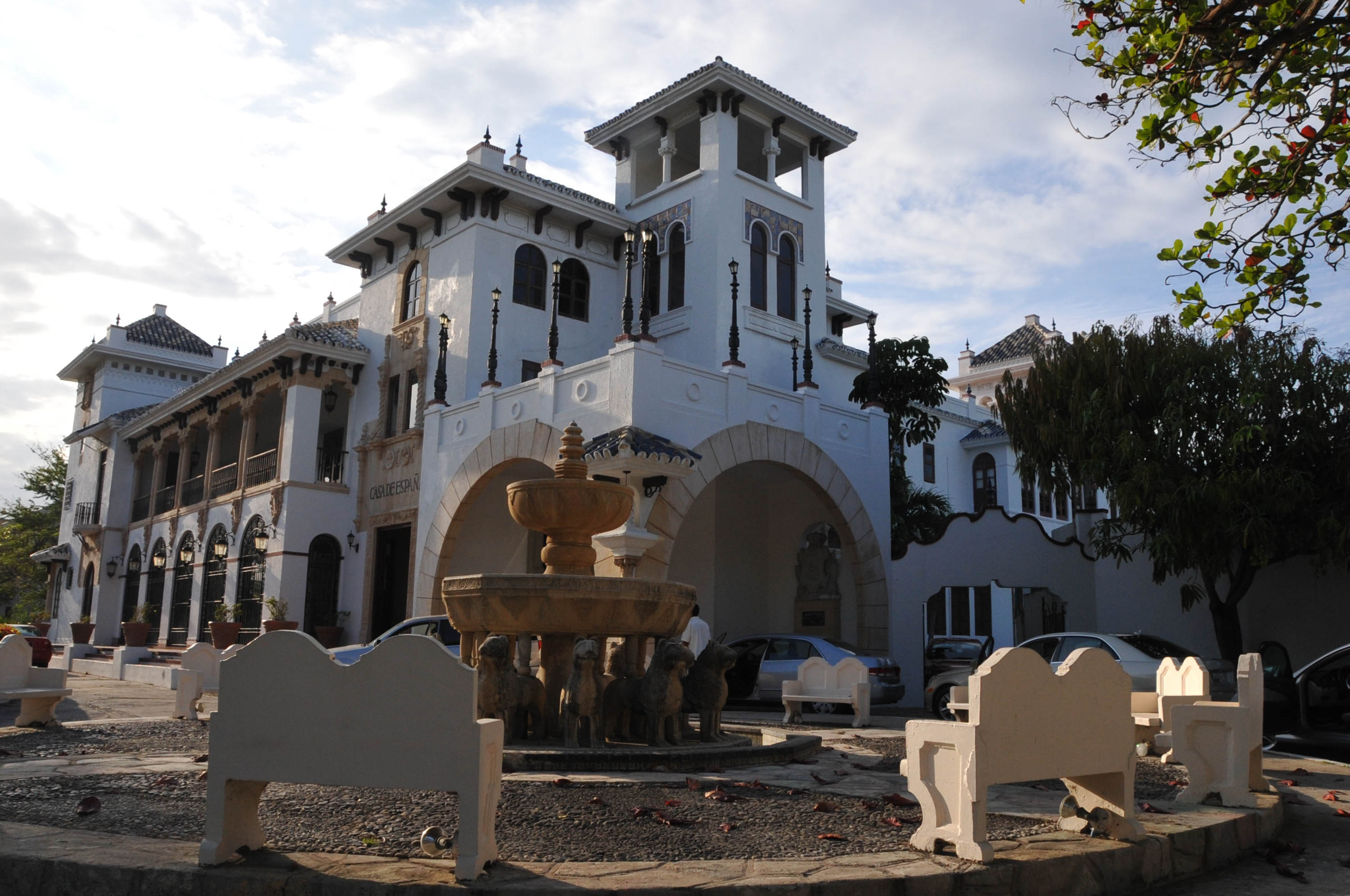
Casa de España, Puerta de Tierra

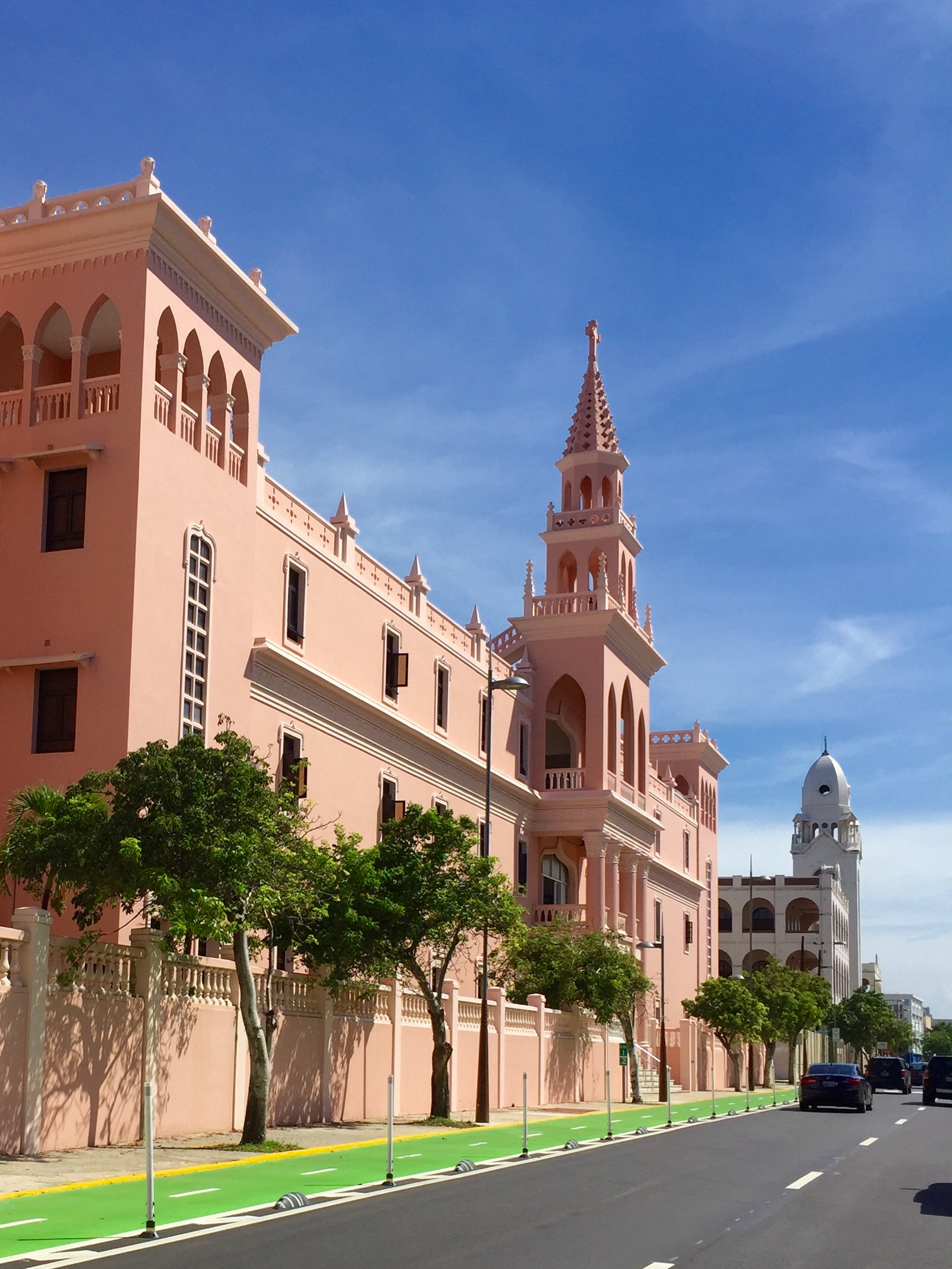
Nuestra Señora de la Providencia

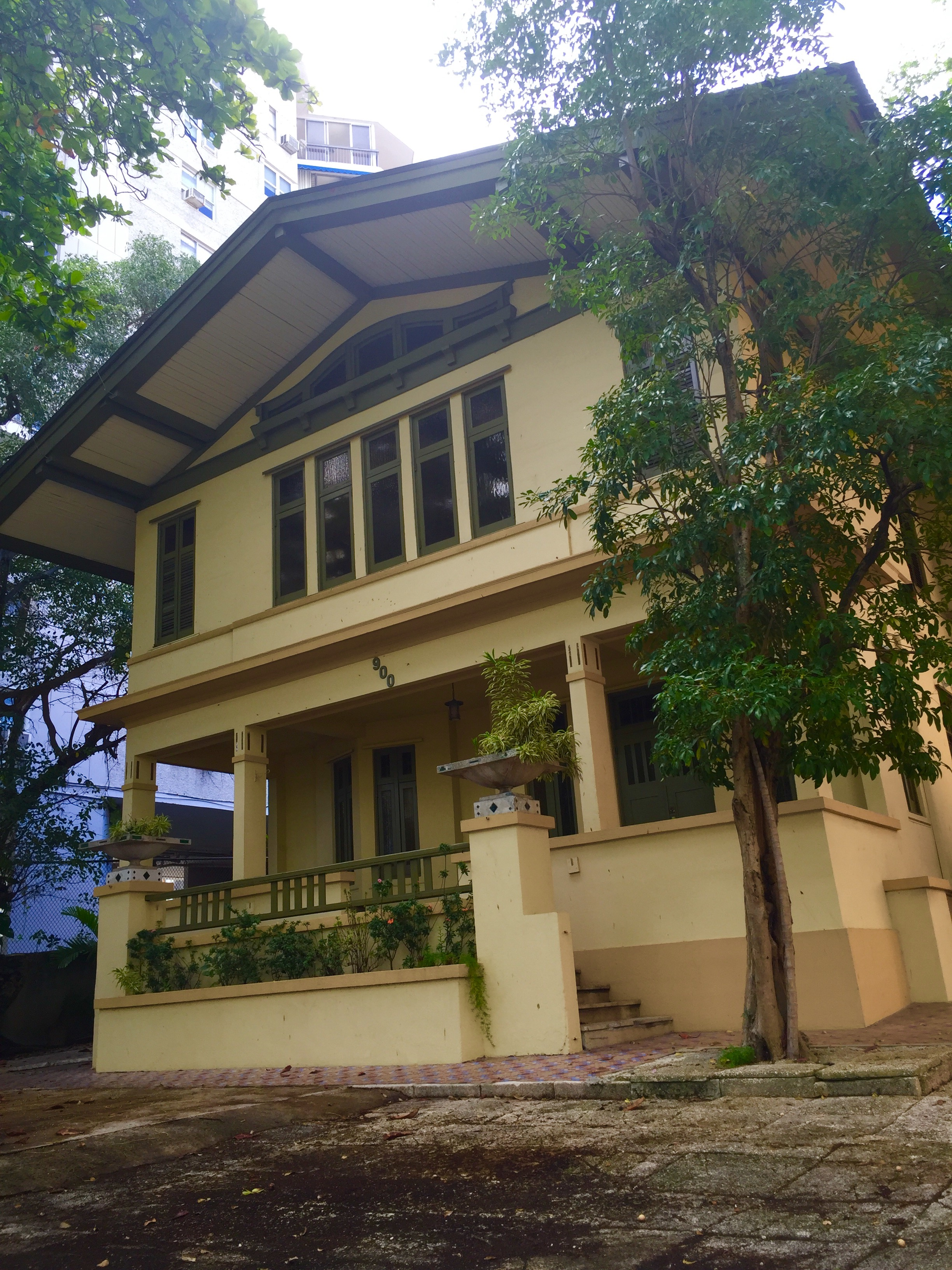
Casa Aboy, Miramar

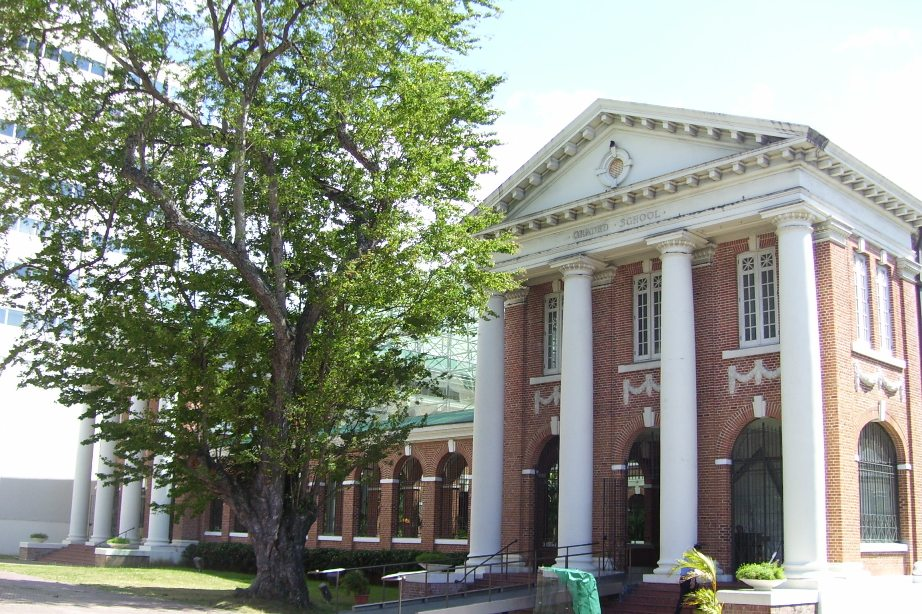
Museum of Contemporary Art, Santurce

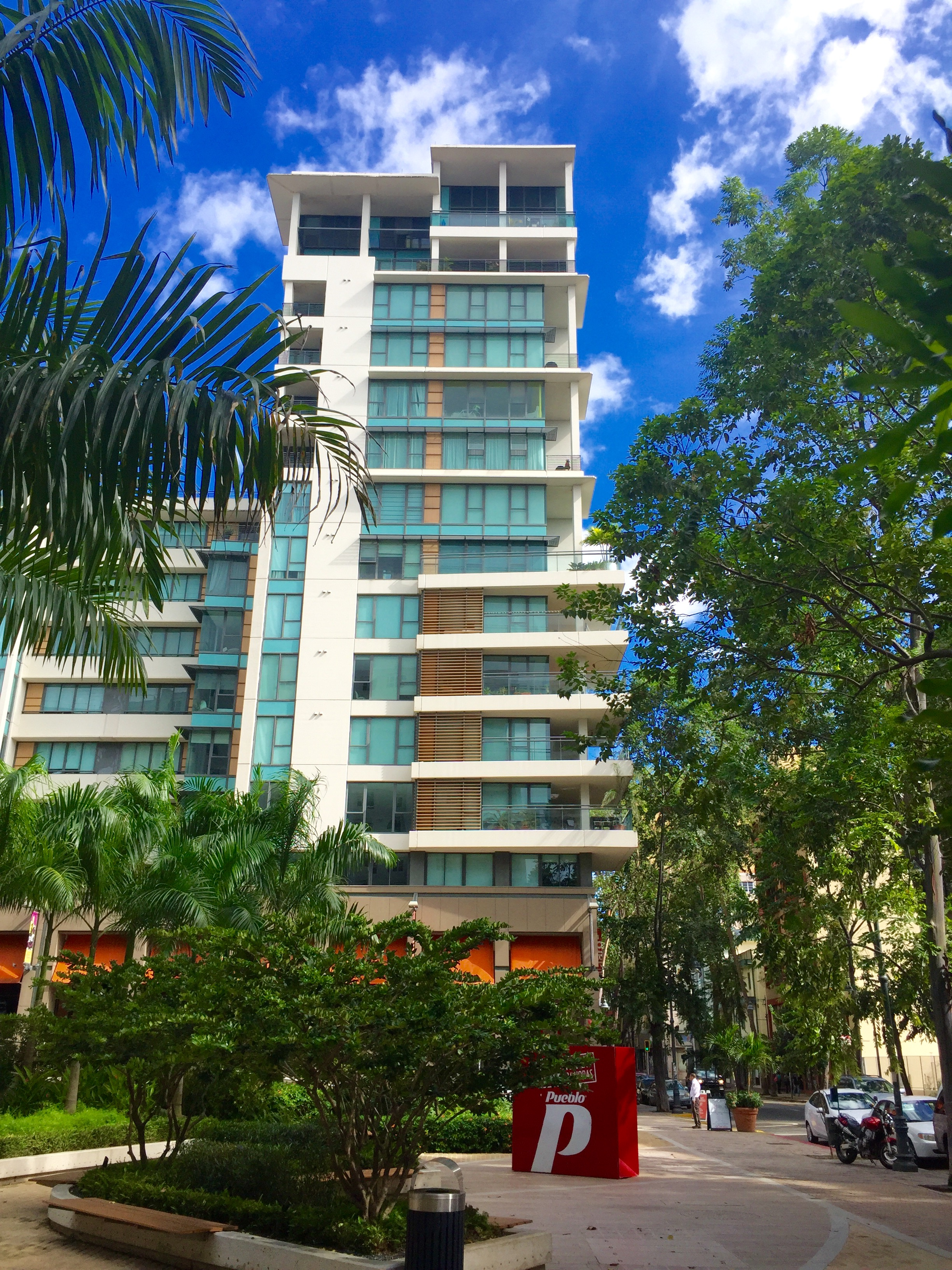
Ciudadela in Santurce

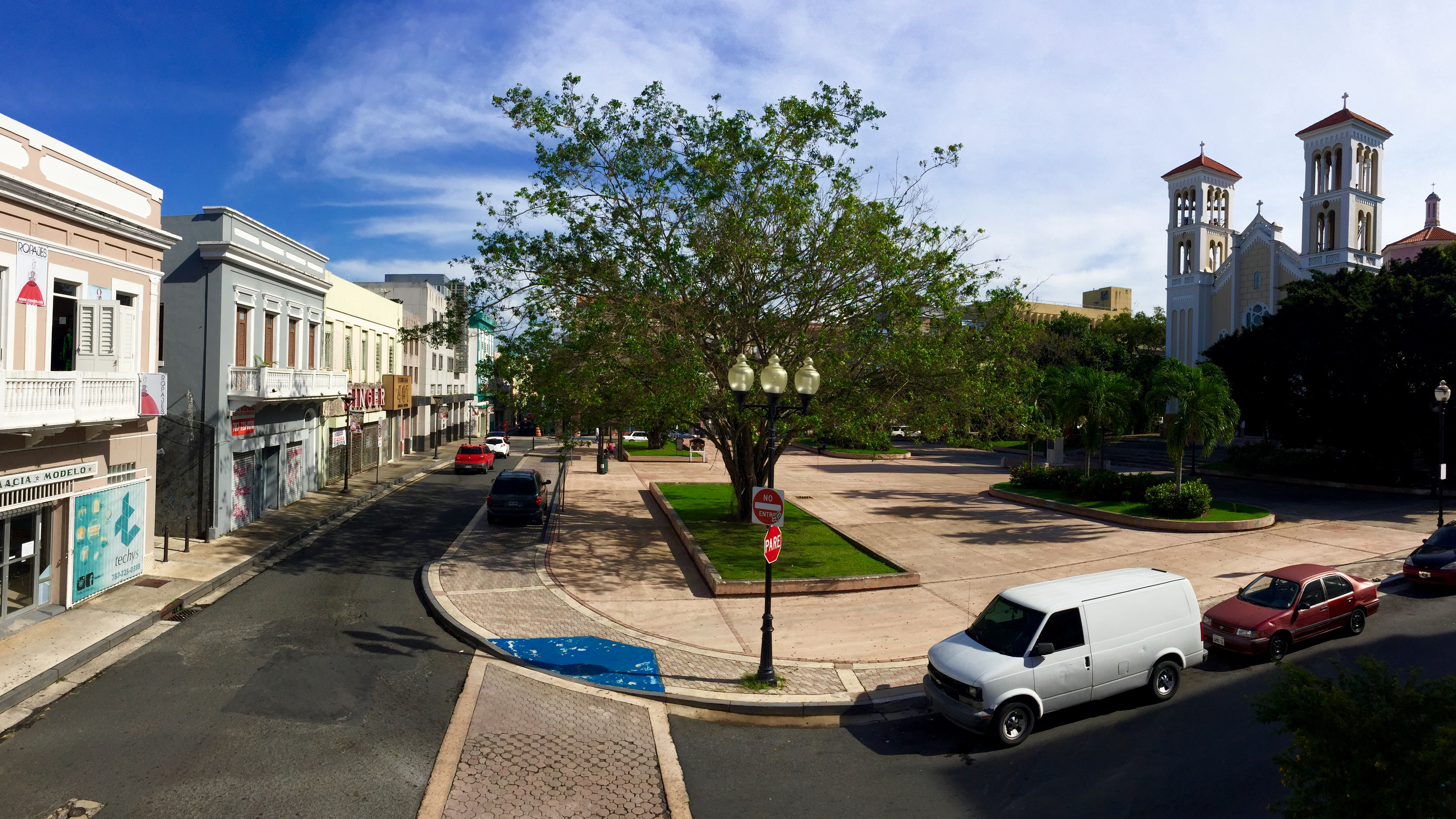
Plaza de la Convalecencia in Río Piedras Pueblo

== Major intersections ==
The entire route is located in San Juan.

Location	km	mi	Destinations	Notes
Monacillo Urbano	0.0	0.0	PR-177	Southern terminus of PR-8838
Monacillo Urbano	1.2	0.75	Southern terminus of Avenida Juan Ponce de León	
Monacillo Urbano	1.8	1.1	Avenida José de Diego (unsigned)	
El Cinco	2.7	1.7	PR-176 south (Avenida Ana G. Méndez) – Cupey	
El Cinco	3.0	1.9	To PR-1 south / PR-21 west – Guaynabo, Caguas	Seagull intersection; former PR-8839
El Cinco	3.3	2.1	PR-1 north	Northern terminus of PR-8838
Gap in route
El Cinco–Pueblo– Hato Rey Sur tripoint	0.0	0.0	PR-1 / PR-3 east / PR-847 (Calle Guaracanal)	Clockwise terminus of PR-3 and western terminus of PR-847
Gap in route
Pueblo–Hato Rey Sur line	11.1	6.9	PR-3 west to PR-1 north	Southern terminus of PR-25; PR-3 westbound exit and PR-1 northbound entrance; unsigned
Universidad–Hato Rey Sur line	10.0– 9.9	6.2– 6.2	PR-17 (Expreso Jesús T. Piñero) to PR-18	Diamond interchange
Hato Rey Central–Hato Rey Norte line	8.8	5.5	PR-1 / PR-Calle Betances	Inbound access only; PR-1 north traffic joins PR-25 north traffic along Avenida Juan Ponce de León north
Hato Rey Central–Hato Rey Norte line	8.4	5.2	PR-41 / PR-Calle José Martí	Northern terminus of PR-41
Hato Rey Central–Hato Rey Norte line	8.05	5.00	PR-23 (Avenida Franklin D. Roosevelt) to PR-18	
Hato Rey Central–Hato Rey Norte line	7.7	4.8	Avenida Quisqueya (PR-40)	Inbound access only; western terminus of PR-40; eastbound access via Calle Bolivia (km 7.8)
Caño Martín Peña	7.0	4.3	Puente de Martín Peña	
Santurce	6.85	4.26	PR-1 north (Expreso Luis Muñoz Rivera) – San Juan, Bayamón, Santurce	PR-1 north traffic splits onto Expreso Luis Muñoz Rivera north
Santurce	6.5	4.0	PR-36	Western terminus of PR-36
Santurce	5.7	3.5	Avenida José Fidalgo Díaz (unsigned)	
Santurce	5.2	3.2	PR-37 (Avenida José de Diego / Calle Doctor Manuel Fernández Pavía)	No turn to westbound
Santurce	5.05	3.14	PR-22 west (Autopista José de Diego) – San Juan, Bayamón, Caguas	PR-22 exit 0A
Santurce	4.35	2.70	PR-2 (Avenida Roberto H. Todd)	
Santurce	3.8	2.4	PR-39 (Calle Cerra) / PR-Calle Elisa Colberg	One-way street; northern terminus of PR-39
Santurce	2.9 3.35 (Note: Kilometer markers represent the distance along PR-1 rather than PR-25.)	1.8 2.08	PR-1 south / PR-16 south / PR-26 east (Expreso Román Baldorioty de Castro) / PR-Calle Olimpo – Bayamón, Caguas, Río Piedras, Isla Grande, Aeropuerto, Carolina	Southern terminus of PR-1 concurrency; northern terminus of PR-16 and Avenida Juan Ponce de León, and western terminus of PR-26
Caño de San Antonio	3.25	2.02	Puente Guillermo Esteves and Puente San Antonio	
San Juan Antiguo	3.05 2.8	1.90 1.7	PR-1 north / PR-25P north / PR-Avenida Ashford – Viejo San Juan, Condado	Northern terminus of PR-1 concurrency; southern terminus of PR-25P and Avenida de la Constitución
San Juan Antiguo	1.0	0.62	Paseo Covadonga (PR-38)	Inbound access only; eastern terminus of PR-38; westbound access via Calle Reverendo Gerardo Dávila (km 0.75)
San Juan Antiguo	0.0	0.0	Avenida Luis Muñoz Rivera (PR-25P) / Calle del Recinto Sur	Northern terminus of PR-25, PR-25P and Avenida de la Constitución
San Juan Antiguo	0.0	0.0	Calle de la Fortaleza	Continuation beyond PR-25P
1.000 mi = 1.609 km; 1.000 km = 0.621 mi: Concurrency terminus; Incomplete access; Route transition

== Related route ==
Highway 25R
- Location: San Juan
- Length: 2.7 km (1.7 mi)

Puerto Rico Highway 25R (Spanish: Carretera Ramal 25, abbreviated Ramal PR-25 or PR-25R) is a one way avenue in San Juan. The road begins at Avenida de la Constitución (PR-25) in Old San Juan, heading through a one-way highway along the Atlantic Ocean, and going back through to the concurrency of PR-25 and PR-1 in Puerta de Tierra. The entire route is located in San Juan Antiguo, San Juan.

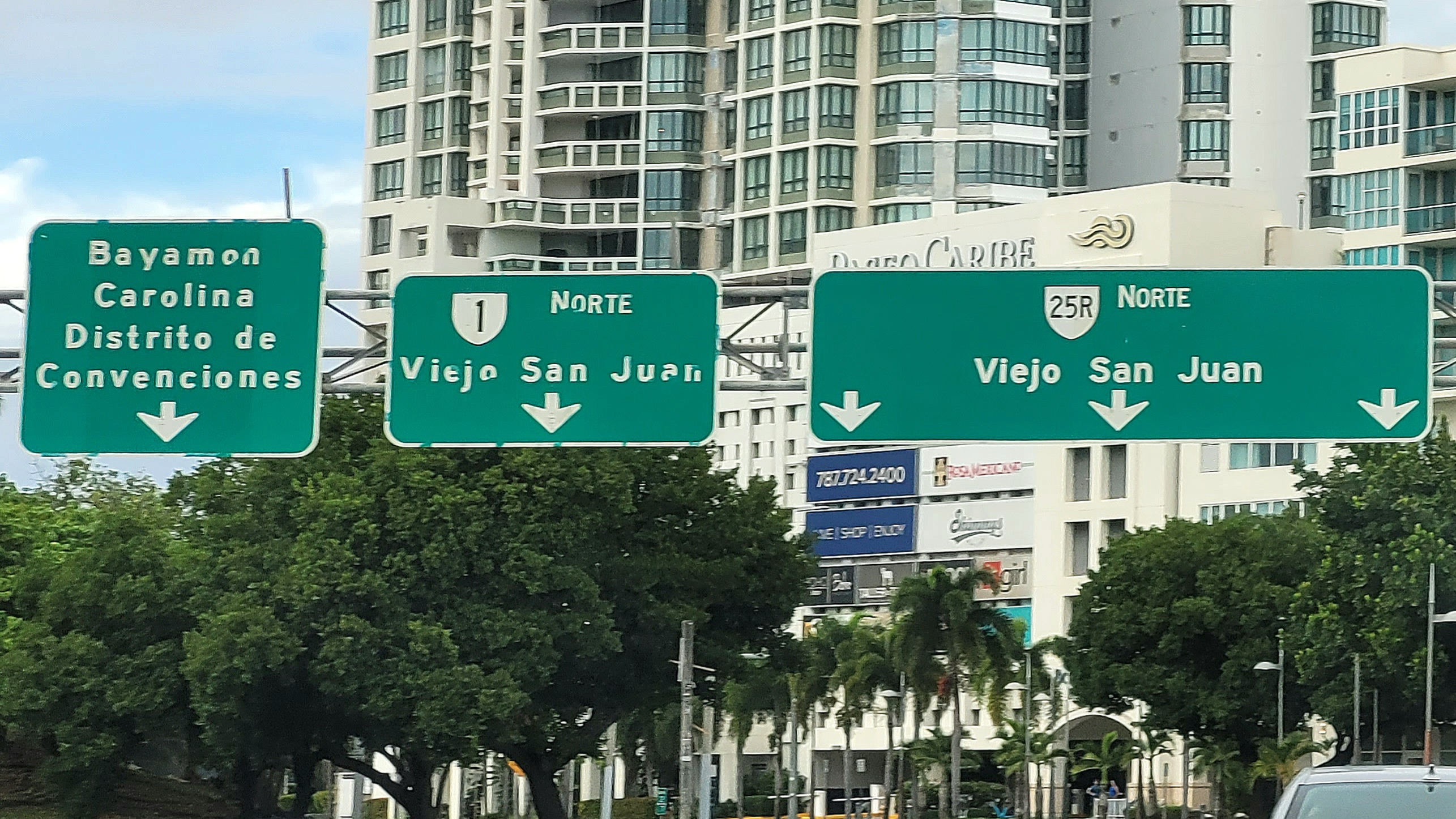
PR-1 north at PR-25R interchange

km	mi	Destinations	Notes
2.7	1.7	PR-1	Southern terminus of PR-25R
0.0	0.0	Avenida de la Constitución (PR-25 south) / Calle de la Fortaleza	One-way streets; northern terminus of PR-25R and PR-25
0.0	0.0	Calle del Recinto Sur	Continuation beyond PR-25
1.000 mi = 1.609 km; 1.000 km = 0.621 mi

== See also ==
- Carretera Central (Puerto Rico)
- List of streets in San Juan, Puerto Rico
