= Puerto Rico Highway 38 =

Highway in Puerto Rico

Highway 38
- Ruta 38
- Paseo Covadonga

Route information
- Maintained by Puerto Rico DTPW
- Length: 1.08 km (0.67 mi)

Major junctions
- West end: Calle Recinto Sur in San Juan Antiguo
- East end: PR-25 in San Juan Antiguo

Location
- Country: United States
- Territory: Puerto Rico
- Municipalities: San Juan

Highway system
- Roads in Puerto Rico; List
← PR-37	→ PR-39

Puerto Rico Highway 38 (PR-38) is an urban route lying entirely in the Puerto Rican capital city of San Juan. PR-38 is co-extensive with Paseo Covadonga.

Puerto Rico Highway 38

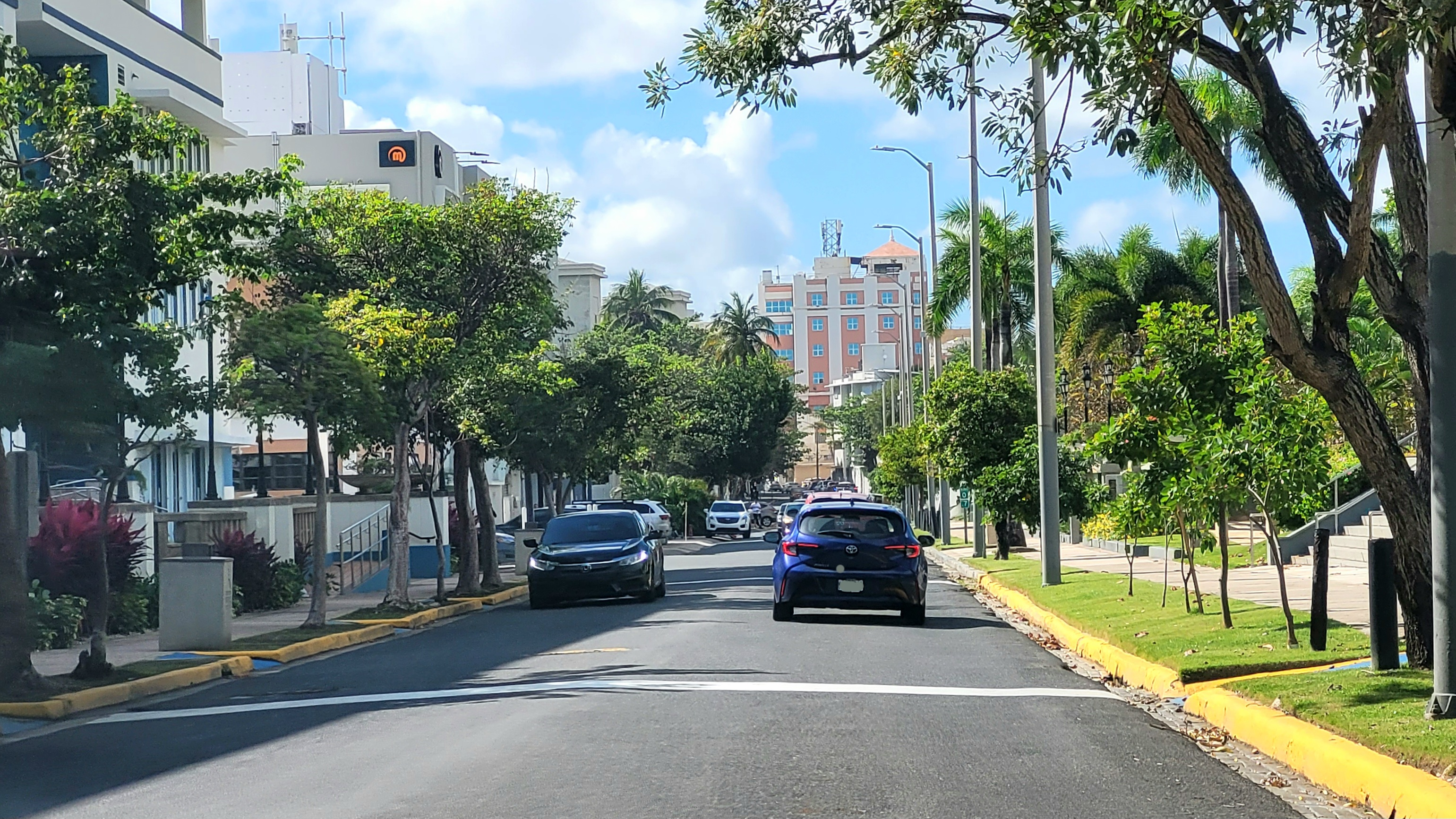
Heading west in Puerta de Tierra

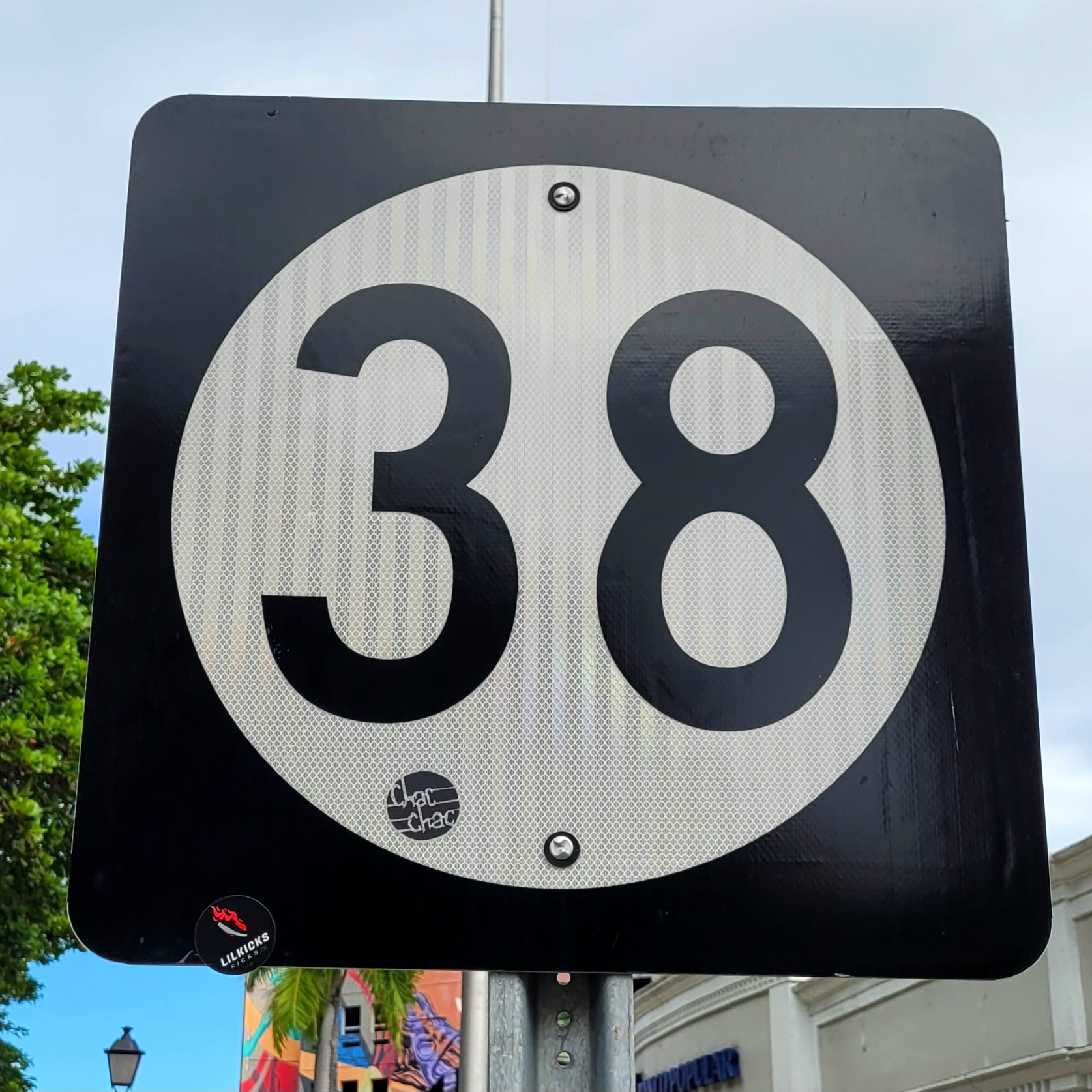
Eastbound sign near the western terminus in Old San Juan

== Major intersections ==
The entire route is located in San Juan Antiguo, San Juan.

km	mi	Destinations	Notes
0.00	0.00	Calle del Recinto Sur	One-way street; western terminus of PR-38
1.08	0.67	PR-25 south	One-way street; eastern terminus of PR-38; unsigned
1.000 mi = 1.609 km; 1.000 km = 0.621 mi
