= Puerto Rico Highway 36 =

Highway in Puerto Rico

Highway 36
- Ruta 36
- Avenida Borinquen

Route information
- Maintained by Puerto Rico DTPW
- Length: 1.5 km (0.93 mi)

Major junctions
- West end: PR-25 in Santurce
- East end: PR-27 in Santurce

Location
- Country: United States
- Territory: Puerto Rico
- Municipalities: San Juan

Highway system
- Roads in Puerto Rico; List
← PR-35	→ PR-37

Puerto Rico Highway 36 (PR-36) is an urban road in Santurce. This is a road that connects from Avenida Juan Ponce de León (PR-25) to Avenida Barbosa (PR-27). It provides access to Barrio Obrero, Las Palmas and Las Casas from Martín Peña and the southern part of Monteflores. This road is called Avenida Borinquen.

Puerto Rico Highway 36

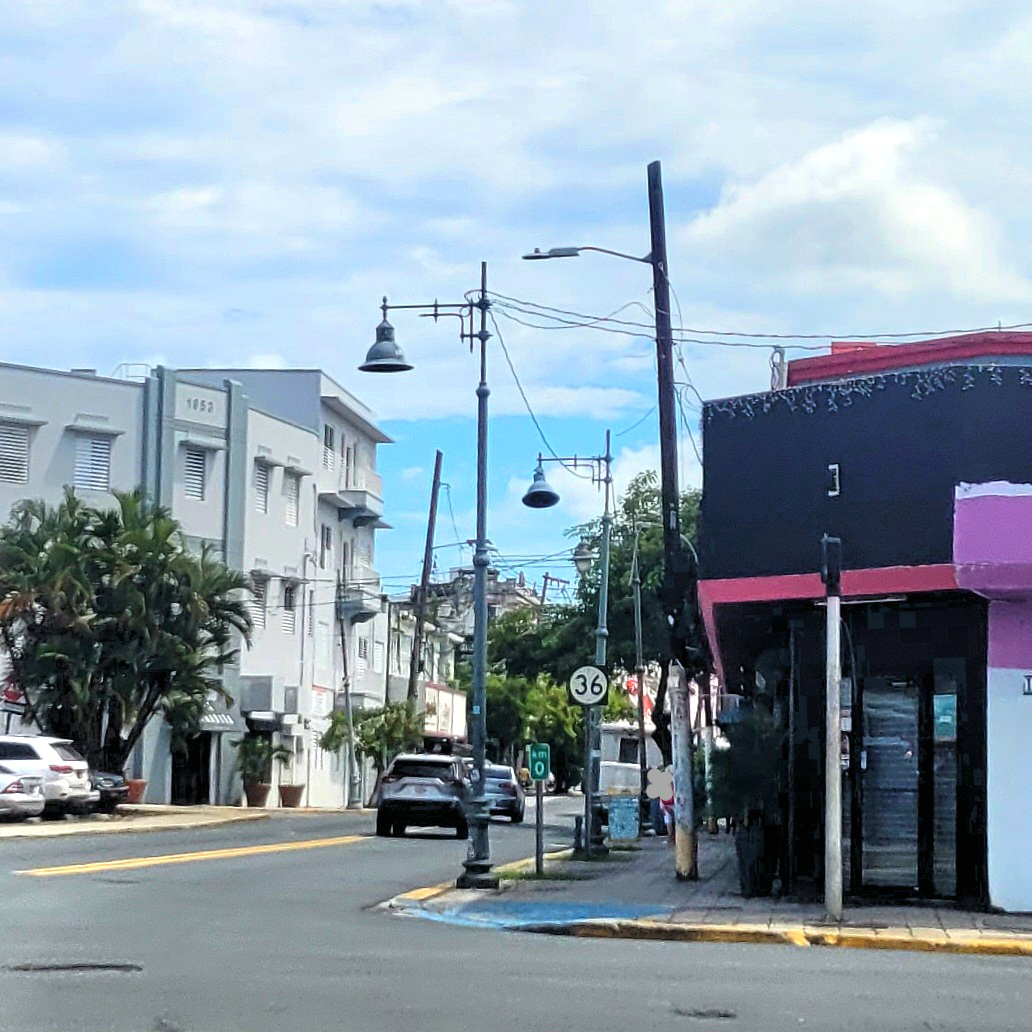
Western terminus at PR-25 junction, looking east

== Major intersections ==
The entire route is located in Santurce, San Juan.

km	mi	Destinations	Notes
0.0	0.0	PR-25 north	One-way street; western terminus of PR-36; unsigned
1.5	0.93	PR-27 (Avenida Barbosa)	Eastern terminus of PR-36 and northern terminus of PR-27; access to Río Piedras
1.000 mi = 1.609 km; 1.000 km = 0.621 mi
