= J. Raymond Watson =

Puerto Rican engineer (1935–2020)

- Born: September 7, 1935; San Juan, Puerto Rico
- Died: March 24, 2020 (aged 84)
- Education: Central High School
- Spouse: Brunilda
- Children: John
- Engineering career
- Institutions: University of Puerto Rico at Mayagüez School of Engineering
- Practice name: Raymond Watson and Associates
- Employer: Puerto Rico's Highways Authority
- Significant design: Puerto Rico's toll roads system

J. Raymond Watson, the engineer who established Puerto Rico's toll roads system, was born in San Juan, Puerto Rico on September 7, 1935, lived in Guaynabo, Puerto Rico and died March 24, 2020. With his wife Brunilda he had one son, John, and three grandchildren.

== Education ==
After graduating from San Juan's Central High School in 1952, he obtained two Bachelor's degrees from the University of Puerto Rico at Mayagüez, in Civil Engineering (Cum Laude) and in Mathematical Sciences (Magna Cum Laude) in 1956 before completing a Master's degree in Civil Engineering, with Honors, from the Massachusetts Institute of Technology (MIT) in 1958. After completing his education, he served as an assistant professor at the University of Puerto Rico School of Engineering.

== Public service ==
Governor Luis A. Ferré recruited Watson to serve as Executive Director of Puerto Rico's Highways Authority from 1969 to 1972. He established what was then a revolutionary policy in Puerto Rico, the construction of toll roads in which user fees paid the cost of road-building. As a result, the construction of the expressway between Puerto Rico's two largest cities at the time, San Juan and Ponce, leapfrogged and was completed within several years, cutting travel time by two thirds, from almost four hours to one hour and fifteen minutes.

After transforming Puerto Rico's road-building activities, Watson served as area director for the U.S. Department of Housing and Urban Development from 1974 until he was recruited in 1977 by Governor Carlos Romero Barceló to serve as the president of the government-owned Puerto Rico Telephone Company until 1979. In 1978 he attempted unsuccessfully to sell the phone system to private enterprise.

In private practice, he established two engineering firms, Raymond Watson and Associates and Watson & Villate. He also headed Prescon Caribe Inc., Abarca Enterprises and served as President of the Palmas del Mar Company, a self-contained city-within-a-city in Humacao, Puerto Rico.

Watson was retired at the time of his dying on March 24, 2020, but had remained an observer of Puerto Rico's political scene and his opinions were quoted frequently in island publications.

== See also ==
- List of highways in Puerto Rico
