= Puerto Rico Highway 40 =

Highway in Puerto Rico

Highway 40
- Ruta 40
- Avenida Quisqueya

Route information
- Maintained by Puerto Rico DTPW
- Length: 0.9 km (0.56 mi; 3,000 ft)

Major junctions
- West end: PR-25 in Hato Rey Norte–Hato Rey Central
- East end: PR-27 in Hato Rey Central–Oriente

Location
- Country: United States
- Territory: Puerto Rico
- Municipalities: San Juan

Highway system
- Roads in Puerto Rico; List
← PR-39	→ PR-41

Puerto Rico Highway 40 (PR-40) is an urban road in Hato Rey. This is a short road that connects from the PR-25 (Avenida Juan Ponce de León) to PR-27 (Avenida José Celso Barbosa). This road is called Avenida Quisqueya.

== Major intersections ==
The entire route is located in San Juan.

Location	km	mi	Destinations	Notes
Hato Rey Norte–Hato Rey Central line	0.0	0.0	PR-25 north – Santurce, San Juan	One-way street; western terminus of PR-40
Hato Rey Central–Oriente line	0.9	0.56	PR-27 – Las Casas, Santurce, Río Piedras	Eastern terminus of PR-40
1.000 mi = 1.609 km; 1.000 km = 0.621 mi
