= Puerto Rico Highway 27 =

Highway in Puerto Rico

Highway 27
- Ruta 27
- Avenida José Celso Barbosa

Route information
- Maintained by Puerto Rico DTPW
- Length: 4.9 km (3.0 mi)

Major junctions
- South end: PR-3 in Sabana Llana Sur–Pueblo
- PR-47 in Pueblo; PR-899 in Universidad; PR-17 in Universidad; PR-23 in Oriente–Hato Rey Central; PR-40 in Oriente–Hato Rey Central
- North end: PR-36 in Santurce

Location
- Country: United States
- Territory: Puerto Rico
- Municipalities: San Juan

Highway system
- Roads in Puerto Rico; List
← PR-26	→ PR-28

Puerto Rico Highway 27 (PR-27) is a north–south avenue located in San Juan, Puerto Rico, known as Avenida José Celso Barbosa. This highway extends from Avenida 65 de Infantería (PR-3) to Avenida Borinquen (PR-36) in Santurce, east of downtown Río Piedras and Hato Rey.

== Major intersections ==
The entire route is located in San Juan.

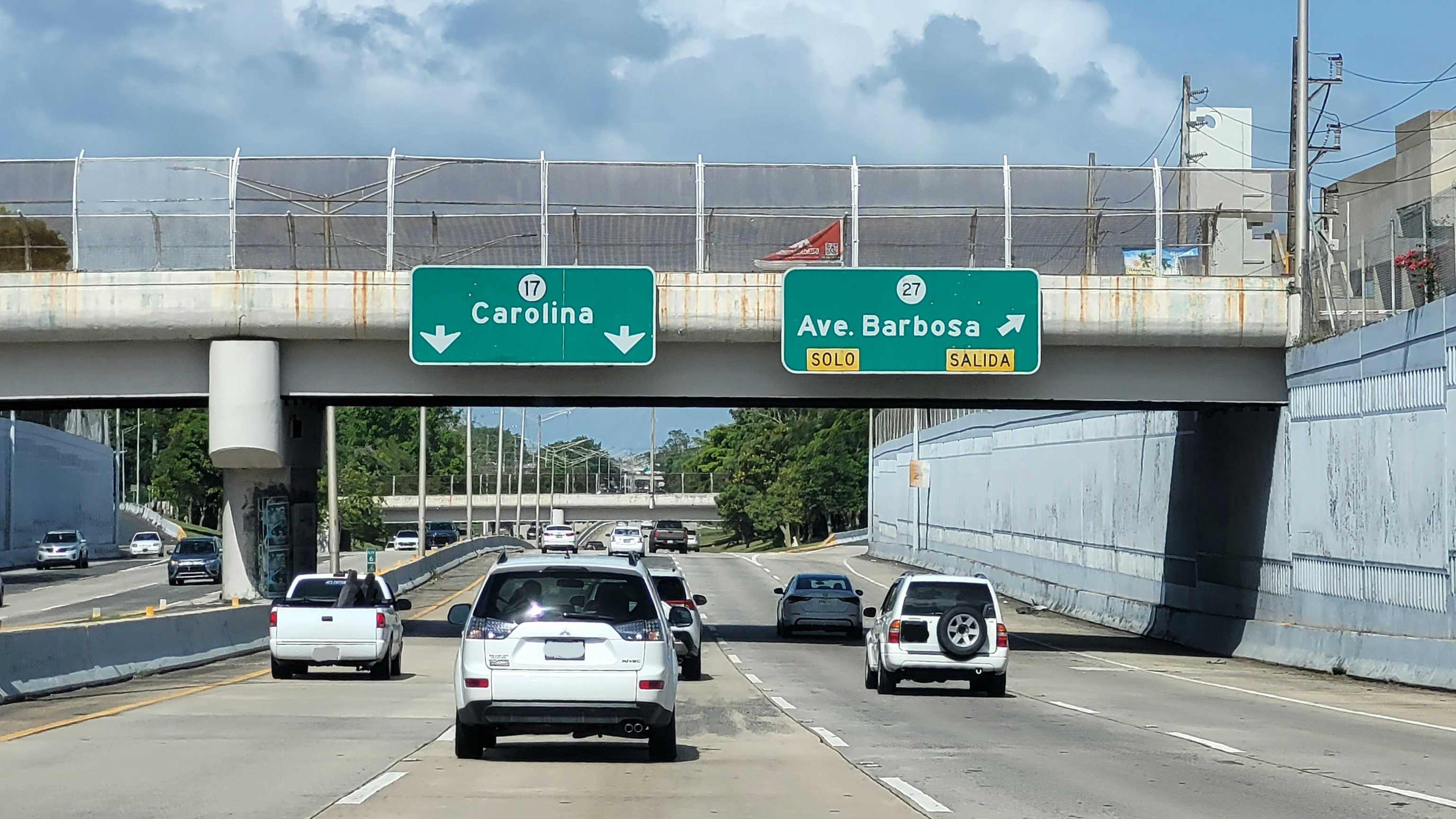
PR-17 east at PR-27 exit in Universidad

Location	km	mi	Destinations	Notes
Sabana Llana Sur–Pueblo line	0.0	0.0	PR-3 (Avenida 65 de Infantería) – Carolina, Trujillo Alto, Caguas, Cupey	Southern terminus of PR-27
Pueblo	0.4	0.25	PR-47 (Calle De Diego) – Río Piedras, Carolina	
Universidad	0.8	0.50	PR-899 (Avenida Ramón B. López) / PR-Avenida Dr. José N. Gándara – Río Piedras	
Universidad	1.4– 1.5	0.87– 0.93	PR-17 (Expreso Jesús T. Piñero) – San Juan, Guaynabo, Carolina, Trujillo Alto	Diamond interchange
Oriente–Hato Rey Central line	3.6	2.2	PR-23 west (Avenida Franklin Delano Roosevelt) – Hato Rey	
Oriente–Hato Rey Central line	3.8	2.4	PR-40 (Avenida Quisqueya) – Hato Rey	
Santurce	4.9	3.0	PR-36 (Avenida Borinquen) – San Juan, Santurce	Northern terminus of PR-27
1.000 mi = 1.609 km; 1.000 km = 0.621 mi

== See also ==
- José Celso Barbosa
