= Puerto Rico Highway 939 =

Highway in Puerto Rico

Highway 939
- Ruta 939

Route information
- Maintained by Puerto Rico DTPW
- Length: 2.9 km (1.8 mi)

Major junctions
- South end: PR-760 in Emajagua–Quebrada Arenas–Maunabo barrio-pueblo
- PR-3 in Quebrada Arenas–Maunabo barrio-pueblo–Talante
- North end: Sector Quebrada Arenas in Quebrada Arenas

Location
- Country: United States
- Territory: Puerto Rico
- Municipalities: Maunabo

Highway system
- Roads in Puerto Rico; List
← PR-908	→ PR-955

Puerto Rico Highway 939 (PR-939) is a road located in Maunabo, Puerto Rico. This highway extends from PR-760 in downtown Maunabo to Quebrada Arenas.

== Major intersections ==
The entire route is located in Maunabo.

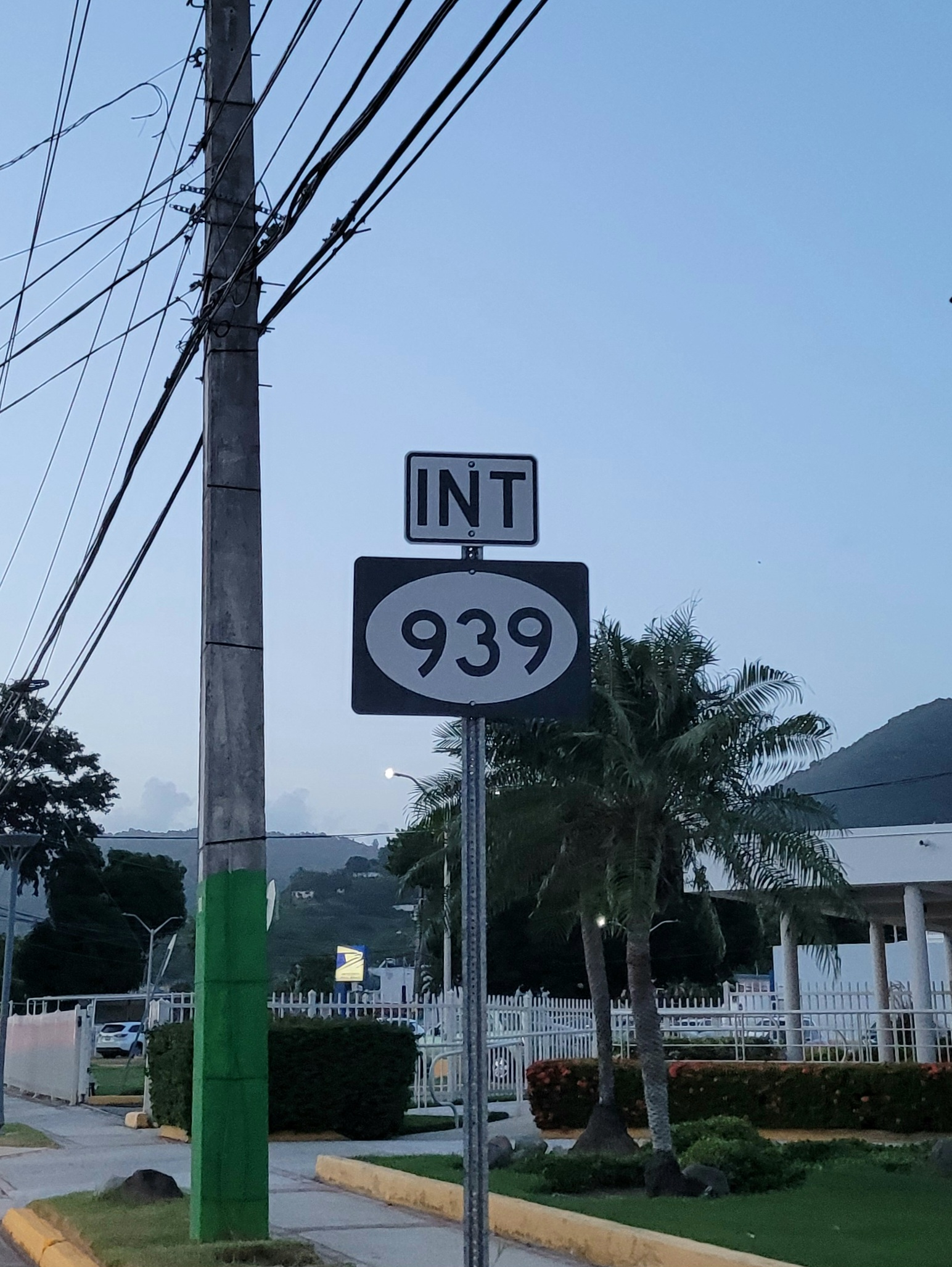
PR-760 west approaching PR-939 intersection

Location	km	mi	Destinations	Notes
Emajagua–Quebrada Arenas– Maunabo barrio-pueblo tripoint	0.0	0.0	PR-760 (Avenida John F. Kennedy) – Patillas, Yabucoa	Southern terminus of PR-939; southern terminus of the Ruta Panorámica concurrency; the Ruta Panorámica continues toward Yabucoa via Calabazas
Quebrada Arenas–Maunabo barrio-pueblo– Talante tripoint	0.6	0.37	PR-3 – Maunabo, Yabucoa	Northern terminus of the Ruta Panorámica concurrency; the Ruta Panorámica continues toward Yabucoa via Emajagua–Camino Nuevo
Quebrada Arenas	2.9	1.8	Northern terminus of PR-939 at Sector Quebrada Arenas; dead end road	
1.000 mi = 1.609 km; 1.000 km = 0.621 mi: Concurrency terminus
