= Puerto Rico Highway 760 =

Highway in Puerto Rico

Highway 760
- Ruta 760

Route information
- Maintained by Puerto Rico DTPW
- Length: 3.9 km (2.4 mi)
- Existed: 1953–present

Major junctions
- West end: PR-3 in Talante–Emajagua–Maunabo barrio-pueblo
- PR-939 in Emajagua–Quebrada Arenas–Maunabo barrio-pueblo; PR-901 in Emajagua; PR-7760 in Emajagua
- East end: Punta Tuna Light in Emajagua

Location
- Country: United States
- Territory: Puerto Rico
- Municipalities: Maunabo

Highway system
- Roads in Puerto Rico; List
← PR-744	→ PR-798
← PR-7741	PR-7760	→ PR-8176

Puerto Rico Highway 760 (PR-760) is a rural road located in Maunabo, Puerto Rico. It begins at its intersection with PR-3 near downtown Maunabo and ends at Punta Tuna Light.

== Major intersections ==
The entire route is located in Maunabo.

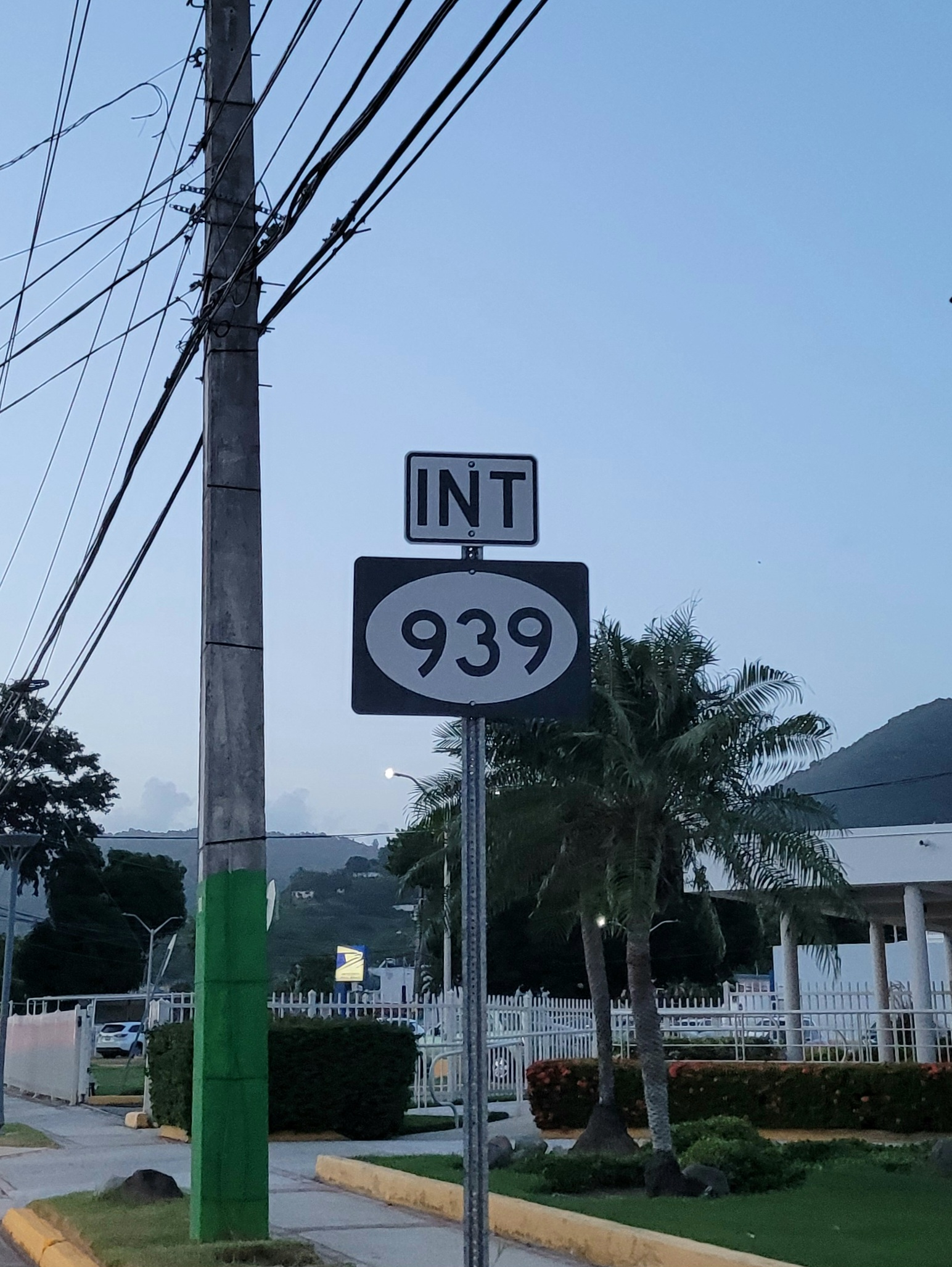
PR-760 west near PR-939 intersection near downtown Maunabo

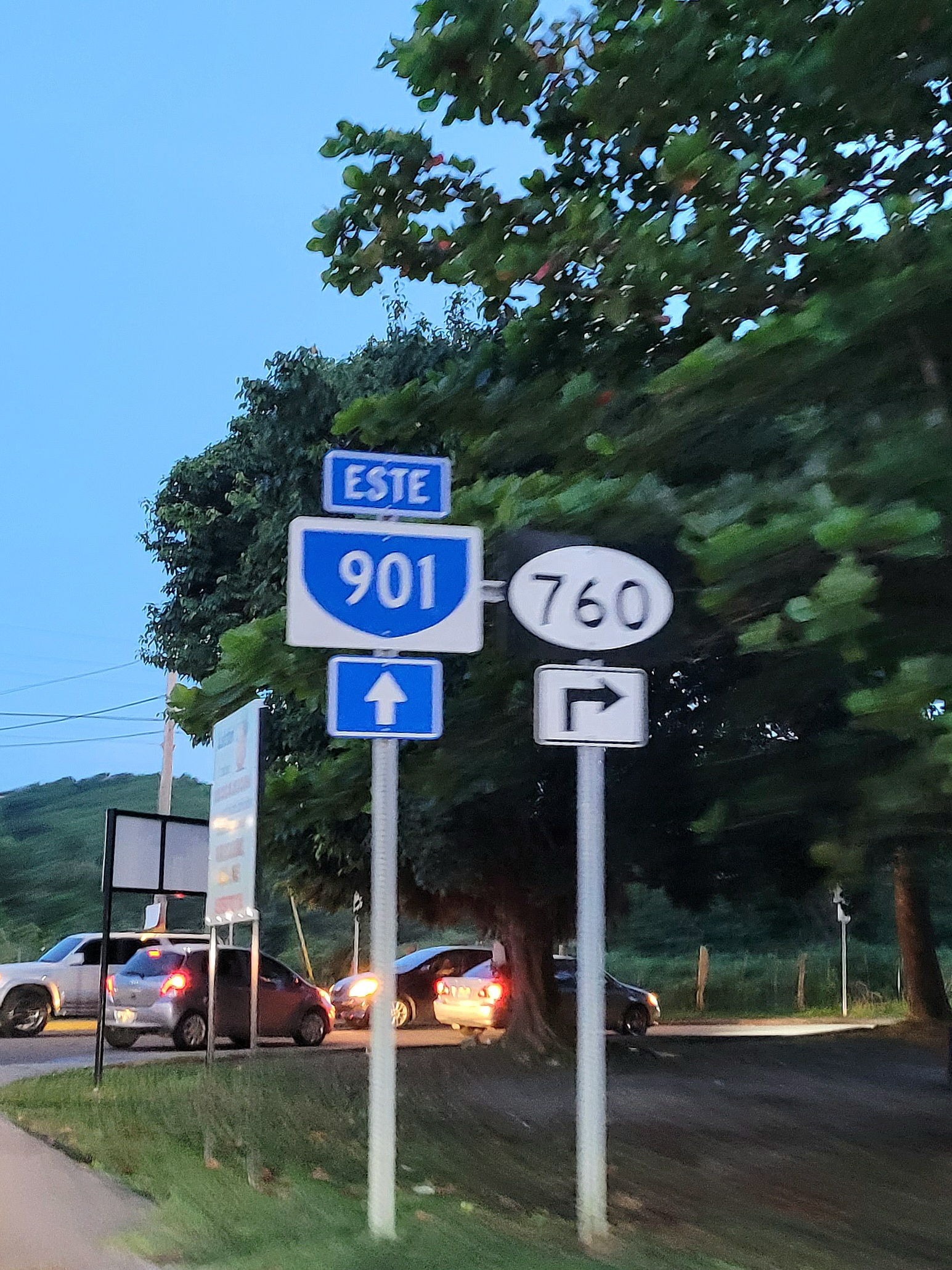
PR-760 east at PR-901 intersection in Emajagua

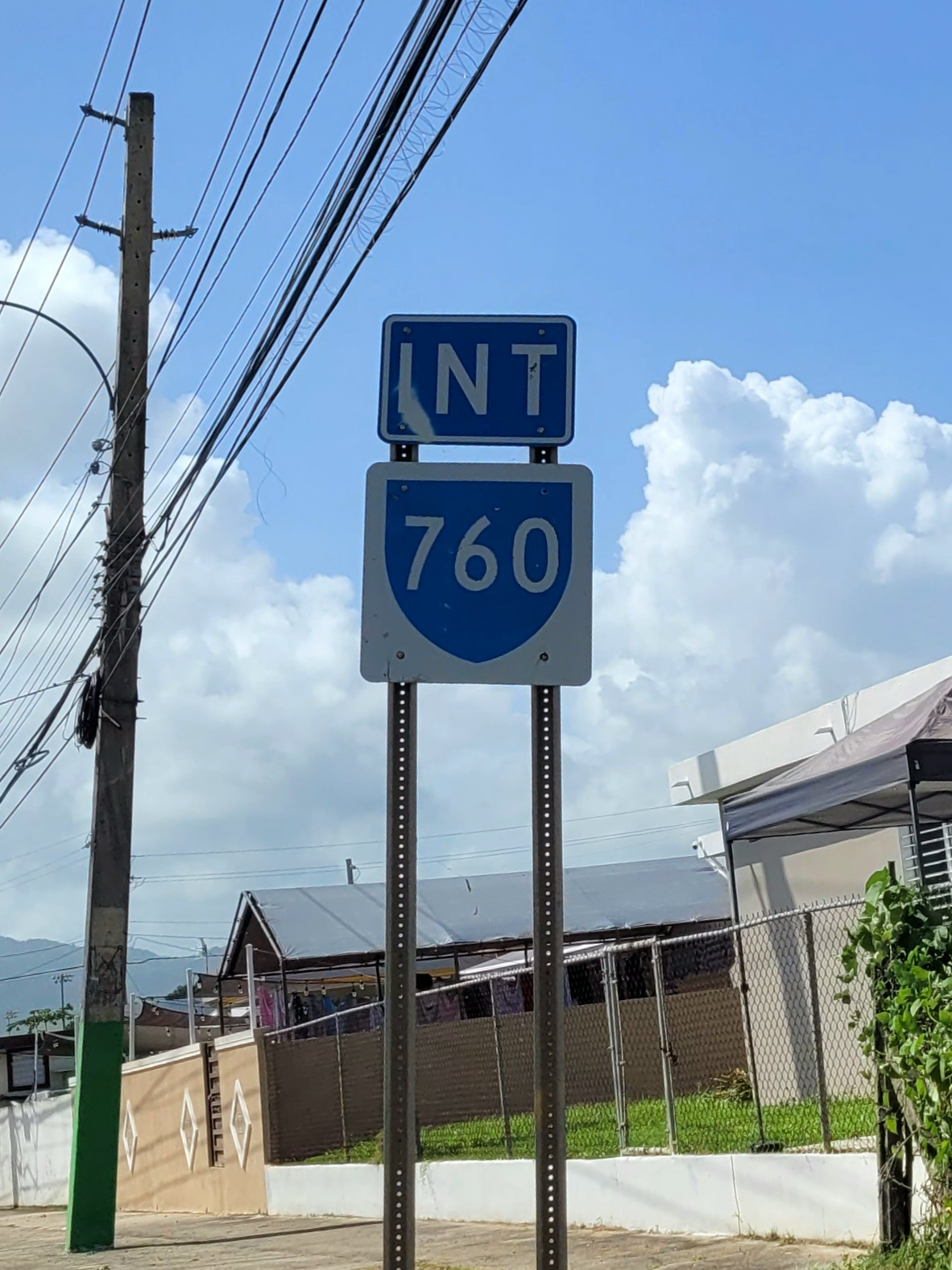
PR-901 south approaching PR-760 junction in Emajagua

Location	km	mi	Destinations	Notes
Talante–Emajagua– Maunabo barrio-pueblo tripoint	0.0	0.0	PR-3 – Patillas, Yabucoa	Western terminus of PR-760
Emajagua–Quebrada Arenas– Maunabo barrio-pueblo tripoint	0.6	0.37	PR-939 (Avenida Emilio Calimano) to PR-3 – Yabucoa, Humacao	Western terminus of the Ruta Panorámica concurrency; the Ruta Panorámica continues toward Yabucoa via Quebrada Arenas–Talante
Emajagua	1.5	0.93	PR-901 north (Carretera Ernesto Carrasquillo) – Yabucoa	Eastern terminus of the Ruta Panorámica concurrency; the Ruta Panorámica continues toward Yabucoa via Emajagua–Camino Nuevo
Emajagua	3.7	2.3	PR-7760 – Bordaleza	
Emajagua	3.9	2.4	Eastern terminus of PR-760 at Punta Tuna Light; dead end road	
1.000 mi = 1.609 km; 1.000 km = 0.621 mi: Concurrency terminus

== Related route ==
Highway 7760
- Location: Maunabo
- Length: 1.9 km (1.2 mi)

Puerto Rico Highway 7760 (PR-7760) is a spur route located in Maunabo. It extends from PR-760, near Punta Tuna Light, to PR-901 in Emajagua barrio. The entire route is located in Emajagua, Maunabo.

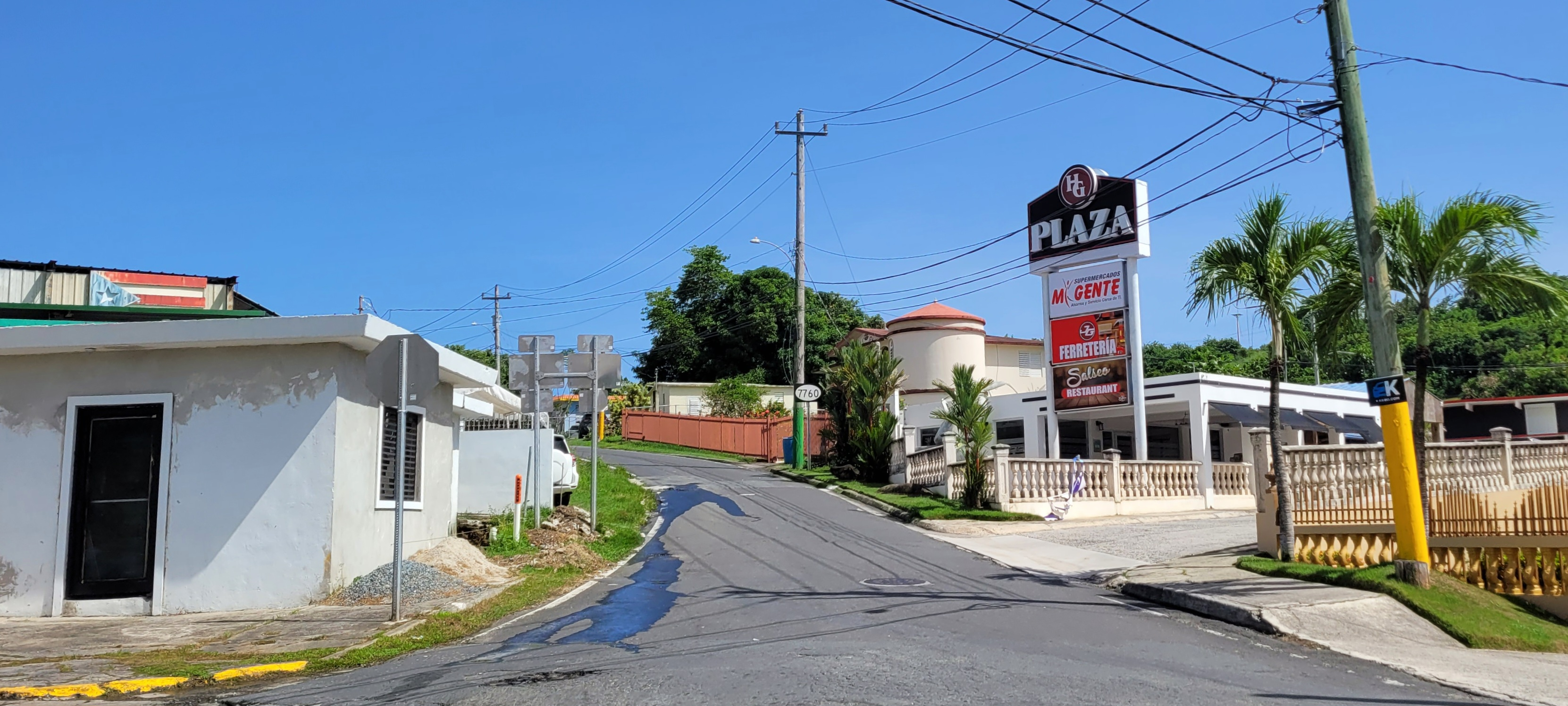
Northern terminus at PR-901 junction in Emajagua, looking south

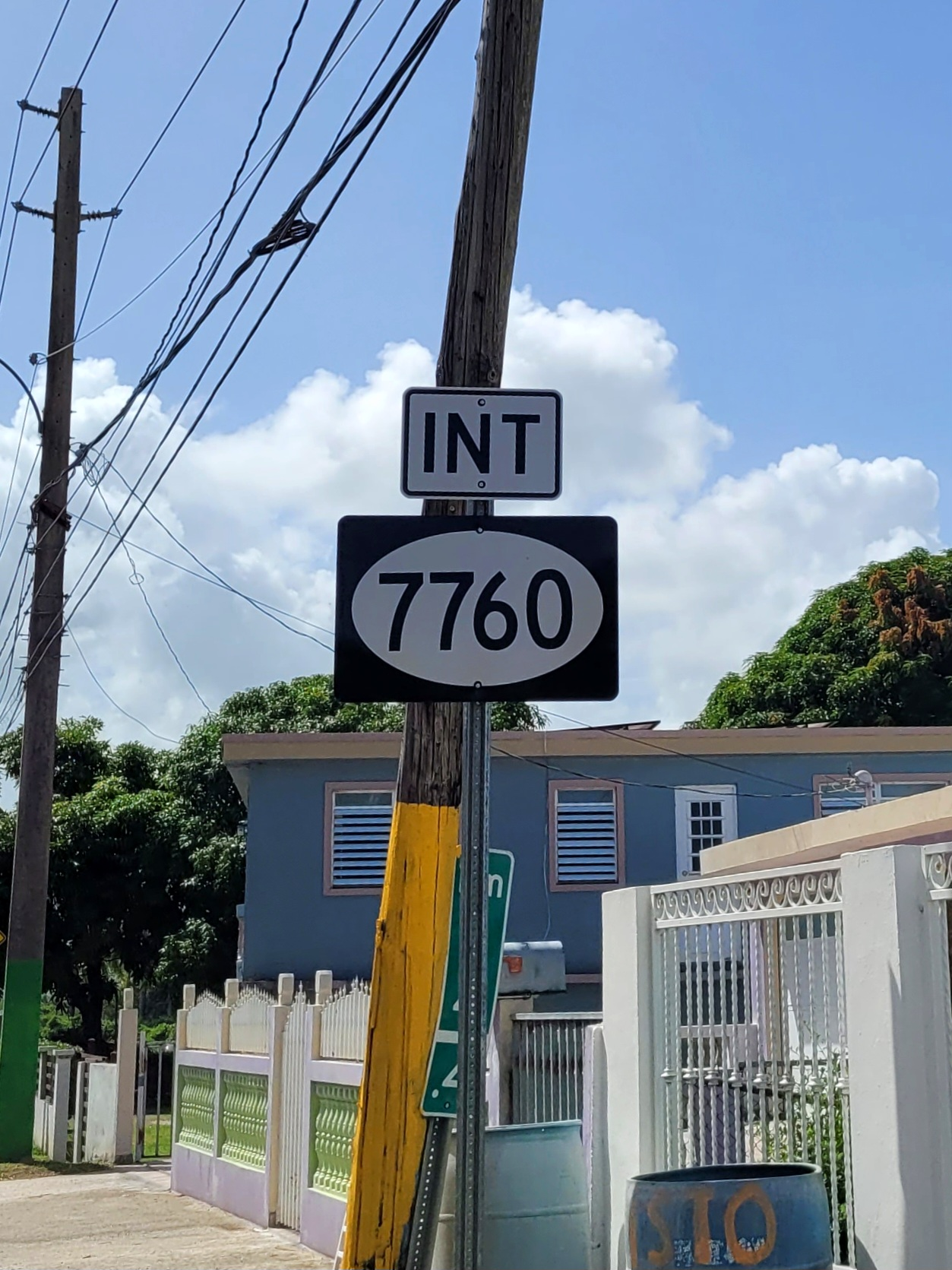
PR-901 south near PR-7760 intersection in Emajagua

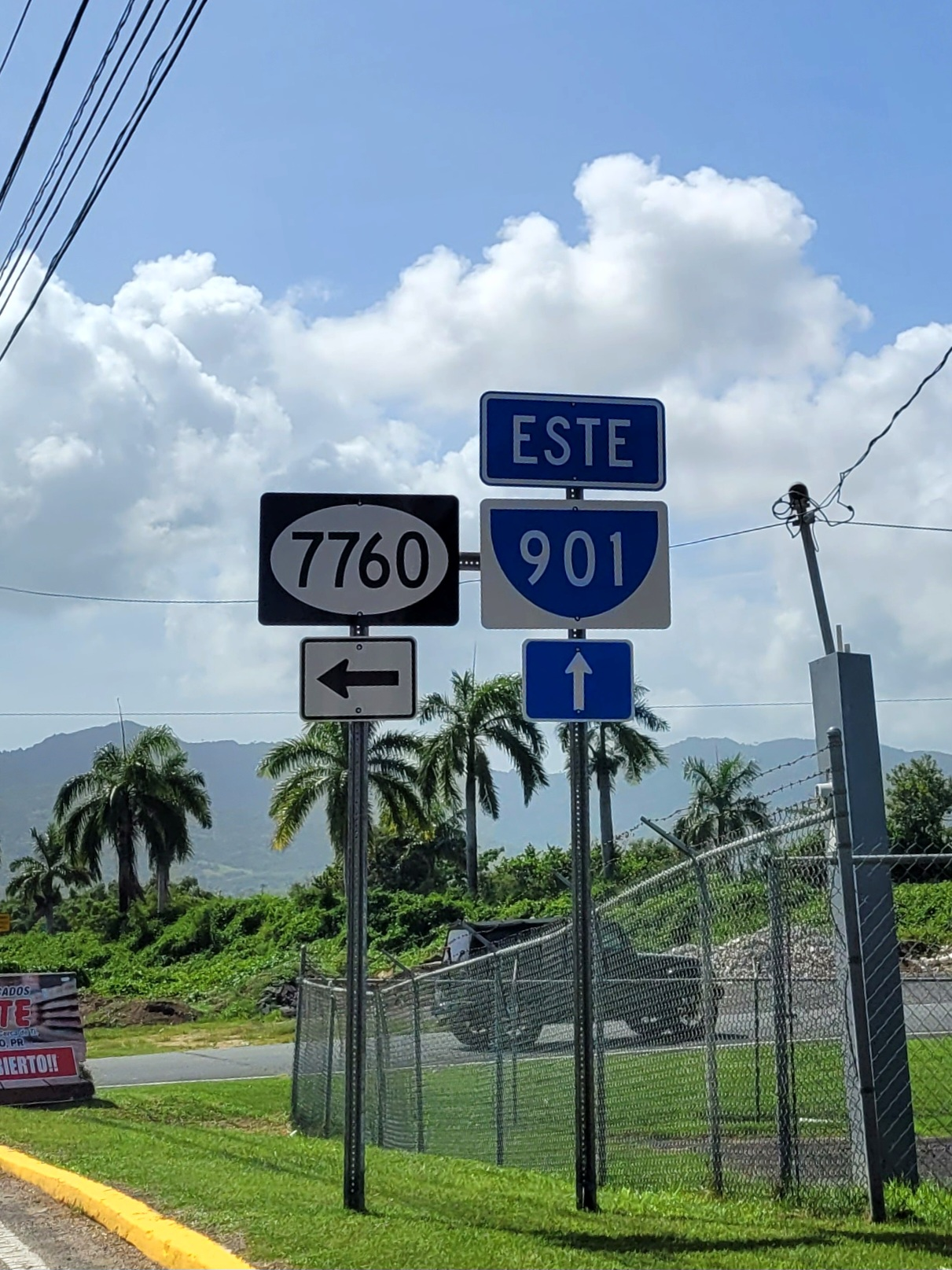
PR-901 south at PR-7760 intersection in Emajagua

km	mi	Destinations	Notes
0.0	0.0	PR-760 – Emajagua	Southern terminus of PR-7760
1.9	1.2	PR-901 (Carretera Ernesto Carrasquillo / Ruta Panorámica) – Maunabo, Yabucoa	Northern terminus of PR-7760
1.000 mi = 1.609 km; 1.000 km = 0.621 mi

== See also ==
- 1953 Puerto Rico highway renumbering
