= Ruta Panorámica =

Highway in Puerto Rico

Route information
- Maintained by Puerto Rico DTPW
- Length: 266 km (165 mi)
- Existed: 1970s–present

Major junctions
- West end: Calle Tamarindo in Mayagüez barrio-pueblo
- PR-119 in Montoso–Naranjalres–Naranjalres; PR-120 in Maricao barrio-pueblo–Maricao Afuera; PR-10 in Saltillo; PR-149 in Ala de la Piedra–Villalba Arriba; PR-155 in Pedro García–Bauta Arriba–Bermejales; PR-14 in Asomante–Pasto; PR-1 in Pasto Viejo–Pedro Ávila–Sumido–Matón Arriba; PR-15 in Culebras Bajo–Jájome Alto; PR-184 in Guavate–Farallón–Muñoz Rivera; PR-181 in Espino–Quebrada Arenas–Guayabota
- East end: PR-3 in Talante–Maunabo barrio-pueblo–Quebrada Arenas

Location
- Country: United States
- Territory: Puerto Rico
- Municipalities: Mayagüez, Las Marías, Maricao, San Germán, Sabana Grande, Yauco, Lares, Adjuntas, Utuado, Ponce, Jayuya, Juana Díaz, Orocovis, Villalba, Coamo, Barranquitas, Aibonito, Cayey, Guayama, Patillas, San Lorenzo, Yabucoa, Maunabo

Highway system
- Roads in Puerto Rico; List

The Ruta Panorámica (Scenic Route), officially the Ruta Panorámica Luis Muñoz Marín (Luis Muñoz Marín Scenic Route), is a 167-mile (269 km) network of some 40 secondary roads which traverse the island of Puerto Rico from west to east along its Cordillera Central (Central Mountain Range). Most of the route consists of three roads, PR-105, PR-143, and PR-182. The route starts in Mayagüez and ends in Maunabo. The first major segment of the route runs from Mayagüez to Maricao as Route 105, then from Adjuntas to Aibonito as Route 143, and then follows Route 182 toward Maunabo.

== Route description ==
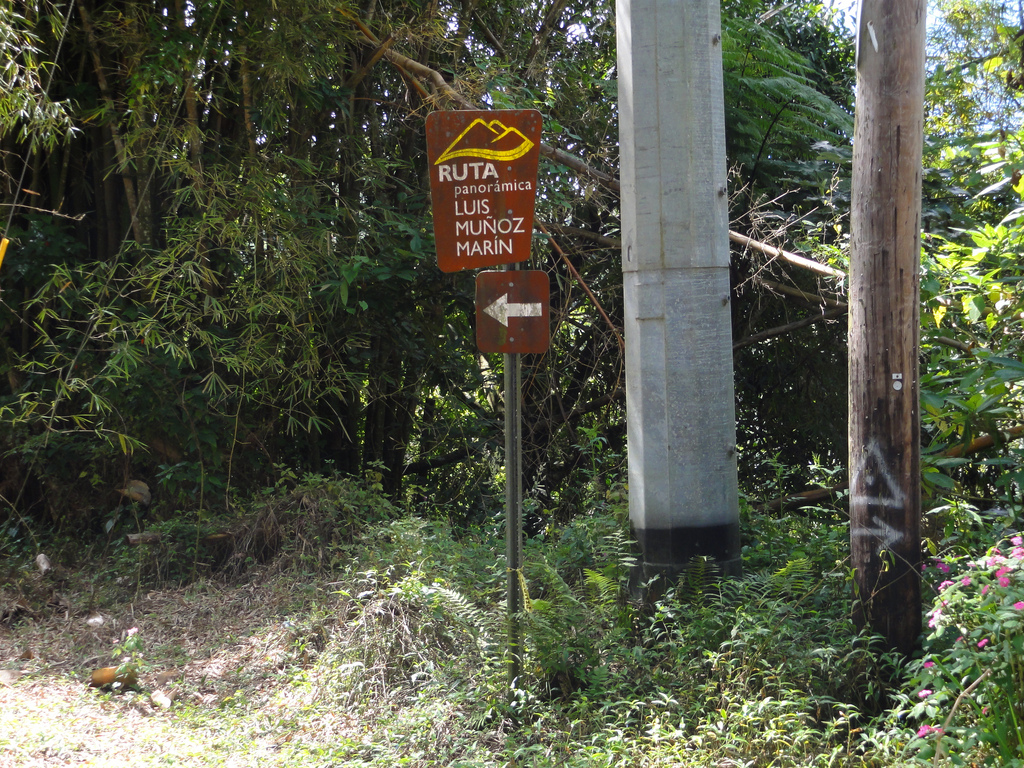
A sign on westbound PR-143 in Barrio Ala de la Piedra, Orocovis, pointing out Ruta Panorámica near PR-149

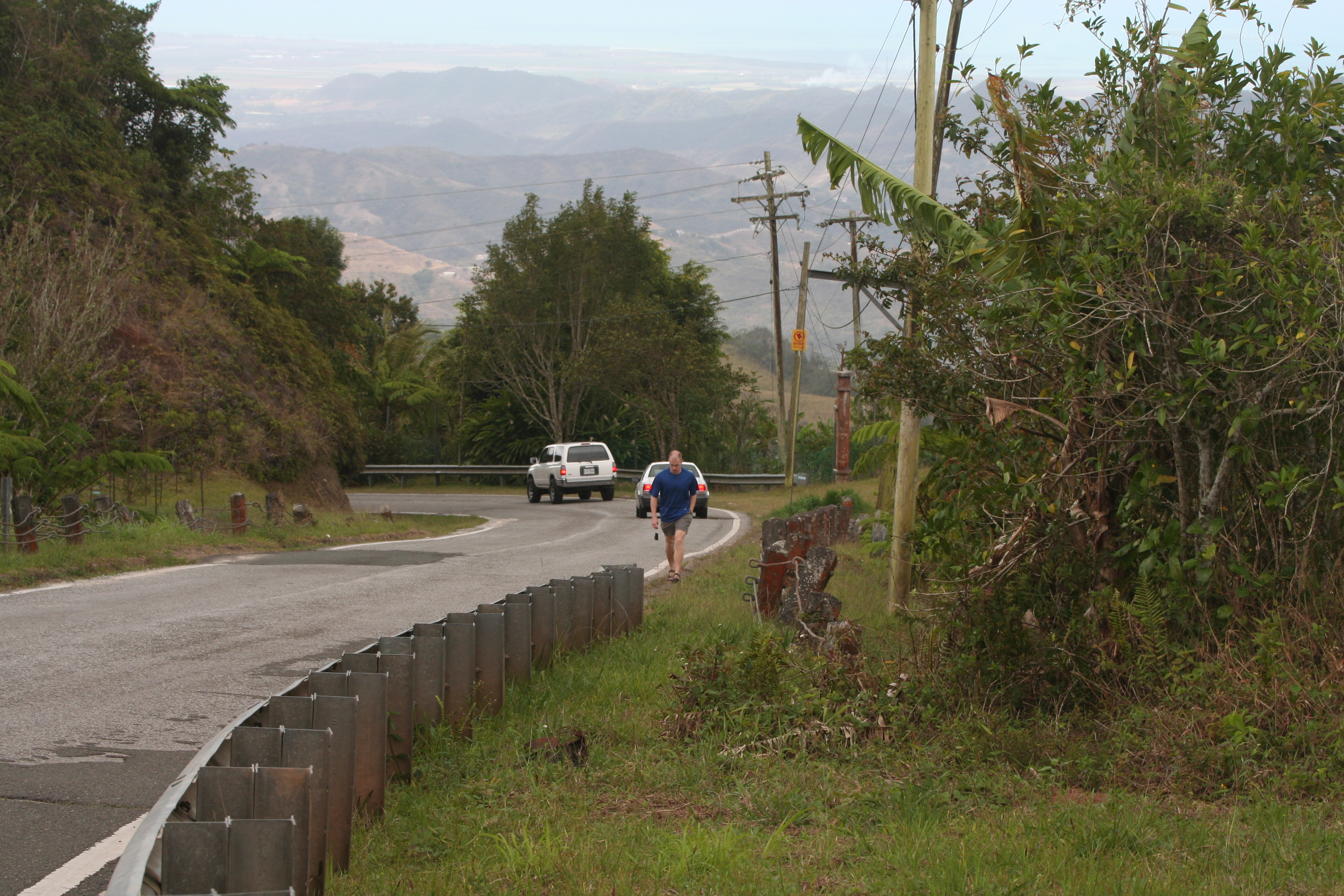
The Ruta Panorámica in Collores, Juana Díaz

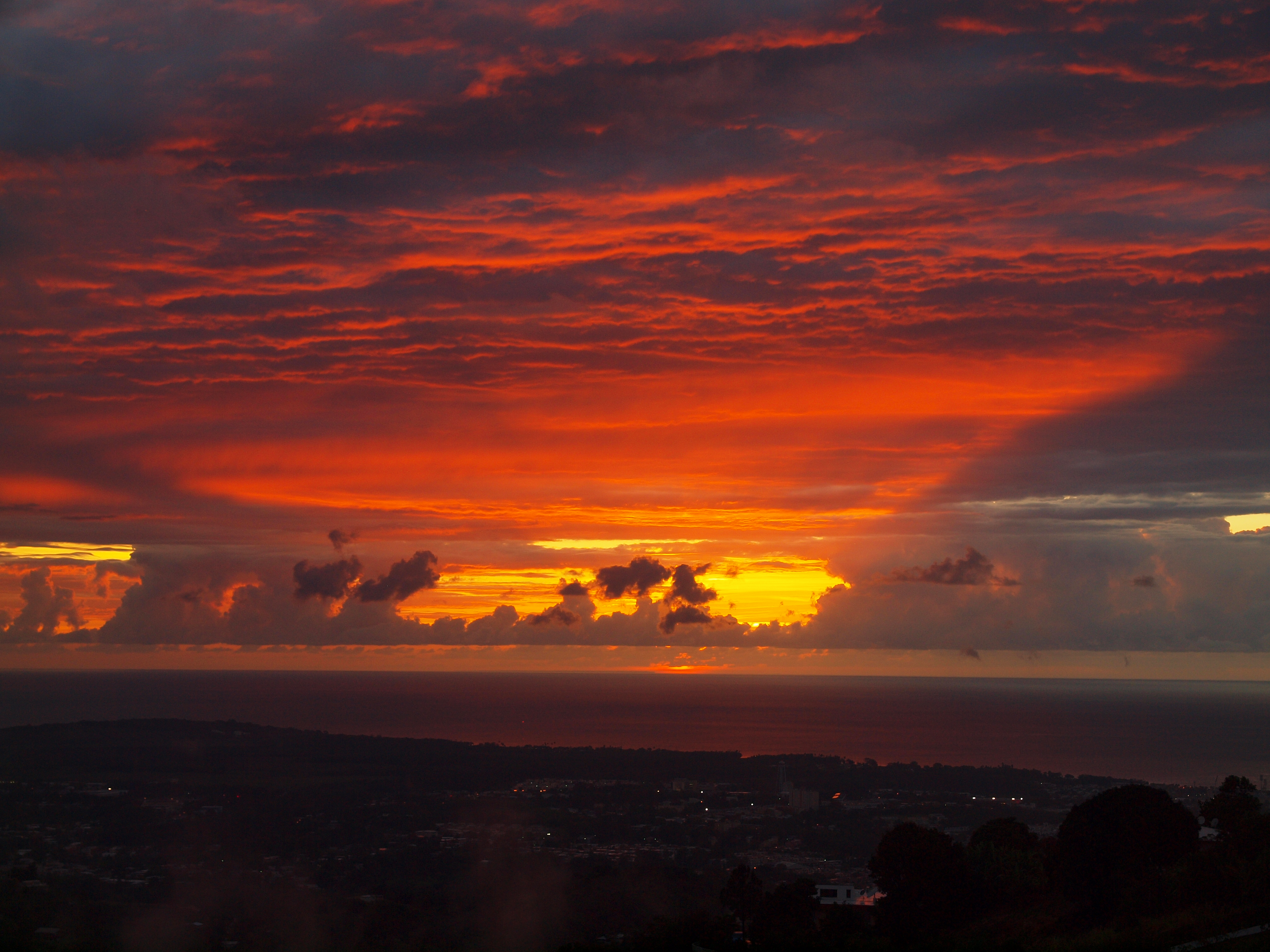
View from Cerro Las Mesas Natural Protected Area (CLMNPA) in Mayagüez

As the Route is a two-way road, it can be traveled starting at either its western or its eastern termini. To travel the Route in a westerly direction (i.e., from Maunabo to Mayagüez), the course of the road is reversed from what is given here. Starting from Mayagüez and ending in Maunabo, as of August 2010, the course of the Route is as follows:

PR-105 Municipality of Mayagüez (Eastbound)
PR-339 Municipality of Mayagüez (Eastbound)
PR-119 Municipality of Mayagüez (Northbound)
PR-106 Municipality of Mayagüez (Eastbound)
PR-106 Municipality of Las Marias (Eastbound)
PR-120 Municipality of Las Marias (Southbound)
PR-120 Municipality of Maricao (Southbound)
PR-120 Municipalities of Maricao and San Germán (Eastbound) (Note: Whenever one of the roads of the Route is also the boundary between two municipalities, both municipalities are shown in the course of the Route above. For example, PR-120 Municipalities of Maricao and San Germán (Eastbound).)
PR-120 Municipalities of Maricao and Sabana Grande (Eastbound)

Landmark: Maricao State Forest, site of Monte del Estado

PR-366 Municipalities of Maricao and Sabana Grande (Eastbound)
PR-365 Municipalities of Maricao and Yauco (Eastbound)
PR-105 Municipalities of Maricao and Yauco (Eastbound)
PR-128 Municipality of Maricao (Northbound)
PR-128 Municipality of Lares (Northbound)
PR-135 Municipality of Lares (Eastbound)
PR-135 Municipality of Adjuntas (Eastbound)

Landmark: Lago Guayo

PR-525 Municipality of Adjuntas (Eastbound)
PR-518 Municipality of Adjuntas (Eastbound)

Landmark: Lago Garzas

PR-123 Municipality of Adjuntas (Southbound)
PR-143 Municipality of Adjuntas (Eastbound)
PR-143 Municipality of Ponce (Eastbound)

Landmark: Toro Negro State Forest

PR-143 Municipality of Jayuya (Eastbound)
PR-143 Municipality of Ponce (Eastbound)
PR-143 Municipality of Villalba (Eastbound)

Landmark: Salto de Doña Juana Waterfall (2 miles)
Landmark: Villalba Overlook

PR-143 Municipality of Orocovis (Eastbound)
PR-143 Municipality of Coamo (Eastbound)
PR-143 Municipality of Barranquitas (Eastbound)
PR-723 Municipality of Barranquitas (Southbound)
PR-7718 Municipality of Aibonito (Eastbound)

Landmark: Piedra Degetau Overlook

PR-7722 Municipality of Cayey (Eastbound)
PR-1 Municipality of Cayey (Eastbound)
PR-715 Municipality of Cayey (Southbound)
PR-7737 Municipality of Cayey (Eastbound)
PR-741 Municipality of Cayey (Eastbound)
PR-7741 Municipality of Cayey (Eastbound)
PR-742 Municipality of Cayey (Eastbound)
PR-179 Municipality of Cayey (Northbound)
PR-184 Municipality of Cayey (Southbound)

Landmark: Carite State Forest, Guavate

PR-7740 Municipalities of San Lorenzo and Patillas (Eastbound)
PR-181 Municipality of San Lorenzo (Southbound)
PR-182 Municipality of Yabucoa (Eastbound)
PR-901 Municipality of Yabucoa (Eastbound)
PR-3 Municipality of Yabucoa (Southbound)
PR-3 Municipality of Maunabo (Southbound)

== History ==
Early in the 1970s, the Autoridad de Carreteras de Puerto Rico (Puerto Rico Roads Authority) developed a 220-kilometer (140 mi) route along the Cordillera Central. The route was finished in 1974. According to the original plans, the route started at Cerro Las Mesas in Mayagüez, ran along the full length of the central mountains, including along parts of the length of the Sierra de Cayey to end at Cuchilla de Pandura, in Yabucoa. The development of the route included the building of overlooks, rest areas, and recreational facilities at a cost of $4 million. In 1975, it was estimated that the cost of the necessary facilities to complete the Route - but excluding roads already built - amounted to $20 million. National Geographic has called the route "an assemblage of 40-plus roads that cuts through the island's lush Cordillera Central."

== Major intersections ==
Note: kilometer markers represent the distance along the numbered highways rather than the Ruta Panorámica.

Municipality	Location	km	mi	Destinations	Notes
Mayagüez	Mayagüez barrio-pueblo	0.0	0.0	PR-Calle Tamarindo – Mayagüez	Western terminus of the Ruta Panorámica
Mayagüez	Limón	9.6 0.0	6.0 0.0	PR-339 east (Ruta Panorámica) – Limón	Eastern terminus through PR-105; western terminus through PR-339
Mayagüez	Montoso	5.0 61.4	3.1 38.2	PR-119 – Las Marías, Maricao, San Germán	Eastern terminus through PR-339; southern terminus through PR-119
Mayagüez	Naranjales	59.9 13.7	37.2 8.5	PR-106 west – Mayagüez	Western terminus of PR-106 concurrency; western terminus through PR-106
Mayagüez–Las Marías municipal line	Montoso–Naranjales line	14.3	8.9	PR-119 – Las Marías	Eastern terminus of PR-119 concurrency; northern terminus through PR-119
Las Marías	Naranjales–Maravilla Sur line	18.9 26.9	11.7 16.7	PR-120 – Las Marías, Maricao	Eastern terminus through PR-106; northern terminus through PR-120
Maricao	Maricao barrio-pueblo	20.2 24.7	12.6 15.3	PR-105 east (Calle Primero de Abril) – Lares, Yauco	Eastern terminus of PR-105 concurrency
Maricao	See PR-105				
Maricao	Maricao Afuera	23.1 20.1	14.4 12.5	PR-105 – Mayagüez	Western terminus of PR-105 concurrency
San Germán	No major junctions				
Sabana Grande	Santana–Tabonuco line	11.0 0.0	6.8 0.0	PR-366 (Ruta Panorámica) – Indiera Fría	Southern terminus through PR-120; western terminus through PR-366
Maricao–Sabana Grande municipal line	Indiera Fría–Tabonuco line	4.4 5.2	2.7 3.2	PR-365 (Ruta Panorámica) – Indiera Baja	Eastern terminus through PR-366; western terminus through PR-365
Yauco–Maricao municipal line	Rubias–Indiera Baja– Indiera Alta tripoint	0.0 42.7	0.0 26.5	PR-105 – Maricao, Yauco, Lares	Eastern terminus through PR-365; western terminus through PR-105
Maricao	Indiera Alta	43.4 25.7	27.0 16.0	PR-128 – Yauco, Lares	Eastern terminus through PR-105; southern terminus through PR-128
See PR-128
Lares	Bartolo	37.9 0.0	23.5 0.0	PR-135 (Ruta Panorámica) – Adjuntas	Northern terminus through PR-128; western terminus through PR-135
See PR-135
Adjuntas	Guayo	8.6 0.0	5.3 0.0	PR-525 (Ruta Panorámica) – Limaní	Eastern terminus through PR-135; western terminus through PR-525
Adjuntas	Guilarte	5.8 4.1	3.6 2.5	PR-131 – Guilarte	Western terminus through PR-525; northern terminus through PR-131
Adjuntas	Guilarte	7.9 12.1	4.9 7.5	PR-518 (Ruta Panorámica) – Adjuntas	Southern terminus through PR-131; western terminus through PR-518
Adjuntas	See PR-518				
Adjuntas	Adjuntas barrio-pueblo	0.0 34.3	0.0 21.3	PR-123 – Adjuntas, Ponce	Eastern terminus through PR-518; northern terminus through PR-123
Adjuntas	Saltillo	30.6 0.0	19.0 0.0	PR-143 (Ruta Panorámica) – Barranquitas	Southern terminus through PR-123; western terminus through PR-143
See PR-143
Barranquitas–Coamo municipal line	Helechal–Hayales line	54.1 9.6	33.6 6.0	PR-723 (Ruta Panorámica) – Aibonito, Pulguillas	Eastern terminus through PR-143; northern terminus through PR-723
Aibonito	Asomante–Pasto line	0.0 45.9	0.0 28.5	PR-14 (Carretera Central) – Aibonito, Coamo	Western terminus of the Carretera Central concurrency; southern terminus through PR-723; western terminus through PR-14; the Carretera Central continues toward Coamo
Aibonito	Asomante–Pasto line	46.8 3.5	29.1 2.2	PR-7718 east (Paseo Don Julio Francisco "Paco" Santos Vázquez) – Aibonito	Eastern terminus of the Carretera Central conrurrency; eastern terminus through PR-14; western terminus through PR-7718; the Carretera Central continues toward Cayey
Aibonito	Pasto–Robles line	0.0 0.0	0.0 0.0	PR-162 / PR-722 east (Ruta Panorámica) – Aibonito, Salinas, Cayey	Eastern terminus through PR-7718; western terminus through PR-722
Aibonito	Robles	2.7 6.3	1.7 3.9	PR-7722 east (Ruta Panorámica) – Cayey, Salinas	Eastern terminus through PR-722; western terminus through PR-7722
Cayey	Pasto Viejo–Pedro Ávila line	0.0 66.0	0.0 41.0	PR-1 – Cayey, Salinas	Eastern terminus through PR-7722; western terminus through PR-1
Cayey	Sumido–Matón Arriba line	61.1 0.0	38.0 0.0	PR-715 (Ruta Panorámica) – Cercadillo	Eastern terminus through PR-1; northern terminus through PR-715
Cayey	Sumido	2.2 3.4	1.4 2.1	PR-7737 (Ruta Panorámica) – Cayey, Guayama	Southern terminus through PR-715; western terminus through PR-7737
Cayey	Culebras Bajo	0.0 20.0	0.0 12.4	PR-15 – Cayey, Guayama	Eastern terminus through PR-7737; northern terminus through PR-15
Cayey	Jájome Alto–Culebras Bajo line	18.5 0.0	11.5 0.0	PR-741 (Ruta Panorámica) – Culebras Alto	Southern terminus through PR-15; western terminus through PR-741
Cayey	Culebras Alto	1.8 6.9	1.1 4.3	PR-7741 (Ruta Panorámica) – Carite	Eastern terminus through PR-741; western terminus through PR-7741
Guayama	Carite	0.0 0.6	0.0 0.37	PR-742 – Carite	Eastern terminus through PR-7741; northern terminus through PR-742
Guayama	Carite	0.0 9.8	0.0 6.1	PR-179 – Guayama, Cayey	Southern terminus through PR-742; southern terminus through PR-179
Cayey	Guavate	20.2 24.2	12.6 15.0	PR-184 – Cayey, Patillas	Northern terminus through PR-179; northern terminus through PR-184
Patillas	Muñoz Rivera	19.3 7.7	12.0 4.8	PR-7740 (Ruta Panorámica) – San Lorenzo	Southern terminus through PR-184; western terminus through PR-7740
San Lorenzo	Espino	0.0 20.6	0.0 12.8	PR-181 – San Lorenzo, Patillas	Eastern terminus through PR-7740; northern terminus through PR-181
Yabucoa	Guayabota	15.1 15.9	9.4 9.9	PR-182 (Ruta Panorámica) – Yabucoa	Southern terminus through PR-181; western terminus through PR-182
Yabucoa	See PR-182				
Yabucoa	Juan Martín	0.0 99.0	0.0 61.5	PR-3 – Maunabo, Humacao	Eastern terminus through PR-182; northern terminus through PR-3
Maunabo	Talante–Maunabo barrio-pueblo– Quebrada Arenas tripoint	106.9 0.6	66.4 0.37	PR-939 – Quebrada Arenas	Southern terminus through PR-3; northern terminus through PR-939
Maunabo	Maunabo barrio-pueblo–Quebrada Arenas– Emajagua tripoint	0.0 0.6	0.0 0.37	PR-760 (Avenida John F. Kennedy) – Patillas, Yabucoa	Southern terminus through PR-939; western terminus through PR-760
Maunabo	Emajagua	1.5 15.1	0.93 9.4	PR-901 north (Carretera Ernesto Carrasquillo) – Yabucoa	Eastern terminus through PR-760; southern terminus through PR-901
See PR-901
Yabucoa	Yabucoa barrio-pueblo	0.0	0.0	PR-9910 (Calle Cristóbal Colón) to PR-182 – Yabucoa	Eastern terminus of the Ruta Panorámica
1.000 mi = 1.609 km; 1.000 km = 0.621 mi: Concurrency terminus; Route transition

== See also ==
- List of highways in Ponce, Puerto Rico
- Carretera Central (Puerto Rico)
- Luis Muñoz Marín
