= Puerto Rico Highway 901 =

Highway in Puerto Rico

Highway 901
- Ruta 901
- Carretera Ernesto Carrasquillo

Route information
- Maintained by Puerto Rico DTPW
- Length: 15.1 km (9.4 mi)
- Existed: 1953–present

Major junctions
- South end: PR-760 in Emajagua
- PR-53 in Emajagua; PR-7760 in Emajagua; PR-53 in Emajagua; PR-9911 in Camino Nuevo; PR-9901 in Camino Nuevo; PR-9914 in Juan Martín; PR-3 in Juan Martín
- North end: PR-9910 in Yabucoa barrio-pueblo

Location
- Country: United States
- Territory: Puerto Rico
- Municipalities: Maunabo, Yabucoa

Highway system
- Roads in Puerto Rico; List
← PR-891	→ PR-908

Puerto Rico Highway 901 (PR-901) is a highway in the southeast coast of Puerto Rico which begins in Yabucoa an ends in Maunabo. This road begins at its junction with PR-182 in downtown Yabucoa and ends at its intersection with PR-760 in Emajagua barrio.

== Route description ==
PR-3 in Yabucoa enters downtown and continues uphill into the mountains. The Puerto Rico Department of Transportation designed PR-901 as a primary route while PR-53 is under construction, because it is a more direct way to the Maunabo area than PR-3, as the latter has more curves. PR-901 runs parallel to the coastline for several kilometers, but due to the mountains ending at the coastline, PR-901 run several hundred feet above sea level. This feature makes PR-901 a scenic route. Drivers traveling from Humacao to the area of Guayama are recommended to use PR-30 to PR-52 and then PR-53 (Salinas-Guayama) as opposed to using the PR-3/PR-901 route because it is safer and shorter. This by-pass will end when construction of PR-53 is completed. When PR-53 is finished, PR-901 will become a normal rural road, and PR-53 will become the primary route to Maunabo.

Puerto Rico Highway 901 by municipality

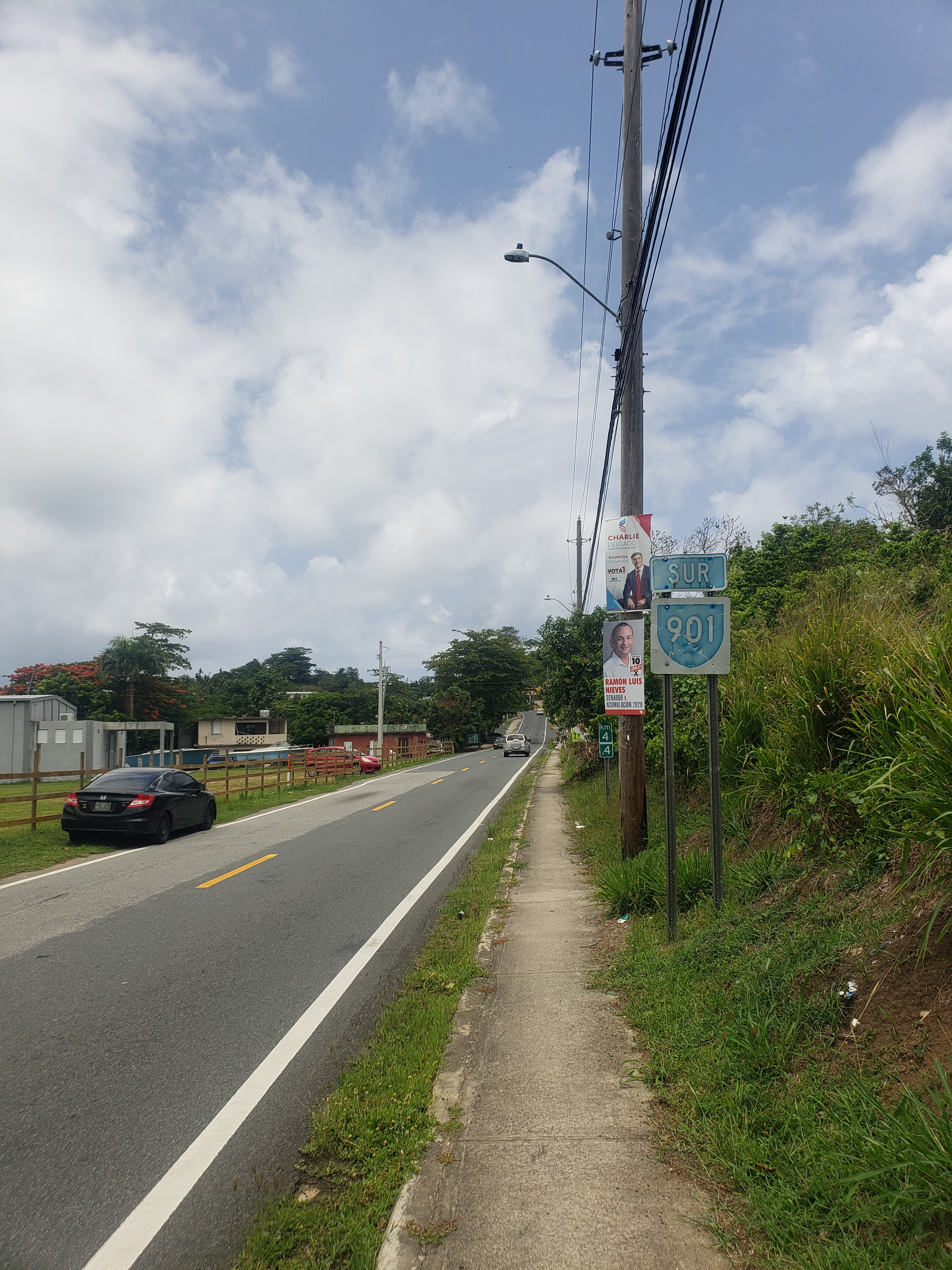
Heading south in Camino Nuevo, Yabucoa

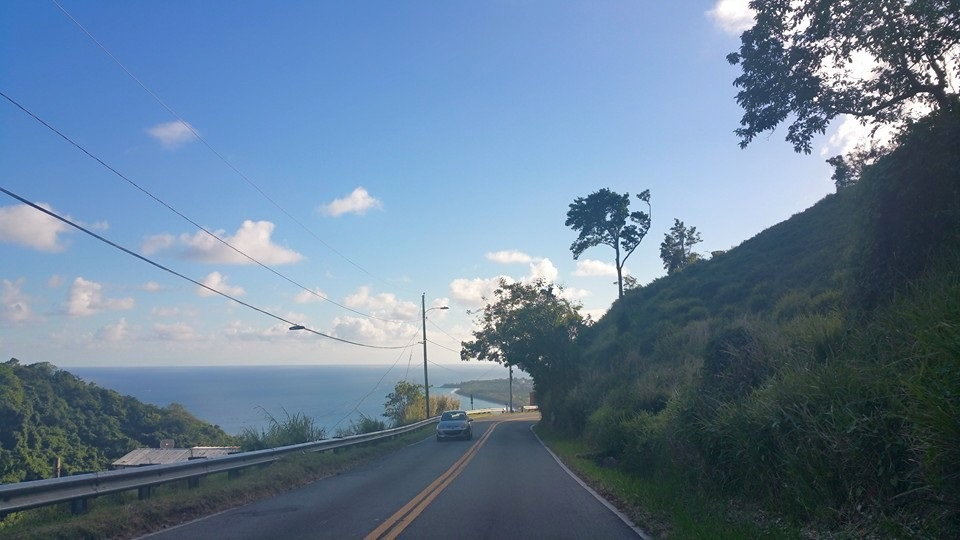
Heading south in Emajagua, Maunabo

== Major intersections ==
Municipality	Location	km	mi	Destinations	Notes
Maunabo	Emajagua	15.1	9.4	PR-760 – Maunabo, Patillas, Sector La Playa, Sector El Faro	Southern terminus of PR-901; the Ruta Panorámica continues toward Yabucoa via Quebrada Arenas–Talante
Maunabo	Emajagua	14.9– 14.8	9.3– 9.2	PR-53 north (Autopista José M. Dávila Monsanto) – Yabucoa	
Maunabo	Emajagua	14.5	9.0	PR-7760 – Bordaleza	
Maunabo	Emajagua	12.4– 12.3	7.7– 7.6	PR-53 south (Autopista José M. Dávila Monsanto) – Maunabo	
Yabucoa	Camino Nuevo	5.0	3.1	PR-9911 – Playa Lucía	
Yabucoa	Camino Nuevo	4.0	2.5	PR-9901 – Juan Martín	
Yabucoa	Camino Nuevo	3.3	2.1	To PR-53 (Autopista José M. Dávila Monsanto) / PR-9914 – Humacao	
Yabucoa	Juan Martín	3.0– 2.9	1.9– 1.8	PR-9914 east to PR-53 (Autopista José M. Dávila Monsanto) – Humacao	
Yabucoa	Juan Martín	1.1	0.68	PR-3 – Humacao, Maunabo	
Yabucoa	Yabucoa barrio-pueblo	0.0	0.0	PR-9910 (Calle Cristóbal Colón) to PR-182 – Yabucoa	Northern terminus of PR-901; the Ruta Panorámica continues toward Maunabo and San Lorenzo via Calabazas
1.000 mi = 1.609 km; 1.000 km = 0.621 mi

== See also ==
- 1953 Puerto Rico highway renumbering
