= Puerto Rico Highway 3 =

Highway in Puerto Rico

Highway 3
- Ruta 3

Route information
- Maintained by Puerto Rico DTPW
- Length: 160.7 km (99.9 mi)

Major junctions
- From: PR-1 in Salinas barrio-pueblo
- PR-54 in Guayama barrio-pueblo; PR-184 in Cacao Bajo; PR-901 in Juan Martín; PR-53 in Río Abajo; PR-31 in Mariana; PR-53 in Quebrada Vueltas; PR-66 / PR-187 in Guzmán Abajo; PR-188 / PR-9188 in Canóvanas; PR-26 / PR-66 in San Antón; PR-181 in Sabana Llana Sur
- To: PR-1 in Hato Rey Sur

Location
- Country: United States
- Territory: Puerto Rico
- Municipalities: Salinas, Guayama, Arroyo, Patillas, Maunabo, Yabucoa, Humacao, Naguabo, Ceiba, Fajardo, Luquillo, Río Grande, Loíza, Canóvanas, Carolina, San Juan

Highway system
- Roads in Puerto Rico; List
← PR-2	→ PR-5
← PR-2R	PR-3R	→ PR-14R

Puerto Rico Highway 3 (PR-3) at nearly 100 miles long, is the second-longest highway on Puerto Rico (after PR-2). It connects the San Juan neighborhood of Río Piedras to downtown Salinas indirectly around the eastern coast of the island. Highway 3 ranges from a three lane urban avenue in San Juan to a one lane rural road past Fajardo. While other roads connect San Juan, it runs the coastline of Puerto Rico east of San Juan, beginning in Río Piedras near Santurce (where it is known as the Avenida 65 de Infantería) and goes to Fajardo where it goes south paralleling the coastline to Humacao and Maunabo. It goes up to a mountain-scenic route and goes west to Salinas, where it meets PR-1.

== Route description ==
=== San Juan to Río Grande ===
PR-3 begins at an intersection with PR-1 in San Juan as the three lane 65th Infantry Regiment Avenue. Heading east through San Juan, Highway 3 functions as an urban boulevard with both at-grade and grade-separated intersections becoming decidedly suburban in character past the PR-26/66 overpass near downtown Carolina. Recently, PR-66 was opened and it has controlled the high traffic on PR-3.

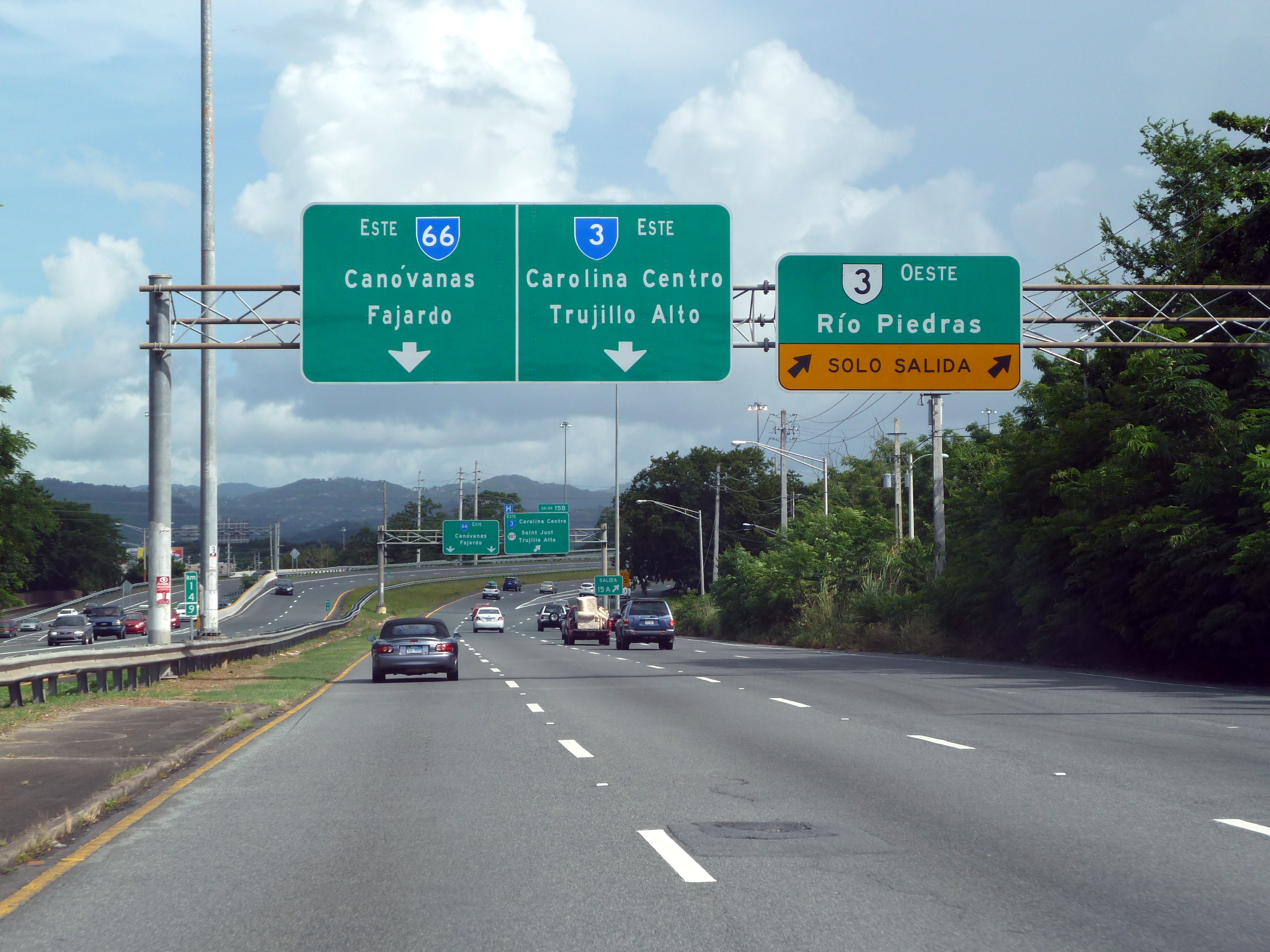
Exit for Río Piedras, Puerto Rico Highway 3 west

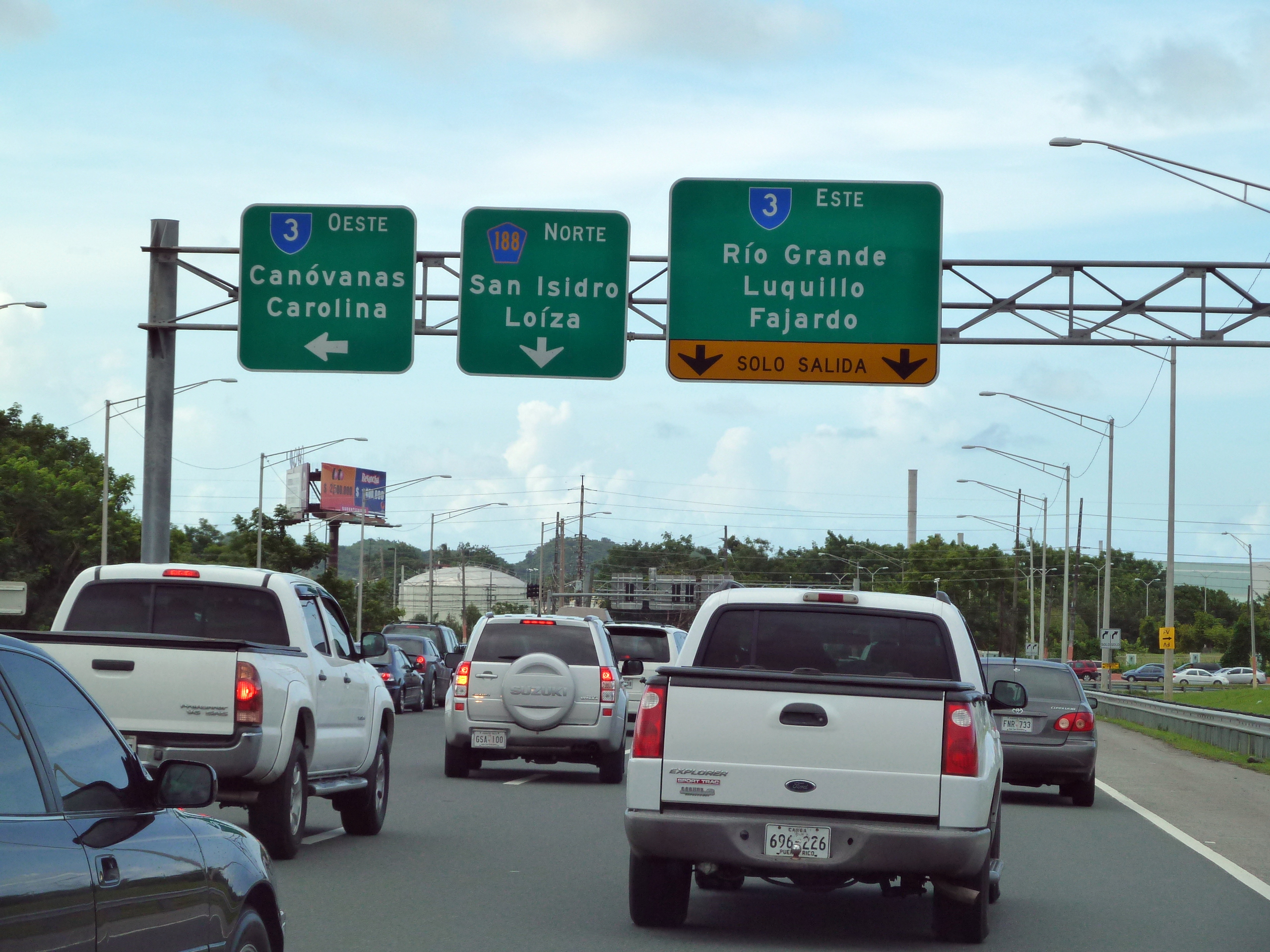
Puerto Rico Highway 3 and Puerto Rico Highway 188

=== Río Grande to Fajardo ===
It is a divided highway to Fajardo, and the only main highway connecting Fajardo to Río Grande. In Fajardo, PR-53 begins and PR-3 becomes a one-lane per direction rural road, and keeps that way for the rest of its length, though there are some minor divided segments in Humacao near Junquito, a very small segment near Patagonia (close to its intersection with PR-30) and another segment in Arroyo and Guayama for about nearly 10 kilometers.

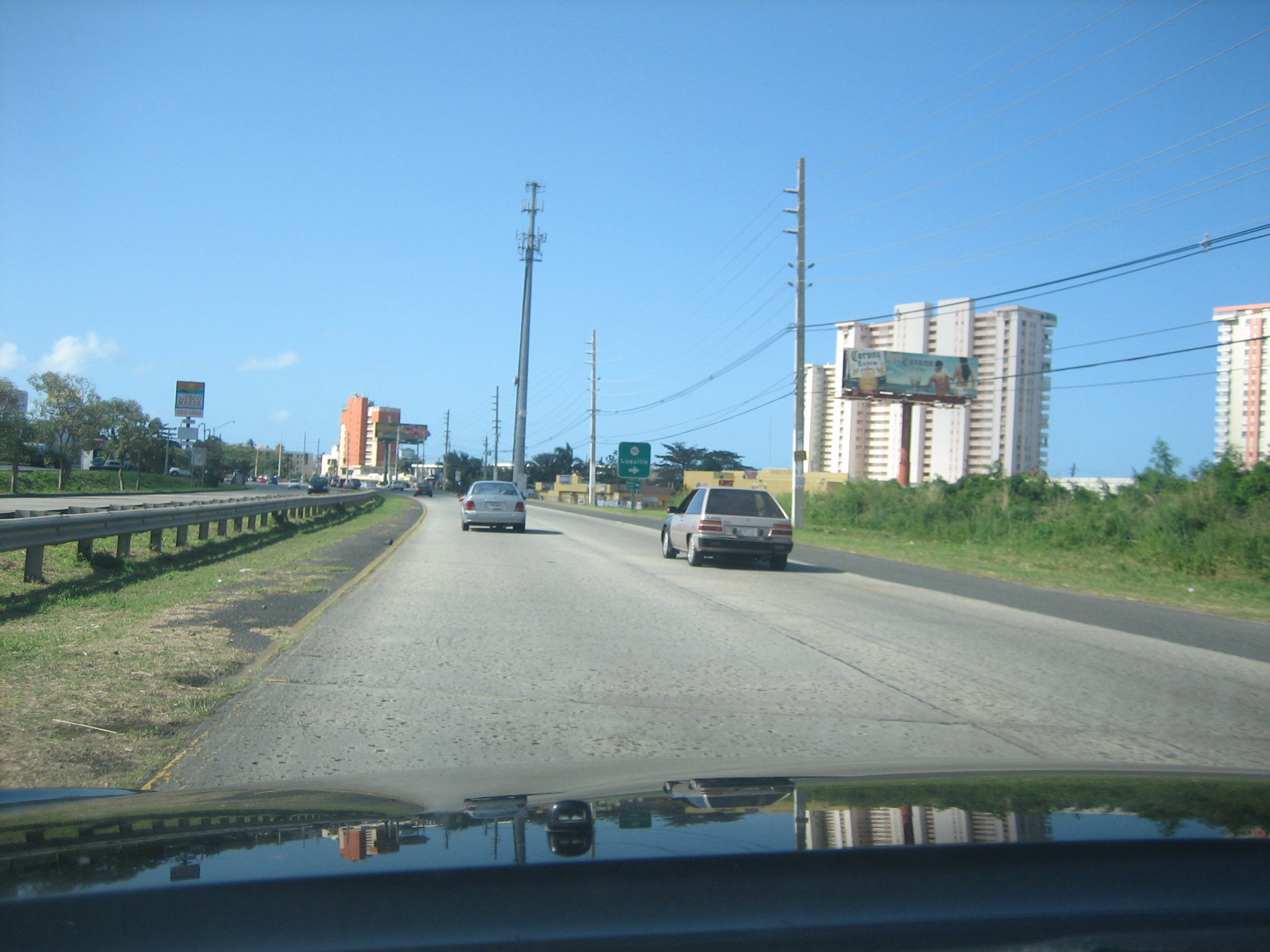
PR-3 in Luquillo

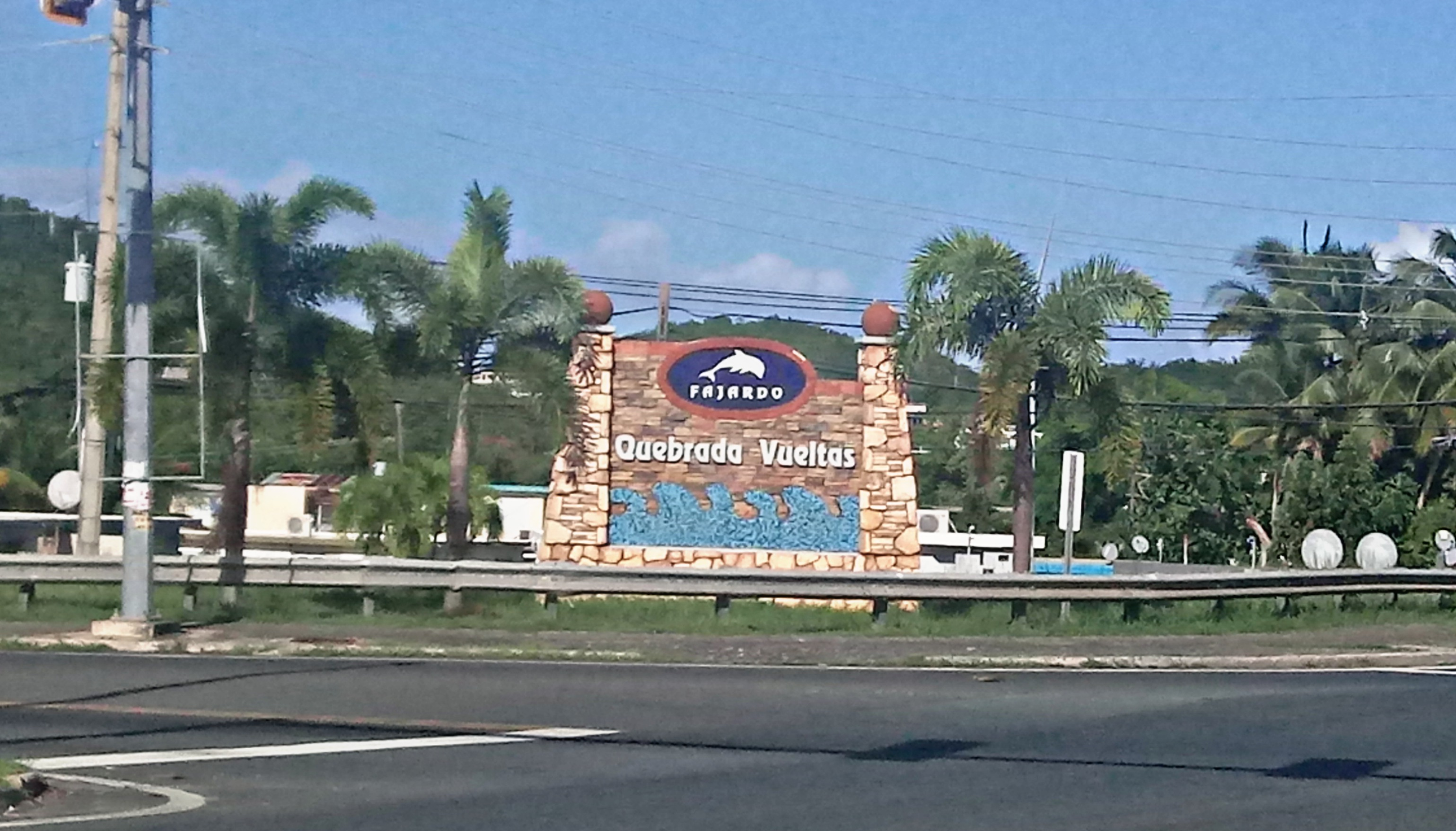
PR-3 in Fajardo

=== Municipalities served ===
The following are the municipalities through which PR-3 passes:

- San Juan
- Carolina
- Canóvanas
- Loíza
- Río Grande
- Luquillo
- Fajardo
- Ceiba
- Naguabo
- Humacao
- Yabucoa
- Maunabo
- Patillas
- Arroyo
- Guayama
- Salinas

Loíza is the only coastal municipality not served by PR-3 in its length through the east shore until its intersection with PR-1 in Salinas. PR-188 serves as the main artery from the highway to Loíza. The remaining coasts of Puerto Rico (west of San Juan and west of Salinas) are served by PR-1 (West Salinas, Santa Isabel, Juana Díaz and East Ponce) and PR-2 (the rest of the coastline though some municipalities are not directly served). In Maunabo and south Yabucoa, PR-3 is not the main "at-grade" artery since it goes up in the mountains. PR-901 is the main at grade road in this segment of about 10 kilometers.

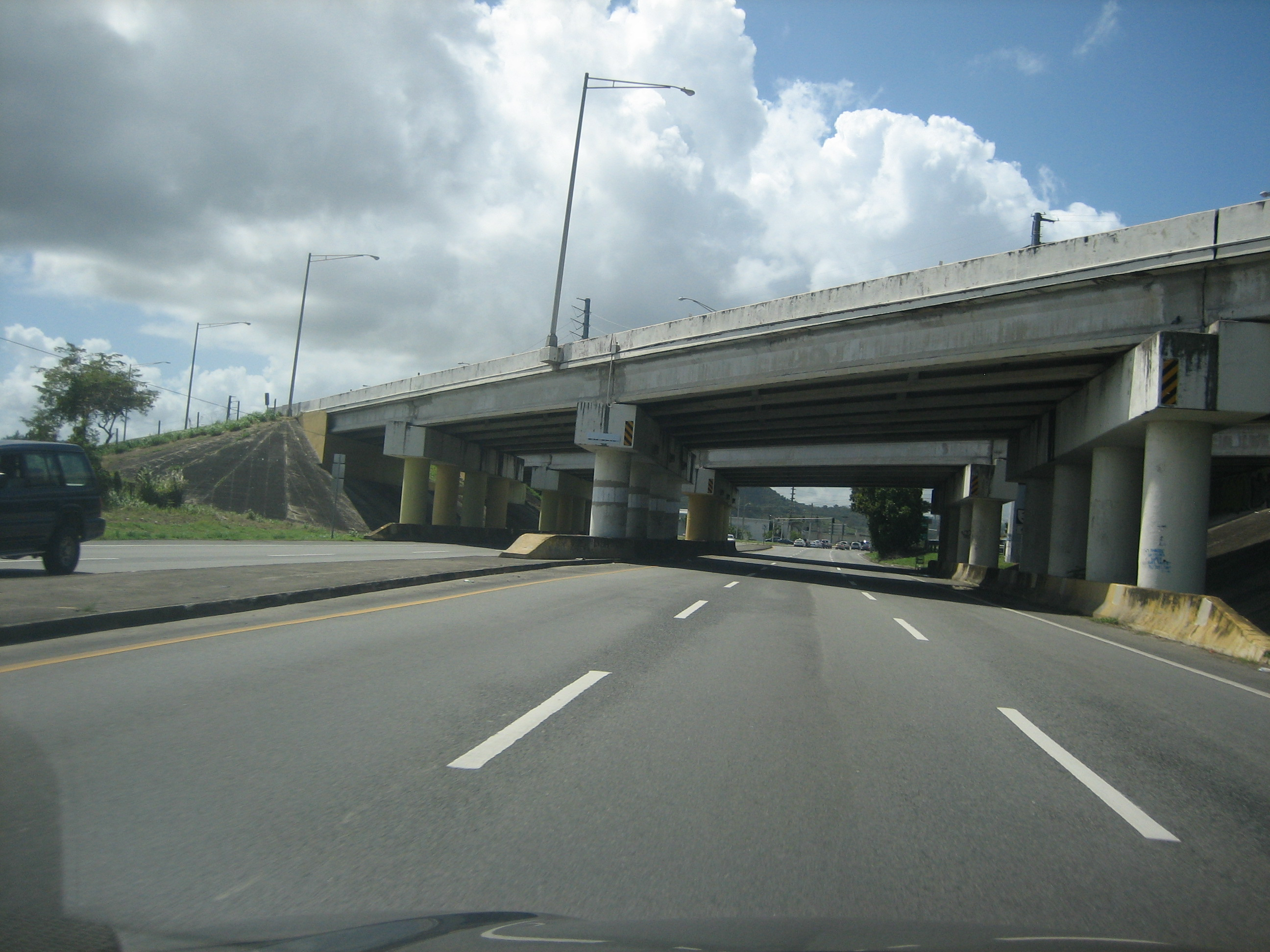
PR-3 in Humacao close to PR-53 (bridge)

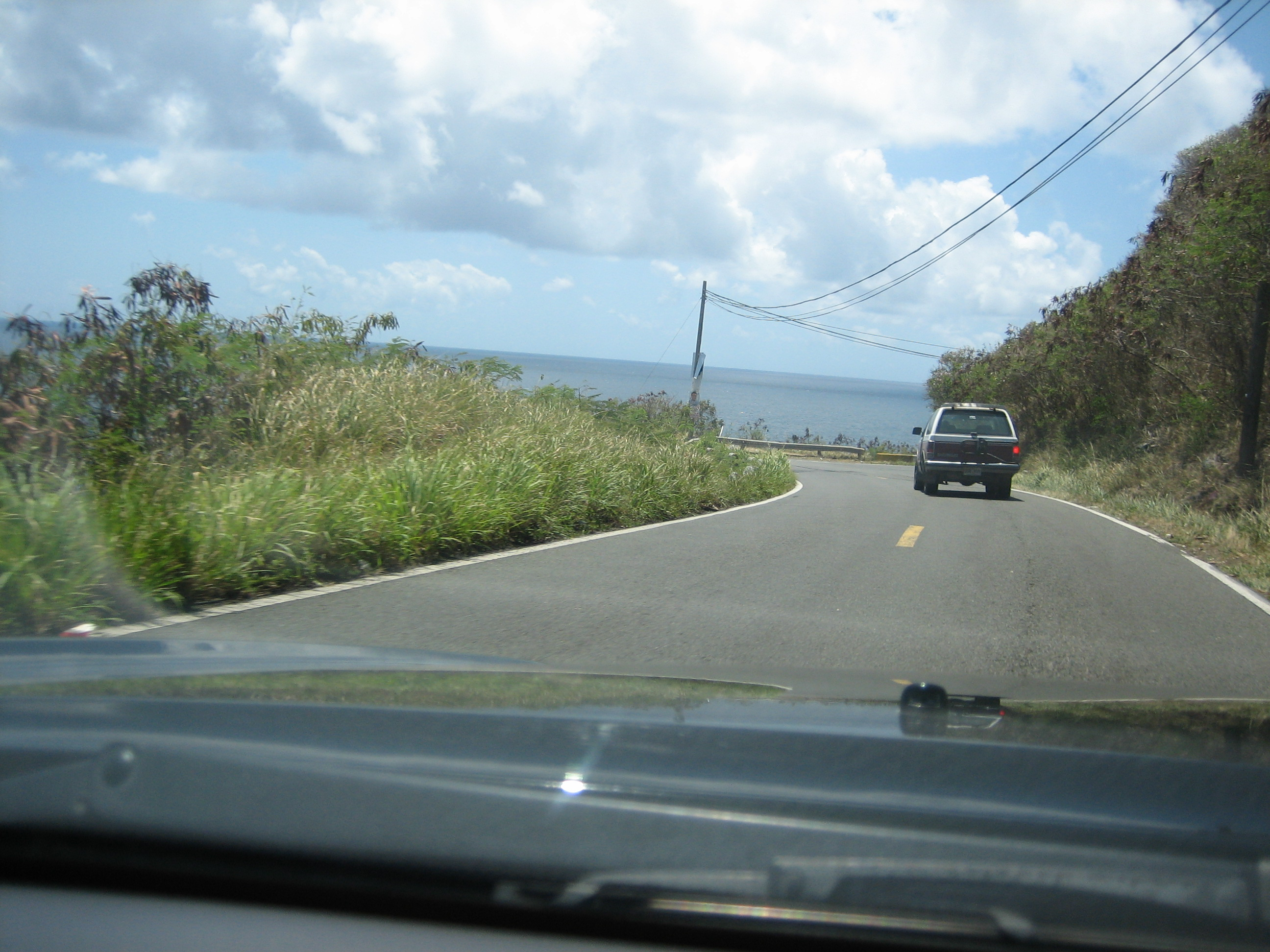
PR-3 as a rural road in Patillas, several hundred feet above the sea

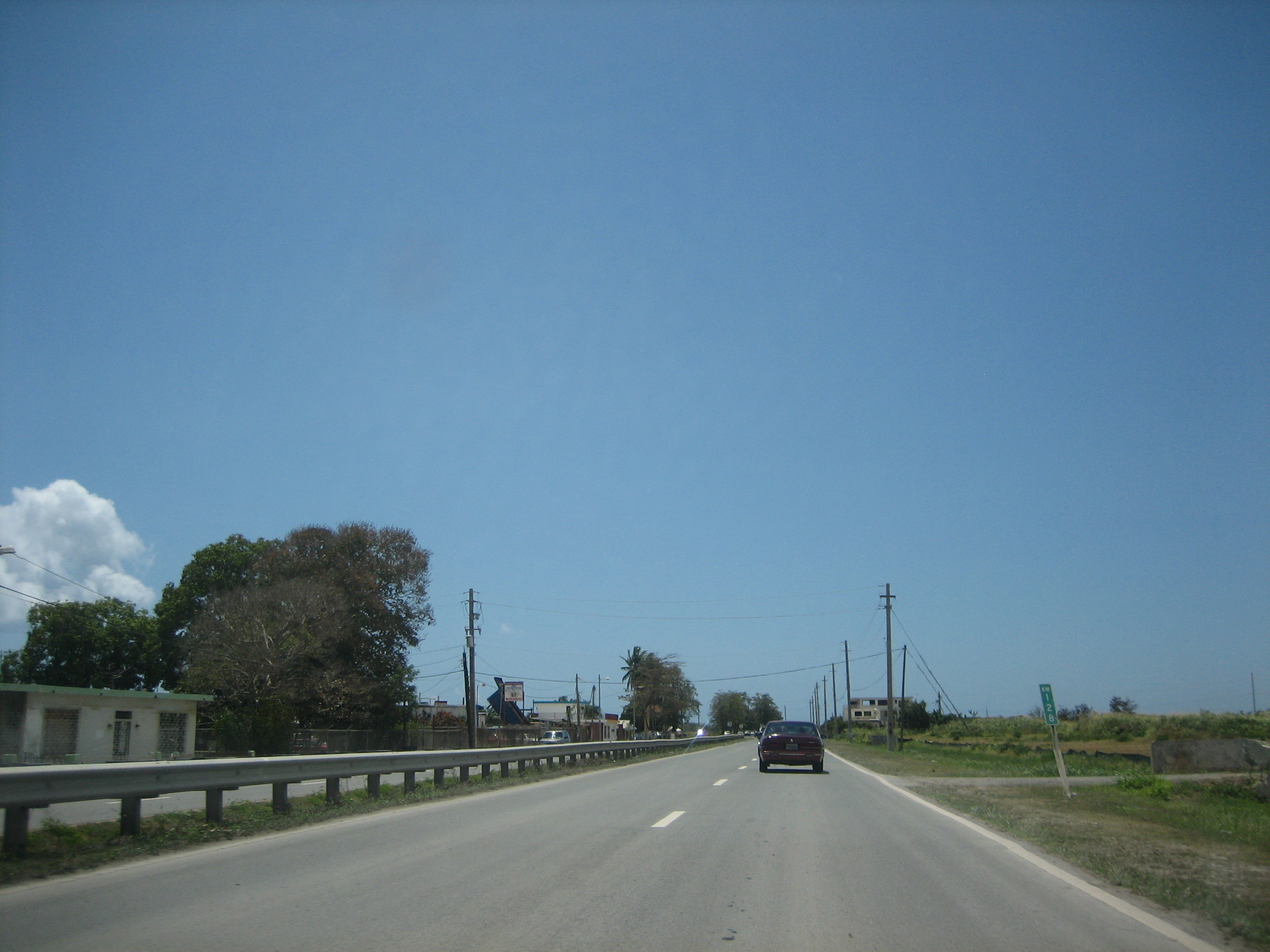
PR-3 in Arroyo near Guayama

=== Puerto Rico Highway 53 ===
Just like PR-22 parallels PR-2 and PR-52 parallels PR-1, PR-53 is the toll highway which parallels PR-3 and they have several exit intersections. Yet, PR-53 has not been completed and PR-3 serves as the main road in the southeastern part of Puerto Rico going from Yabucoa to Guayama, though PR-901 serves as a primary road (because it is shorter through it) between Yabucoa and Maunabo.

== Major intersections ==
Municipality	Location	km	mi	Exit	Destinations	Notes
Salinas	Salinas barrio-pueblo	160.7	99.9		PR-1 – Ponce, San Juan	Counterclockwise terminus of PR-3; northbound access via Calle Palmer
Salinas	Aguirre	159.7	99.2		PR-180 (Avenida Pedro Albizu Campos) – Salinas	
Guayama	Guayama barrio-pueblo	140.3	87.2		PR-54 (Avenida Pedro Albizu Campos) – Salinas, Ponce, San Juan, Arroyo	
Guayama	Guayama barrio-pueblo	139.0	86.4		PR-15 north (Calle Calimano Martínez) – Cayey	One-way street; northbound access via Calle Ashford
Guayama	Guayama barrio-pueblo	138.0	85.7		PR-744 south – Machete, Salinas	
Guayama	Algarrobo	135.3– 135.2	84.1– 84.0		PR-54 south (Avenida Pedro Albizu Campos) / PR-748 – Guayama	
Arroyo	Guásimas	133.4	82.9		PR-178 (Carretera Monseñor José Antonio Colón Ferrer) – Arroyo	
Arroyo	Arroyo barrio-pueblo–Pitahaya– Palmas tripoint	132.2	82.1		PR-178 (Calle Pintor Samuel B. Morse) / PR-753 – Arroyo, Pitahaya	
Arroyo	Palmas	129.0	80.2		PR-53 east (Autopista José M. Dávila Monsanto) – Maunabo	
Patillas	Cacao Bajo	127.0– 126.9	78.9– 78.9		PR-184 north – Cayey	
Patillas	Patillas barrio-pueblo	125.5	78.0		PR-181 north (Calle Jesús T. Piñero) – San Lorenzo	One-way street
Patillas	Pollos	122.4	76.1		PR-53 west (Autopista José M. Dávila Monsanto) – Arroyo	
Maunabo	Talante–Emajagua– Maunabo barrio-pueblo tripoint	108.0	67.1		PR-760 east (Avenida John F. Kennedy) to PR-901 (Carretera Ernesto Carrasquillo) – Yabucoa	
Maunabo	Maunabo barrio-pueblo–Talante– Quebrada Arenas tripoint	106.9	66.4		PR-939 – Quebrada Arenas	Southern terminus of the Ruta Panorámica concurrency; the Ruta Panorámica continues toward Yabucoa via Emajagua–Camino Nuevo
Yabucoa	Juan Martín	99.0	61.5		PR-182 (Ruta Panorámica) – Yabucoa	Northern terminus of the Ruta Panorámica concurrency; the Ruta Panorámica continues toward San Lorenzo
Yabucoa	Juan Martín	97.8– 97.7	60.8– 60.7		PR-901 (Ruta Panorámica) – Yabucoa	
Humacao	Candelero Arriba–Candelero Abajo– Buena Vista tripoint	86.3	53.6		PR-906 east (Avenida Luis M. Castro Díaz) to PR-53 (Autopista Dr. José Celso Barbosa) – Yabucoa, Fajardo	PR-53 exits 35 and 35A
Humacao	Cataño	83.0	51.6		PR-909 west to PR-30 (Expreso Cruz Ortiz Stella) – Yabucoa, Las Piedras, Mariana	PR-30 exit 28
Humacao	Cataño	82.5– 82.4	51.3– 51.2		PR-908 west (Carretera Profesor Gilberto Rivera Ortiz) to PR-30 (Expreso Cruz Ortiz Stella) – Las Piedras, Yabucoa	PR-30 exit 26
Humacao	Humacao barrio-pueblo	82.3	51.1		PR-3R east (Bulevar Nicanor Vázquez) – Ceiba	
Humacao	Humacao barrio-pueblo	81.7	50.8		PR-198 west (Avenida Cruz Ortiz Stella) to PR-924 (Calle Dufresne) – Las Piedras	One-way street
Humacao	Humacao barrio-pueblo	80.9	50.3		PR-3R south (Bulevar Nicanor Vázquez) – Yabucoa	
Humacao	Río Abajo	80.5	50.0		PR-60 west (Expreso Dionisio Casillas) – Caguas	
Humacao	Río Abajo	79.4– 79.3	49.3– 49.3		PR-53 (Autopista Dr. José Celso Barbosa) – Yabucoa, Fajardo	PR-53 exit 31; partial cloverleaf interchange
Naguabo	Río Santiago	69.0	42.9		Puente No. 122	
Naguabo	Húcares	68.2	42.4		PR-192 – Naguabo	
Naguabo	Mariana	63.9– 63.8	39.7– 39.6		PR-31 (Carretera Carmen Delia Dipiní Piñero) – Naguabo	
Ceiba	Quebrada Seca	59.6– 59.5	37.0– 37.0		PR-53 (Autopista Dr. José Celso Barbosa) – Fajardo, Humacao	PR-53 exit 10; diamond interchange
Fajardo	Quebrada Vueltas	48.0	29.8		PR-194 – Fajardo	Roundabout
Fajardo	Quebrada Vueltas	47.9	29.8		PR-53 south (Autopista Dr. José Celso Barbosa) – Humacao	
Fajardo	Fajardo barrio-pueblo	46.4	28.8	—	PR-195 (Calle Garrido Morales) – Fajardo	Diamond interchange
Fajardo	Quebrada Fajardo	43.7	27.2		PR-194 east (Avenida General Antonio Valero de Bernabé) / PR-940 – Fajardo	
Luquillo	Luquillo barrio-pueblo	38.1	23.7	—	PR-193 / PR-992 – Luquillo, Sabana	Diamond interchange
Luquillo	Mata de Plátano	36.0	22.4	—	PR-193 – Balneario de Luquillo	Diamond interchange
Río Grande	Mameyes II	31.4	19.5		PR-191 – El Yunque National Forest, Palmer	
Río Grande	Guzmán Abajo	25.7– 25.6	16.0– 15.9		PR-186 – Guzmán Arriba	
Río Grande	Guzmán Abajo	25.1	15.6	25	PR-66 west (Autopista Roberto Sánchez Vilella) to PR-956 – Guzmán Abajo, Carolina, San Juan PR-187 north – Río Grande	
Río Grande	Ciénaga Baja	24.2– 24.1	15.0– 15.0		To PR-187R (Calle Pimentel) – Río Grande	
Loíza	No major junctions					
Canóvanas	Canóvanas	18.9	11.7		PR-188 north – Loíza, San Isidro PR-9188 to PR-66 (Autopista Roberto Sánchez Vilella) – Carolina, San Juan, Río Grande, Fajardo	PR-66 exit 14; unsigned
Canóvanas	Canóvanas barrio-pueblo	17.3	10.7	—	PR-185 – Canóvanas, Juncos	Partial cloverleaf interchange
Carolina	Río Grande de Loíza	11.8– 11.6	7.3– 7.2	Puente Julia de Burgos		
Carolina	Martín González	10.5	6.5		PR-887 west – Carolina, Martín González, Saint Just	
Carolina	San Antón	8.4	5.2	—	PR-26 north (Expreso Román Baldorioty de Castro) / PR-Avenida Jesús M. Fragoso – San Juan, Aeropuerto PR-66 east (Autopista Roberto Sánchez Vilella) – Canóvanas, Fajardo	
Carolina	San Antón	7.9– 7.8	4.9– 4.8		PR-190 / PR-8887 – Carolina	
San Juan	Sabana Llana Sur–Sabana Llana Norte line	6.3	3.9	—	PR-8 north (Avenida Ramal Este) – San Juan, Aeropuerto, Hato Rey	Partial cloverleaf interchange
San Juan	Sabana Llana Sur–Sabana Llana Norte line	3.3	2.1		PR-47 (Calle De Diego) – Río Piedras	
San Juan	Sabana Llana Sur	2.5	1.6		PR-181 (Expreso Manuel Rivera Morales) – Trujillo Alto, San Juan, Aeropuerto, Hato Rey	Diamond interchange
San Juan	Sabana Llana Sur–Pueblo line	1.3	0.81		PR-27 north (Avenida José Celso Barbosa) – Río Piedras	
San Juan	Pueblo–Hato Rey Sur line	0.2	0.12	—	PR-25 north (Avenida Juan Ponce de León) – Río Piedras	
San Juan	Hato Rey Sur	0.0	0.0	—	PR-1 – Hato Rey, Caguas	Clockwise terminus of PR-3
1.000 mi = 1.609 km; 1.000 km = 0.621 mi: Concurrency terminus; Incomplete access

== Related route ==
Highway 3R
- Location: Humacao
- Length: 1.4 km (0.87 mi)

Puerto Rico Highway 3R (Spanish: Carretera Ramal 3, abbreviated Ramal PR-3 or PR-3R) is a bypass near downtown Humacao, Puerto Rico. This road is part of Nicanor Vázquez Boulevard. The entire route is located in Humacao barrio-pueblo, Humacao.

km	mi	Destinations	Notes
1.4	0.87	PR-3	Western terminus of Ramal PR-3; access to Yabucoa; unsigned
0.0	0.0	PR-3	Eastern terminus of Ramal PR-3; access to Fajardo
1.000 mi = 1.609 km; 1.000 km = 0.621 mi

== See also ==
- Interstate Highways in Puerto Rico
