= Maunabo barrio-pueblo =

Historical and administrative center (seat) of Maunabo, Puerto Rico

Maunabo barrio-pueblo Pueblo de Maunabo
- Municipality Seat
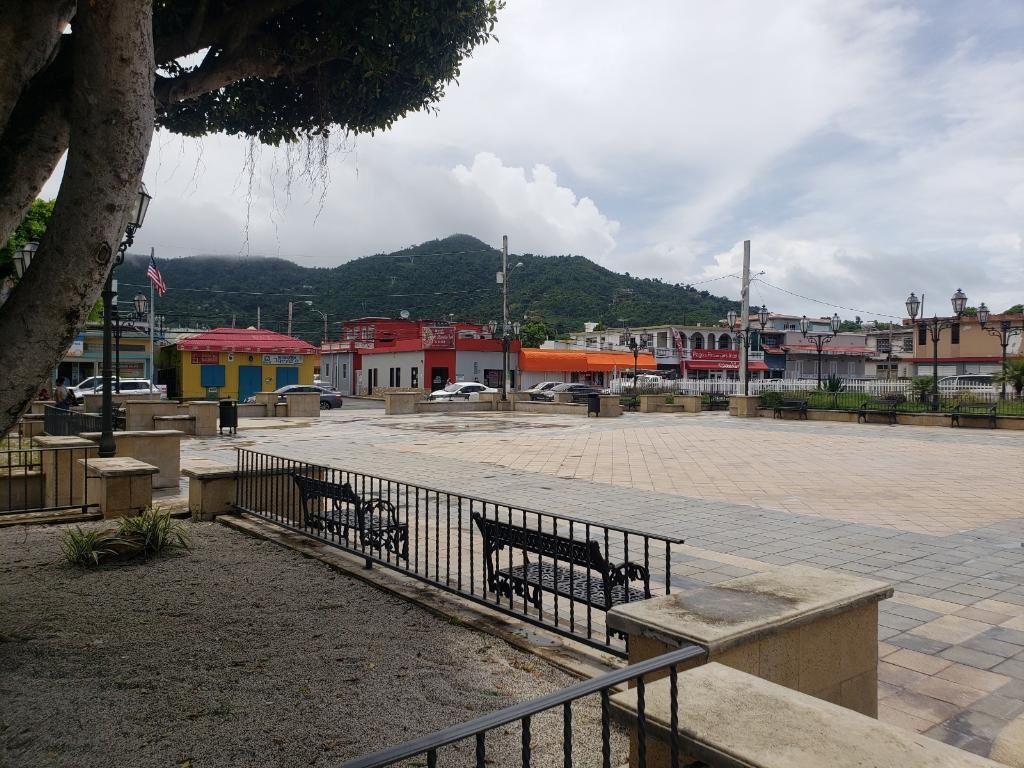
- Square (Plaza de recreo) of Maunabo barrio-pueblo

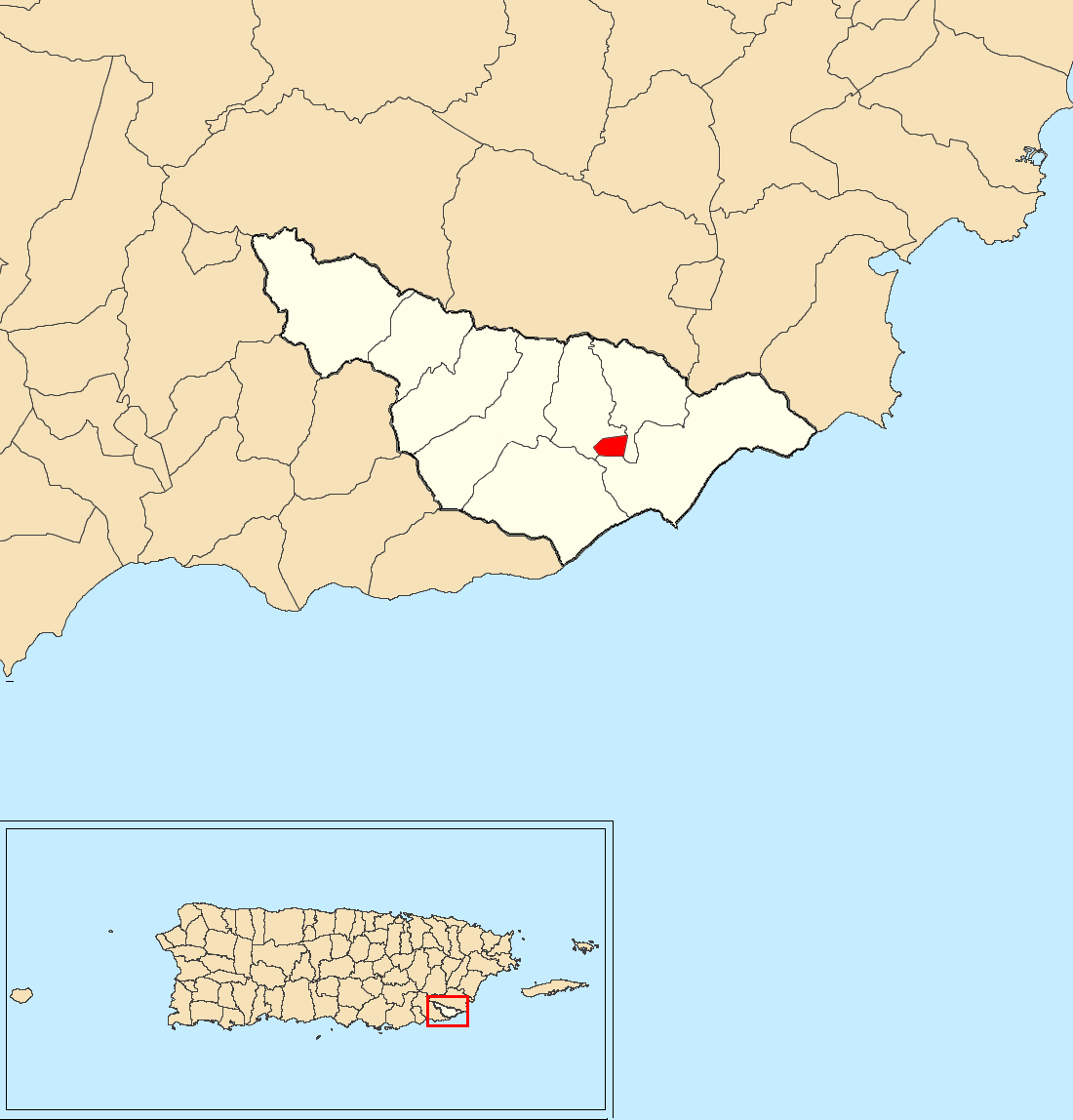
- Location of Maunabo barrio-pueblo within the municipality of Maunabo shown in red

- Location of Puerto Rico
- Coordinates: 18°00′28″N 65°54′03″W
- Commonwealth: Puerto Rico
- Municipality: Maunabo

Area
  - Total: 0.14 sq mi (0.36 km^{2})
  - Land: 0.14 sq mi (0.36 km^{2})
  - Water: 0 sq mi (0 km^{2})
- Elevation: 33 ft (10 m)

Population (2010)
  - Total: 317
  - Density: 2,264.3/sq mi (874.3/km^{2})
- Source: 2010 Census
- Time zone: UTC−4 (AST)
- ZIP Code: 00707
- Area code: 787/939

Maunabo barrio-pueblo is a barrio and the administrative center (seat) of Maunabo, a municipality of Puerto Rico. Its population in 2010 was 317.

As was customary in Spain, in Puerto Rico, the municipality has a barrio called pueblo which contains a central plaza, the municipal buildings (city hall), and a Catholic church. Fiestas patronales (patron saint festivals) are held in the central plaza every year.

== Description ==
Historically, the barrio was divided into east and west with its eastern limit beginning at Puerto Rico Highway 3 in Quebrada Arenas, (at Kilometer 108.92) and its western limit beginning where Quebrada Arenas and Emajagua meet on PR-3, at (Kilometer 110.03).

== The central plaza and its church ==
The central plaza, or square, is a place in the barrio-pueblo for official and unofficial recreational events and a place where people can gather and socialize from dusk to dawn. The Laws of the Indies, Spanish law, which regulated life in Puerto Rico in the early 19th century, stated the plaza's purpose was for "the parties" (celebrations, festivities) (Spanish: a propósito para las fiestas), and that the square should be proportionally large enough for the number of neighbors (Spanish: grandeza proporcionada al número de vecinos). These Spanish regulations also stated that the streets nearby should be comfortable portals for passersby, protecting them from the elements: sun and rain.

Located across the central plaza in Maunabo barrio-pueblo is the Parroquia San Isidro Labrador, a Roman Catholic church.

== History ==
Maunabo barrio-pueblo was in Spain's gazetteers until Puerto Rico was ceded by Spain in the aftermath of the Spanish–American War under the terms of the Treaty of Paris of 1898 and became an unincorporated territory of the United States. In 1899, the United States Department of War conducted a census of Puerto Rico finding that the population of Maunabo Pueblo was 1,277.

The barrio-pueblo was called Pueblo until it was referred to as "barrio-pueblo", starting with the 1990 US Census.

Historical population
Census	Pop.	Note	%±
1900	1,277		—
1910	952		−25.5%
1920	908		−4.6%
1930	1,117		23.0%
1940	1,255		12.4%
1950	1,241		−1.1%
1960	1,027		−17.2%
1970	0		−100.0%
1980	721		—
1990	660		−8.5%
2000	395		−40.2%
2010	317		−19.7%
U.S. Decennial Census; 1899 (shown as 1900) 1910-1930; 1930-1950 1980-2000 2010

== Gallery ==
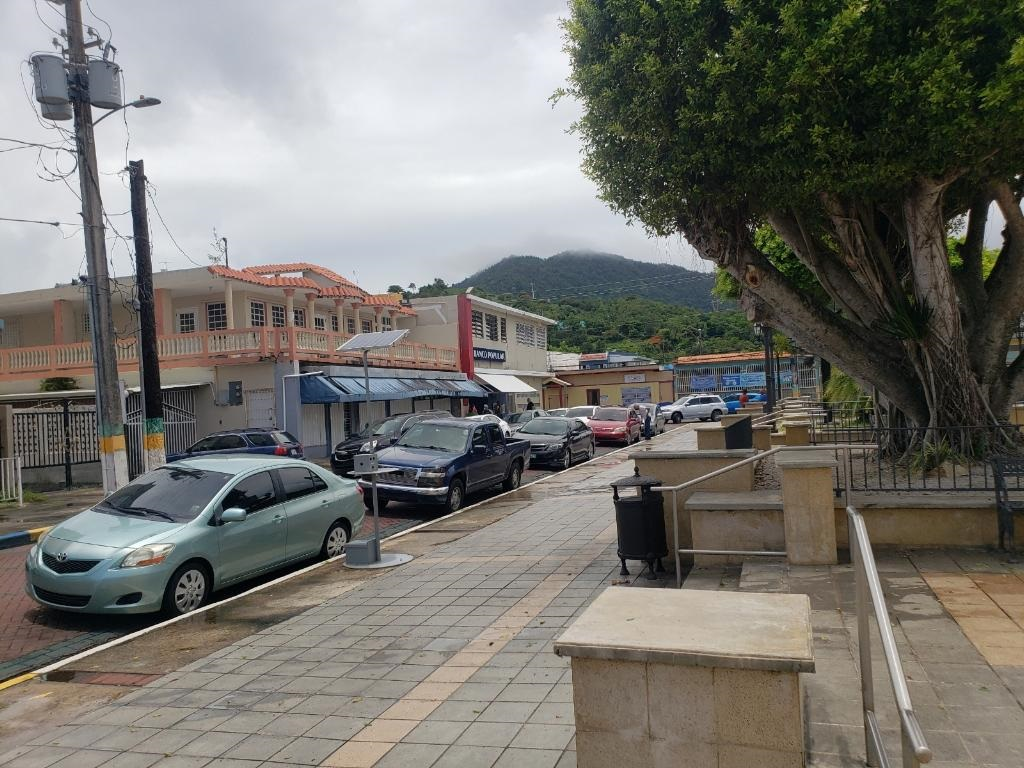
Cars parked around the square (plaza de recreo) of Maunabo barrio-pueblo

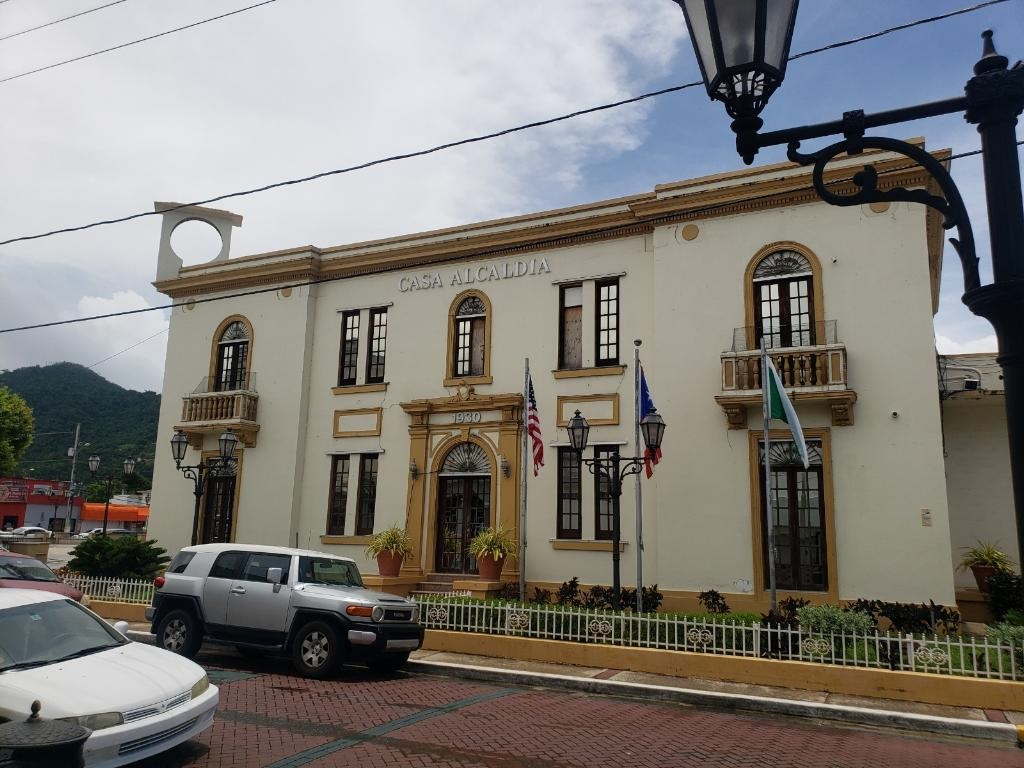
Casa Alcaldía with the American, Puerto Rican and Maunabo flags in front, in Maunaba barrio-pueblo

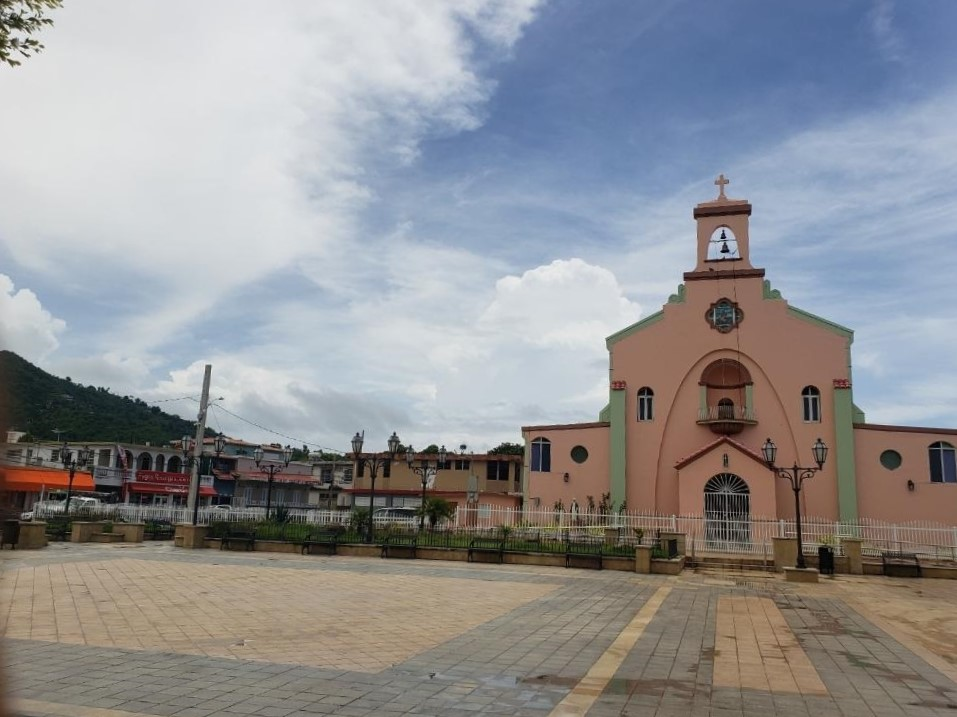
View of the Catholic church from the plaza, in Maunabo barrio-pueblo

== See also ==
- List of communities in Puerto Rico
