= Talante =

Barrio of Maunabo, Puerto Rico

- Barrio
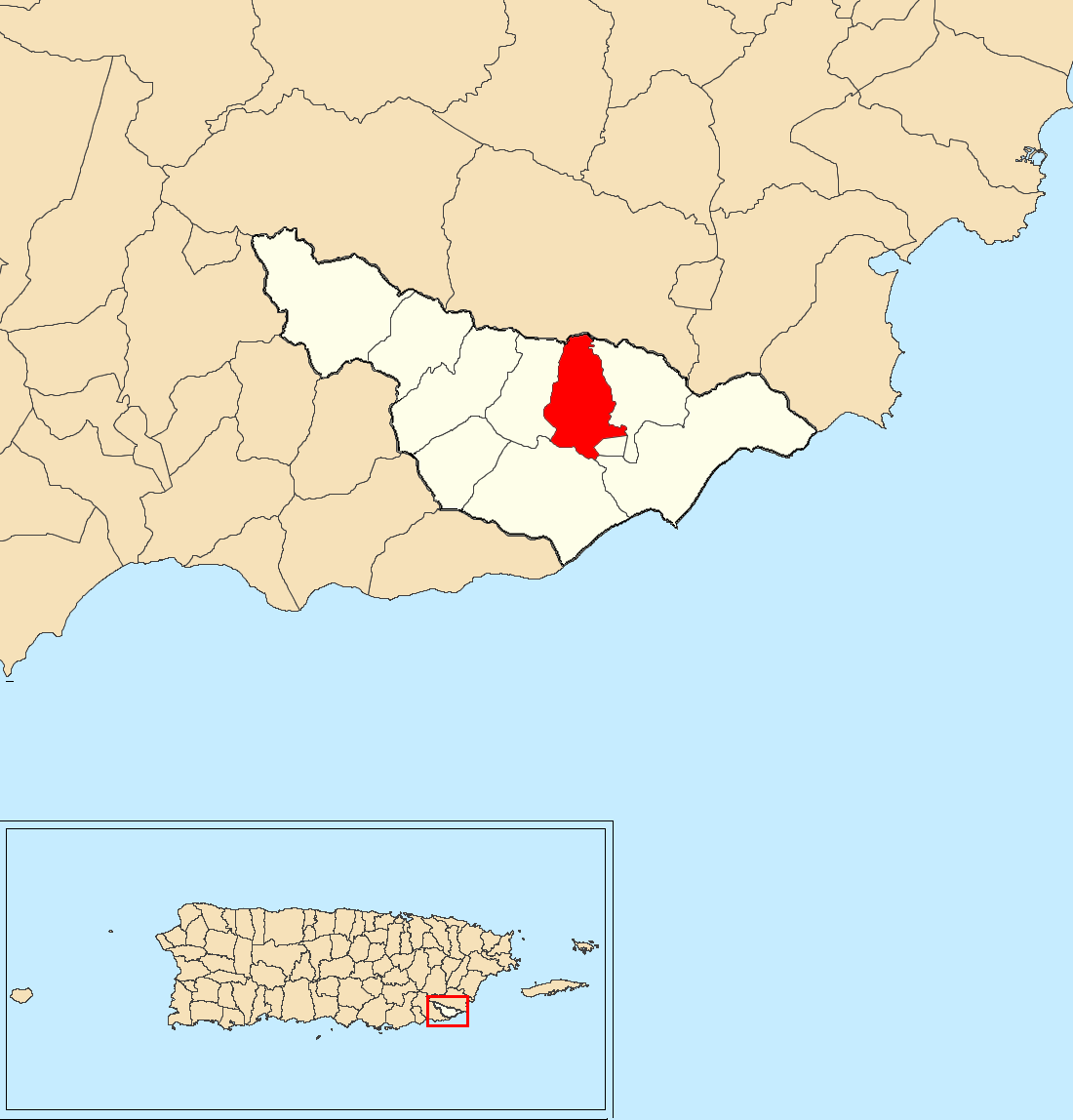
- Location of Talante within the municipality of Maunabo shown in red

- Location of Puerto Rico
- Coordinates: 18°01′38″N 65°54′34″W
- Commonwealth: Puerto Rico
- Municipality: Maunabo

Area
  - Total: 1.59 sq mi (4.1 km^{2})
  - Land: 1.59 sq mi (4.1 km^{2})
  - Water: 0 sq mi (0 km^{2})
- Elevation: 69 ft (21 m)

Population (2010)
  - Total: 1,381
  - Density: 868.6/sq mi (335.4/km^{2})
- Source: 2010 Census
- Time zone: UTC−4 (AST)
- ZIP Code: 00707
- Area code: 787/939

Talante is a barrio in the municipality of Maunabo, Puerto Rico. Its population in 2010 was 1,381.

== History ==
Talante was in Spain's gazetteers until Puerto Rico was ceded by Spain in the aftermath of the Spanish–American War under the terms of the Treaty of Paris of 1898 and became an unincorporated territory of the United States. In 1899, the United States Department of War conducted a census of Puerto Rico finding that the combined population of Talante and Quebrada Arenas barrios was 1,140.

Historical population
Census	Pop.	Note	%±
1910	436		—
1920	571		31.0%
1930	830		45.4%
1940	833		0.4%
1950	1,098		31.8%
1960	1,076		−2.0%
1970	615		−42.8%
1980	716		16.4%
1990	845		18.0%
2000	1,139		34.8%
2010	1,381		21.2%
U.S. Decennial Census; 1900 (N/A) 1910-1930; 1930-1950 1980-2000 2010

== See also ==
- List of communities in Puerto Rico
