= Quebrada Arenas, Maunabo, Puerto Rico =

Barrio of Puerto Rico

Quebrada Arenas
- Barrio
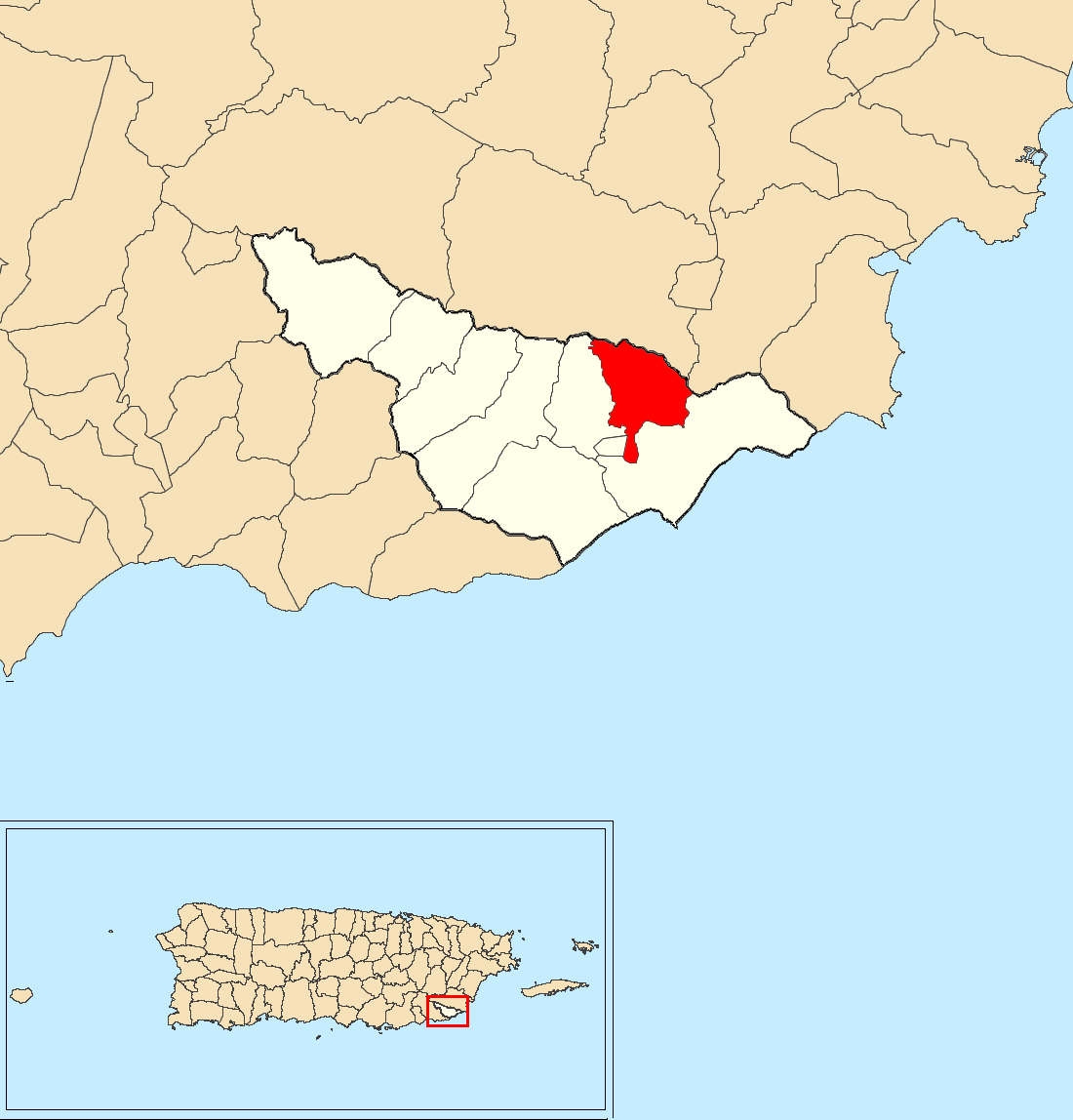
- Location of Quebrada Arenas within the municipality of Maunabo shown in red

- Location of Puerto Rico
- Coordinates: 18°01′32″N 65°53′45″W
- Commonwealth: Puerto Rico
- Municipality: Maunabo

Area
  - Total: 1.72 sq mi (4.5 km^{2})
  - Land: 1.72 sq mi (4.5 km^{2})
  - Water: 0 sq mi (0 km^{2})
- Elevation: 141 ft (43 m)

Population (2010)
  - Total: 1,667
  - Density: 969.2/sq mi (374.2/km^{2})
- Source: 2010 Census
- Time zone: UTC−4 (AST)
- ZIP Code: 00707
- Area code: 787/939

Quebrada Arenas is a barrio in the municipality of Maunabo, Puerto Rico. Its population in 2010 was 1,667.

== History ==
Cueva del Indio, a prehistoric rock art site which is now a public park, is located in Quebrada Arenas.

Quebrada Arenas was in Spain's gazetteers until Puerto Rico was ceded by Spain in the aftermath of the Spanish–American War under the terms of the Treaty of Paris of 1898 and became an unincorporated territory of the United States. In 1899, the United States Department of War conducted a census of Puerto Rico finding that the combined population of Quebrada Arenas and Talante barrios was 1,140.

Historical population
Census	Pop.	Note	%±
1910	940		—
1920	1,015		8.0%
1930	1,032		1.7%
1940	1,521		47.4%
1950	1,374		−9.7%
1960	1,015		−26.1%
1970	0		−100.0%
1980	2,389		—
1990	2,239		−6.3%
2000	2,060		−8.0%
2010	1,667		−19.1%
U.S. Decennial Census; 1900 (N/A) 1910-1930; 1930-1950 1980-2000 2010

== See also ==
- List of communities in Puerto Rico
