= Emajagua =

Barrio of Maunabo, Puerto Rico

- Barrio
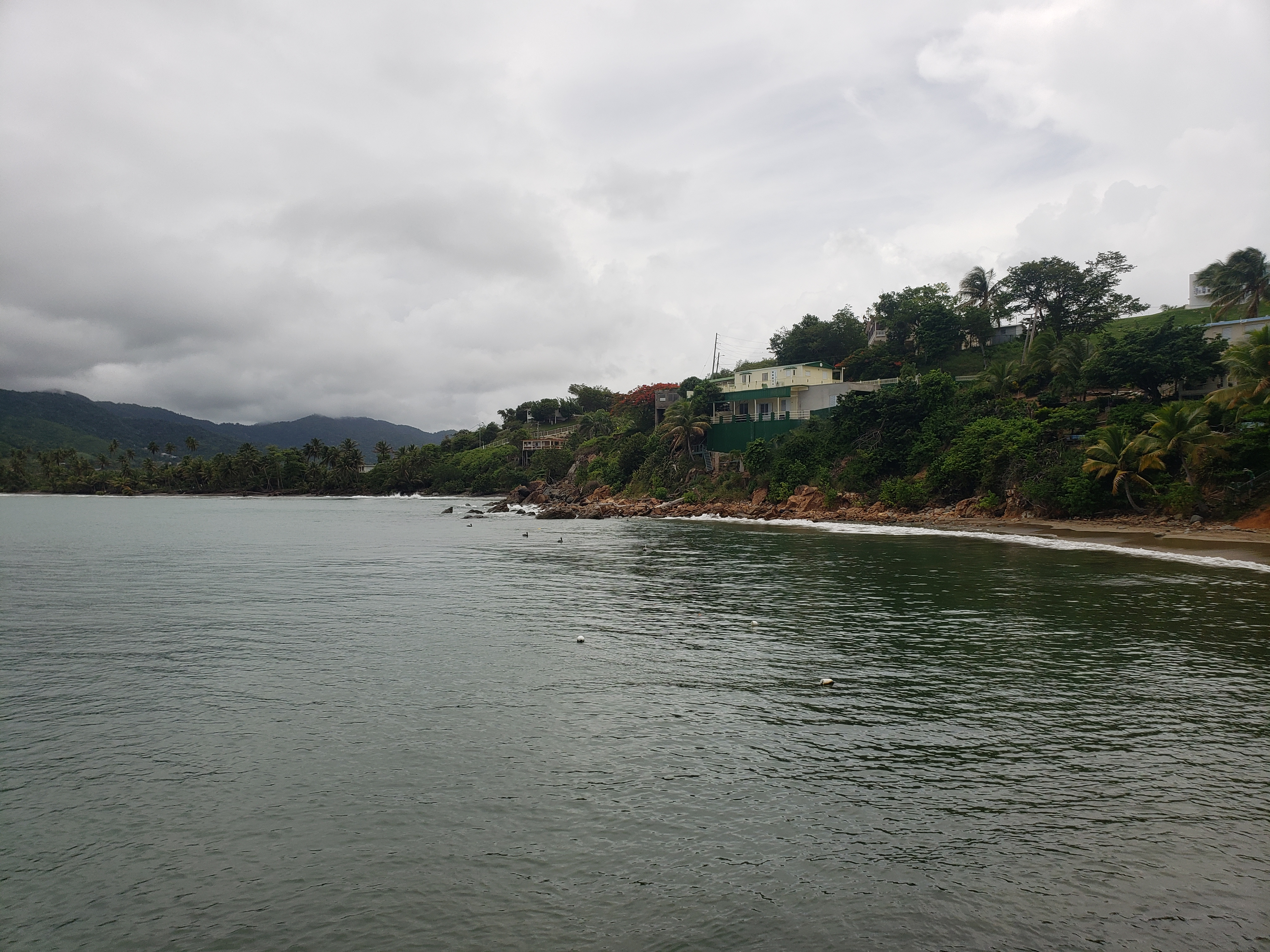
- Villa Pesquera in Emajagua from fishing pier

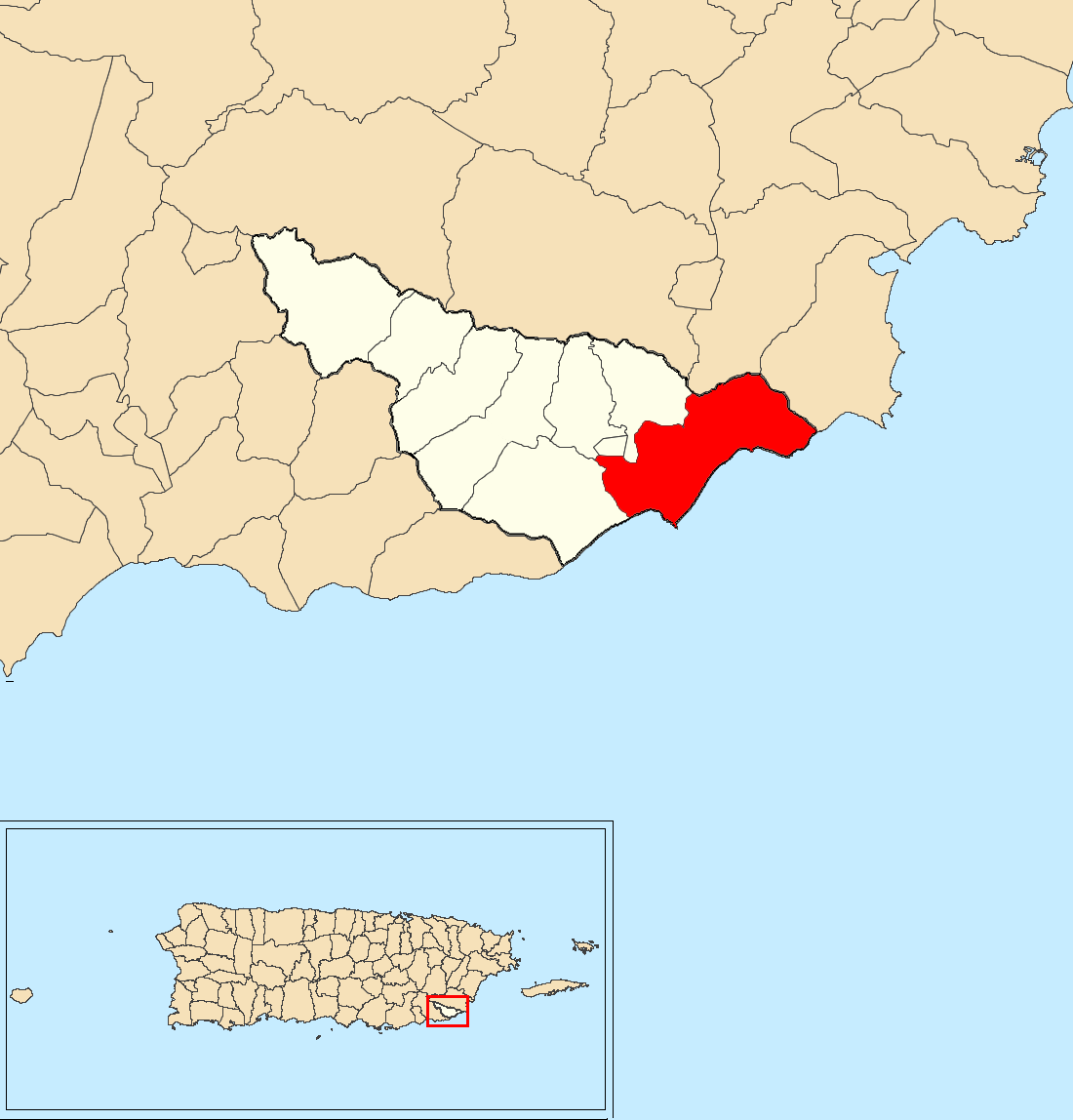
- Location of Emajagua within the municipality of Maunabo shown in red

- Location of Puerto Rico
- Coordinates: 18°00′18″N 65°52′37″W
- Commonwealth: Puerto Rico
- Municipality: Maunabo

Area
  - Total: 5.76 sq mi (14.9 km^{2})
  - Land: 4.14 sq mi (10.7 km^{2})
  - Water: 1.62 sq mi (4.2 km^{2})
- Elevation: 59 ft (18 m)

Population (2010)
  - Total: 4,538
  - Density: 1,096.1/sq mi (423.2/km^{2})
- Source: 2010 Census
- Time zone: UTC−4 (AST)
- ZIP Code: 00707
- Area code: 787/939

Emajagua is a barrio in the municipality of Maunabo, Puerto Rico with a population of 4,538 in 2010.

== Features ==
The Vicente Morales Lebrón Tunnel is in Emajagua.

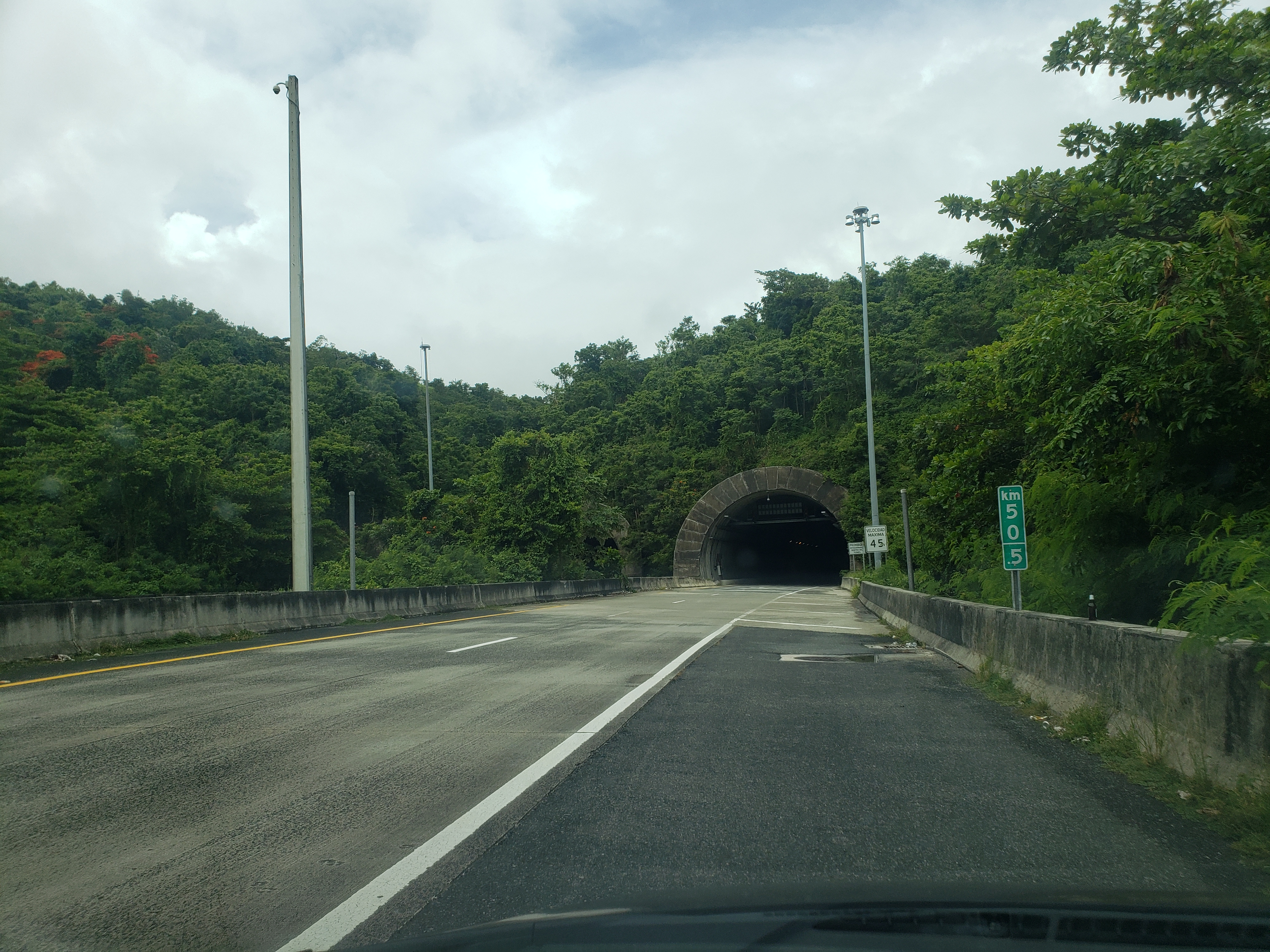
Túnel Vicente Morales Lebrón in Emajagua

== History ==
Emajagua was in Spain's gazetteers until Puerto Rico was ceded by Spain in the aftermath of the Spanish–American War under the terms of the Treaty of Paris of 1898 and became an unincorporated territory of the United States. In 1899, the United States Department of War conducted a census of Puerto Rico finding that the population of Emajagua barrio was 828.

Historical population
Census	Pop.	Note	%±
1900	828		—
1910	1,379		66.5%
1920	1,297		−5.9%
1930	1,469		13.3%
1940	1,840		25.3%
1950	2,357		28.1%
1960	2,586		9.7%
1970	0		−100.0%
1980	3,140		—
1990	3,719		18.4%
2000	4,515		21.4%
2010	4,538		0.5%
U.S. Decennial Census; 1899 (shown as 1900) 1910-1930; 1930-1950 1980-2000 2010

== Gallery ==
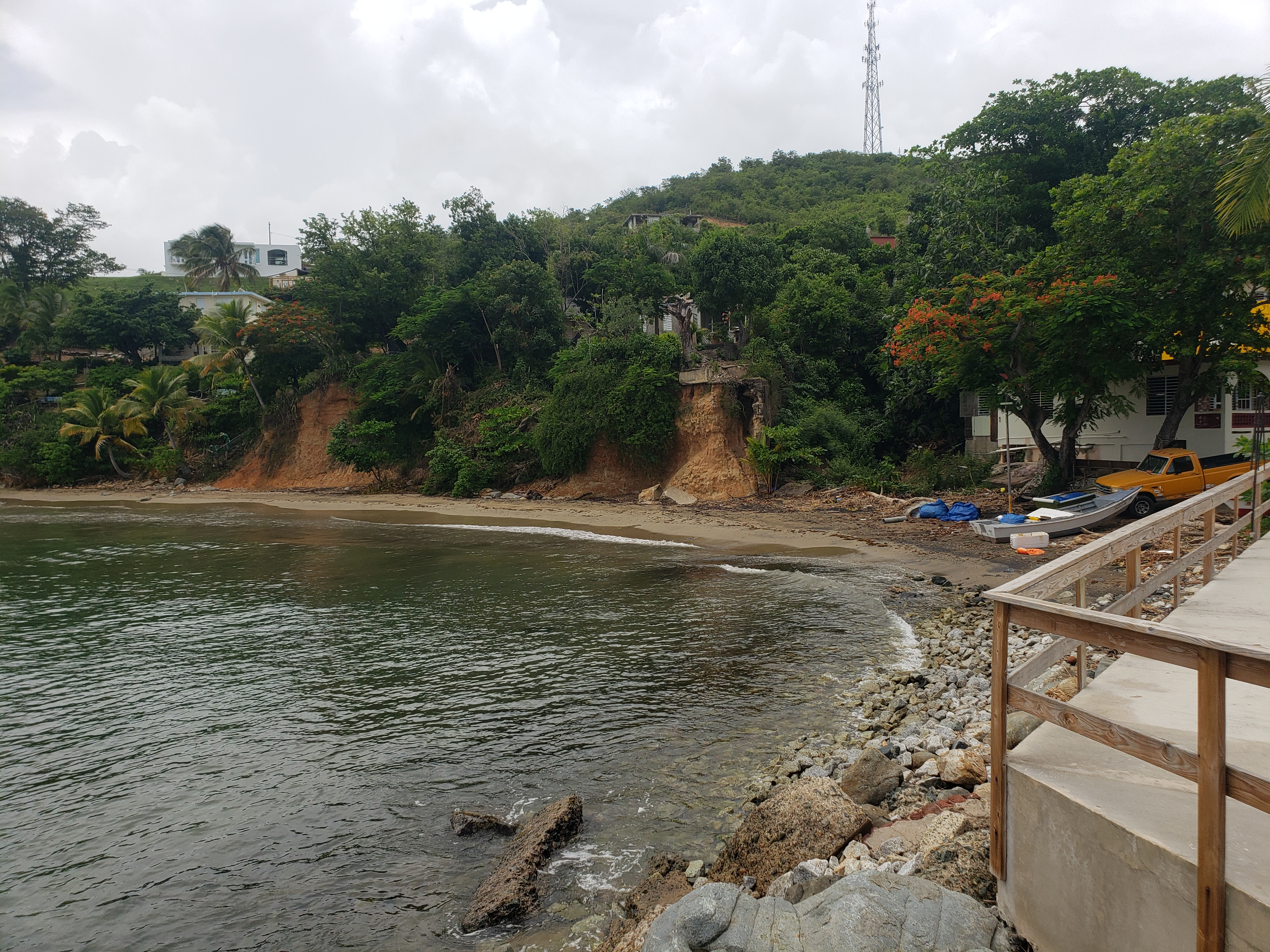
Villa Pesquera in Emajagua has a fishing pier.

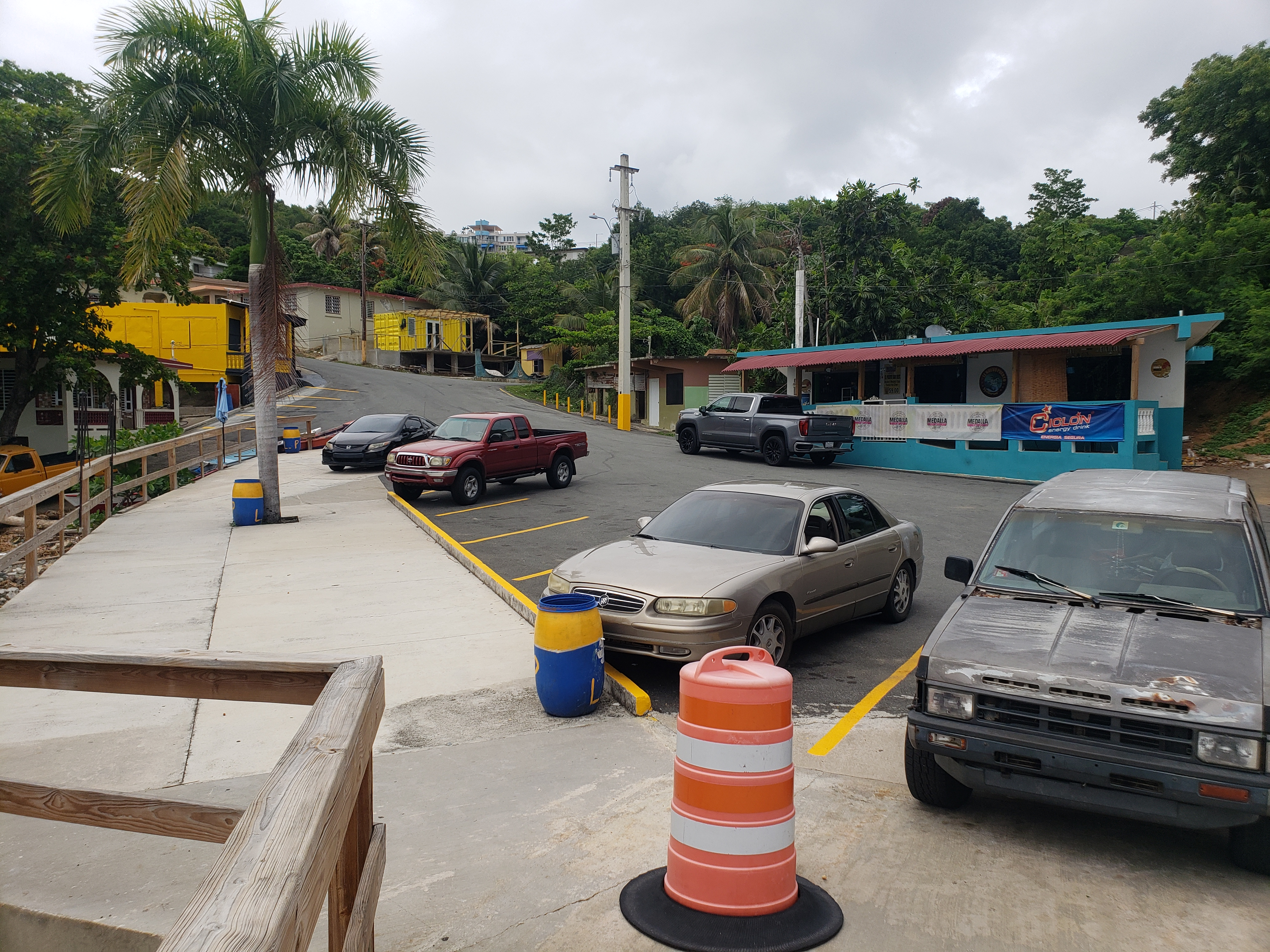
The Villa Pesquera parking area

== See also ==
- List of communities in Puerto Rico
