= Puerto Rico Highway 190 =

Highway in Puerto Rico

Highway 190
- Ruta 190

Route information
- Maintained by Puerto Rico DTPW
- Length: 4.1 km (2.5 mi)

Major junctions
- South end: PR-3 / PR-8887 in San Antón
- PR-26 in Sabana Abajo
- North end: PR-26 in Cangrejo Arriba

Location
- Country: United States
- Territory: Puerto Rico
- Municipalities: Carolina

Highway system
- Roads in Puerto Rico; List
← PR-189	→ PR-191

Puerto Rico Highway 190 (PR-190) is a road located in Carolina, Puerto Rico. This highway begins at its intersection with PR-26 in Cangrejo Arriba and ends at its junction with PR-3 and PR-8887 between Sabana Abajo and San Antón barrios.

== Major intersections ==
The entire route is located in Carolina.

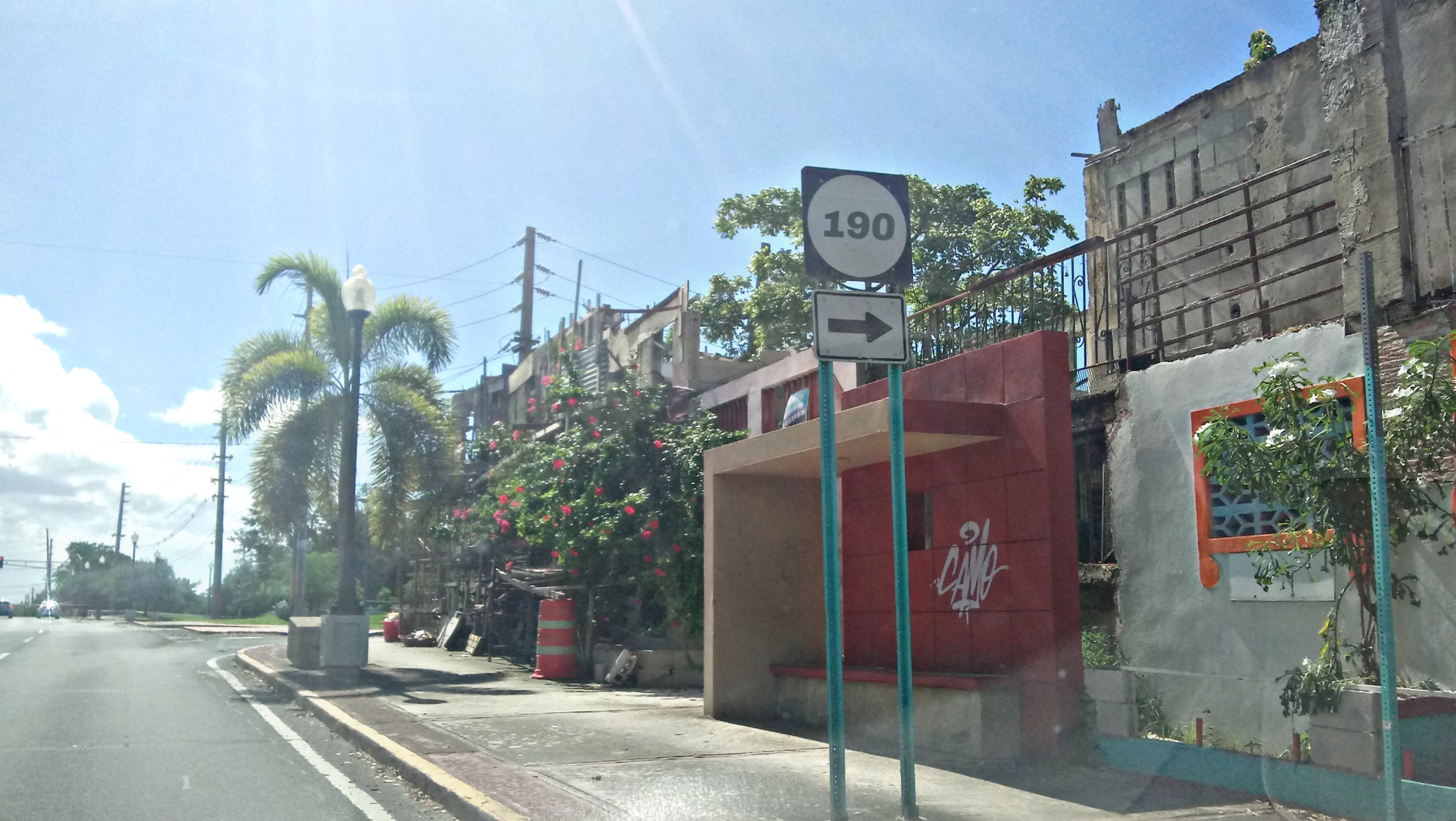
Avenida Monserrate at the Intersection with PR-190 in Carolina

Location	km	mi	Destinations	Notes
San Antón	4.1	2.5	PR-8887	Continuation beyond PR-3
San Antón	4.1	2.5	PR-3 (Avenida 65 de Infantería) – Carolina, Río Piedras	Southern terminus of PR-190 and northern terminus of PR-8887
Sabana Abajo	2.7– 2.6 (Note: PR-190 kilometer markers are interrupted on Avenida Paseo de los Gigantes.)	1.7– 1.6	To PR-26 (Expreso Román Baldorioty de Castro) / PR-Avenida Paseo de los Gigantes – Carolina	Western terminus of PR-190 through Avenida Paseo de los Gigantes; eastbound exit and entrance
Sabana Abajo	2.7– 2.6	1.7– 1.6	PR-26 (Expreso Román Baldorioty de Castro) – San Juan, Carolina	PR-26 exits 13, 13A and 13B; partial cloverleaf interchange
Sabana Abajo	2.7– 2.6	1.7– 1.6	PR-Avenida Paseo de los Gigantes – Carolina	Eastern terminus of PR-190 through Avenida Paseo de los Gigantes; westbound exit and entrance
Sabana Abajo	1.5– 1.4	0.93– 0.87	To PR-26 (Expreso Román Baldorioty de Castro) / PR-Avenida Roberto Sánchez Vilella – Carolina	PR-26 exits 12, 12A and 12B
Cangrejo Arriba	0.0	0.0	PR-26 west (Expreso Román Baldorioty de Castro) – San Juan	Northern terminus of PR-190; incomplete diamond interchange; PR-26 eastbound exit and westbound entrance
1.000 mi = 1.609 km; 1.000 km = 0.621 mi: Incomplete access
