= Minillas (Santurce) =

Subbarrio of Santurce in San Juan, Puerto Rico

- Subbarrio
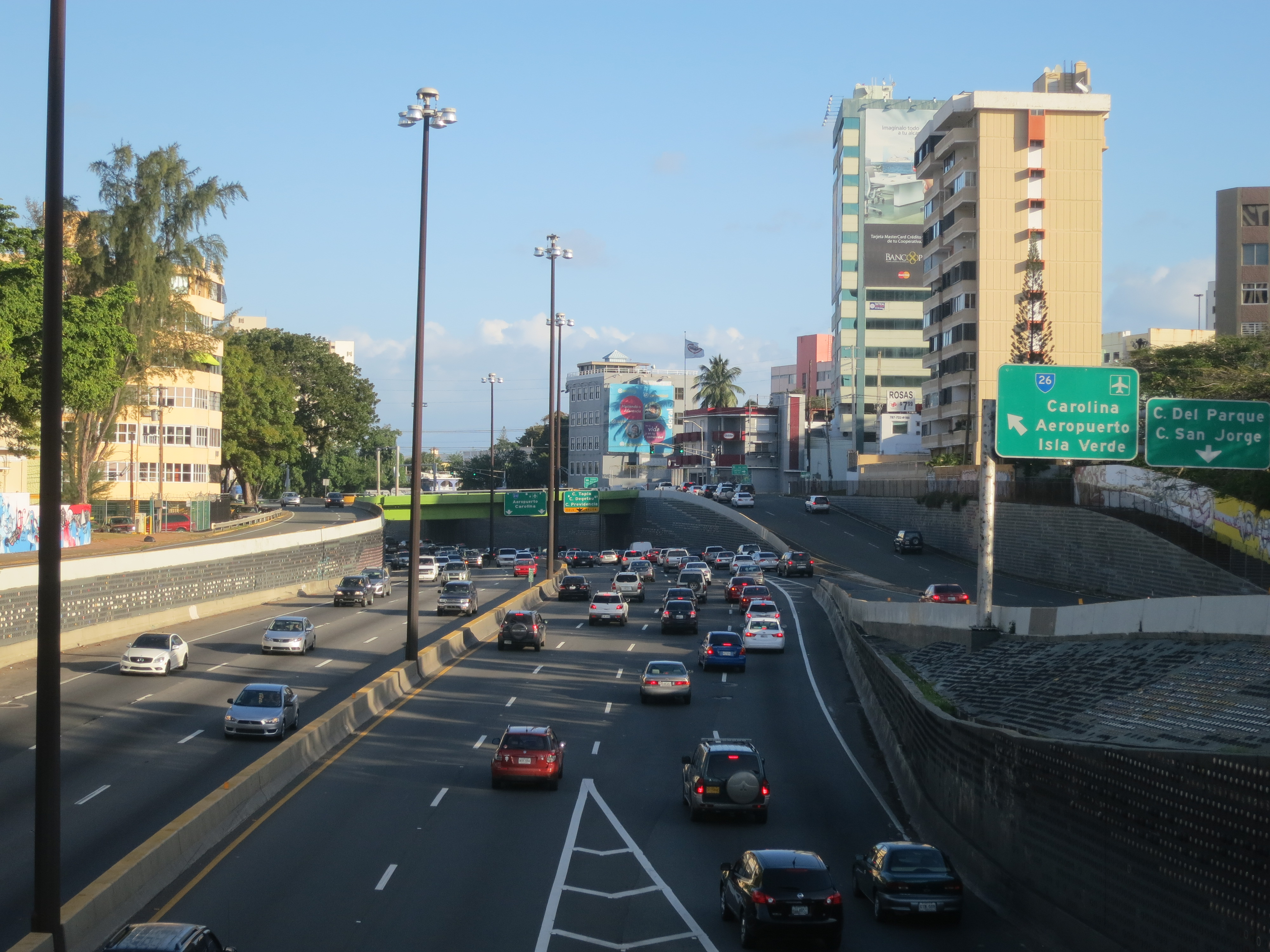
- Puerto Rico Highway 26 in Minillas

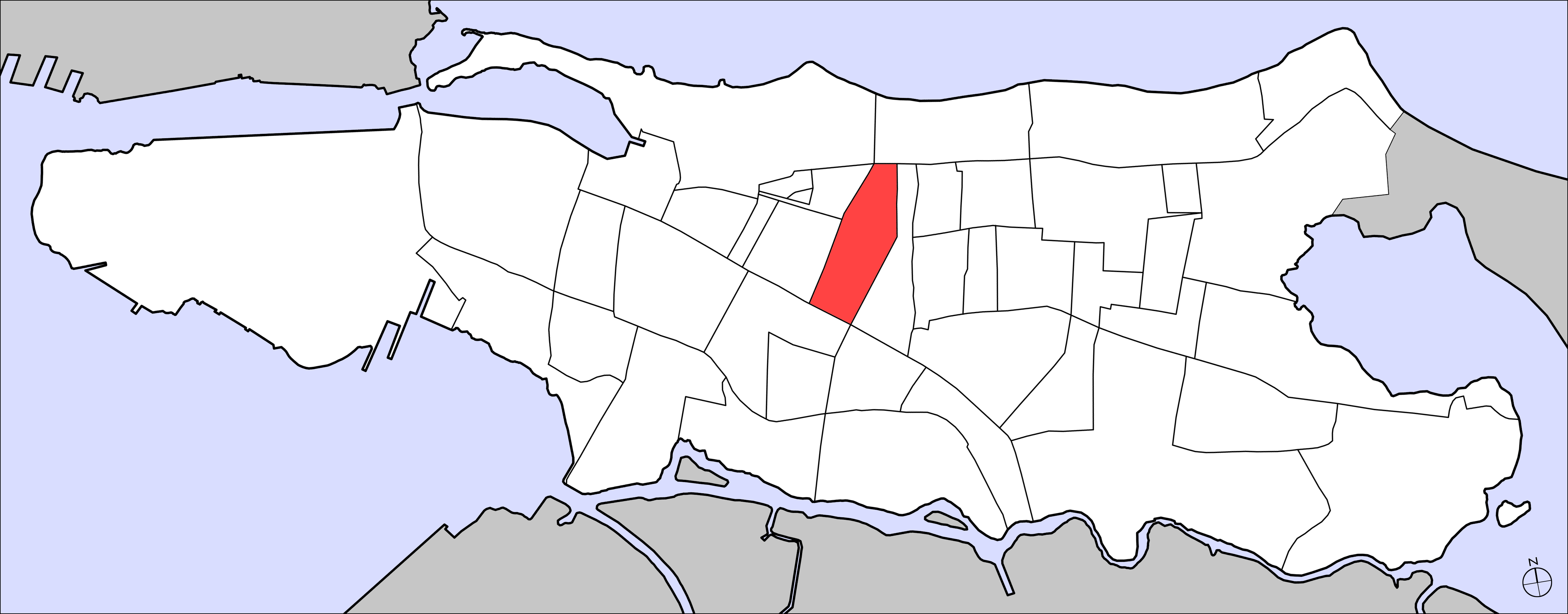
- Location of Minillas within the Barrio of Santurce
- Coordinates: 18°26′55″N 66°3′54″W
- Commonwealth: Puerto Rico
- Municipality: San Juan
- Barrio: Santurce

Area
  - Total: .08 sq mi (0.21 km^{2})
  - Land: .08 sq mi (0.21 km^{2})
- Elevation: 43 ft (13 m)

Population (2010)
  - Total: 1,039
  - Density: 12,987.5/sq mi (5,014.5/km^{2})
- Source: 2010 Census
- Time zone: UTC−4 (AST)

Minillas is one of the 40 subbarrios of Santurce, in the municipality of San Juan, Puerto Rico.

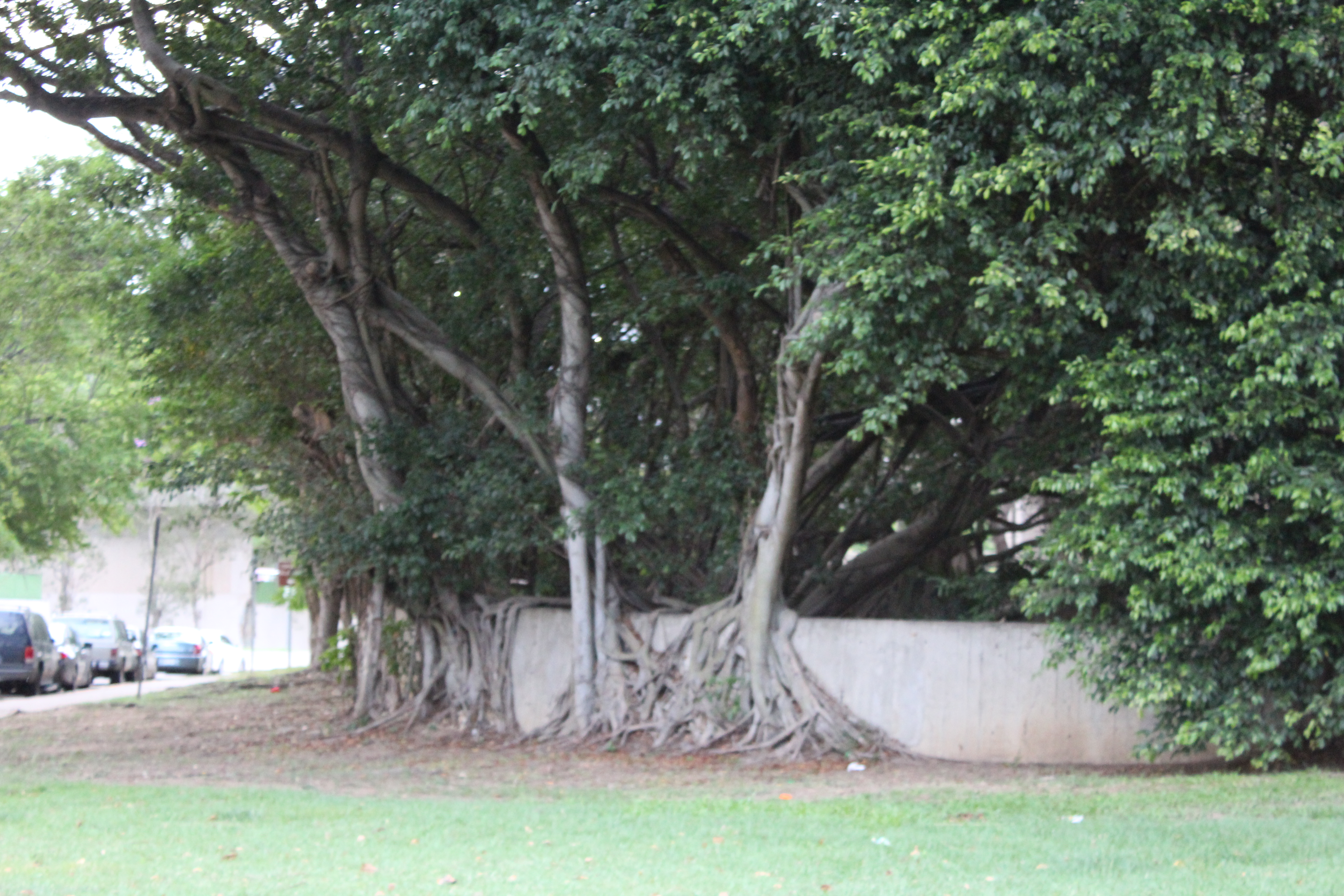
Trees on Avenida José de Diego in Minillas, Santurce

== Demographics ==
In 1940, Minillas had a population of 2,927.

In 2000, Minillas had a population of 1,484.

In 2010, Minillas had a population of 1,039 and a population density of 12,987.5 persons per square mile.

During the summer of 2010, some of its construction sites were utilized as shooting locations for the film Fast Five from the Fast and the Furious series starring Vin Diesel and Tego Calderón.

== See also ==
- List of communities in Puerto Rico
