= Puerto Rico Highway 187 =

Highway in Puerto Rico

Highway 187
- Ruta 187

Route information
- Maintained by Puerto Rico DTPW
- Length: 30.1 km (18.7 mi)
- Existed: 1953–present

Major junctions
- West end: PR-26 in Cangrejo Arriba
- PR-37 in Cangrejo Arriba; PR-951 in Loíza barrio-pueblo; PR-188 in Loíza barrio-pueblo; PR-951 in Loíza barrio-pueblo; PR-964 in Medianía Alta; PR-965 in Medianía Alta; PR-187R in Río Grande barrio-pueblo
- East end: PR-3 / PR-66 in Guzmán Abajo

Location
- Country: United States
- Territory: Puerto Rico
- Municipalities: Carolina, Loíza, Río Grande

Highway system
- Roads in Puerto Rico; List
← PR-186	→ PR-188
← PR-165R	PR-187R	→ PR-198R

Puerto Rico Highway 187 (PR-187) is a road that travels from Río Grande, Puerto Rico to Carolina, passing through Loíza. This highway begins at its intersection with PR-3 and PR-66 in Guzmán Abajo and ends at PR-26 in Isla Verde.

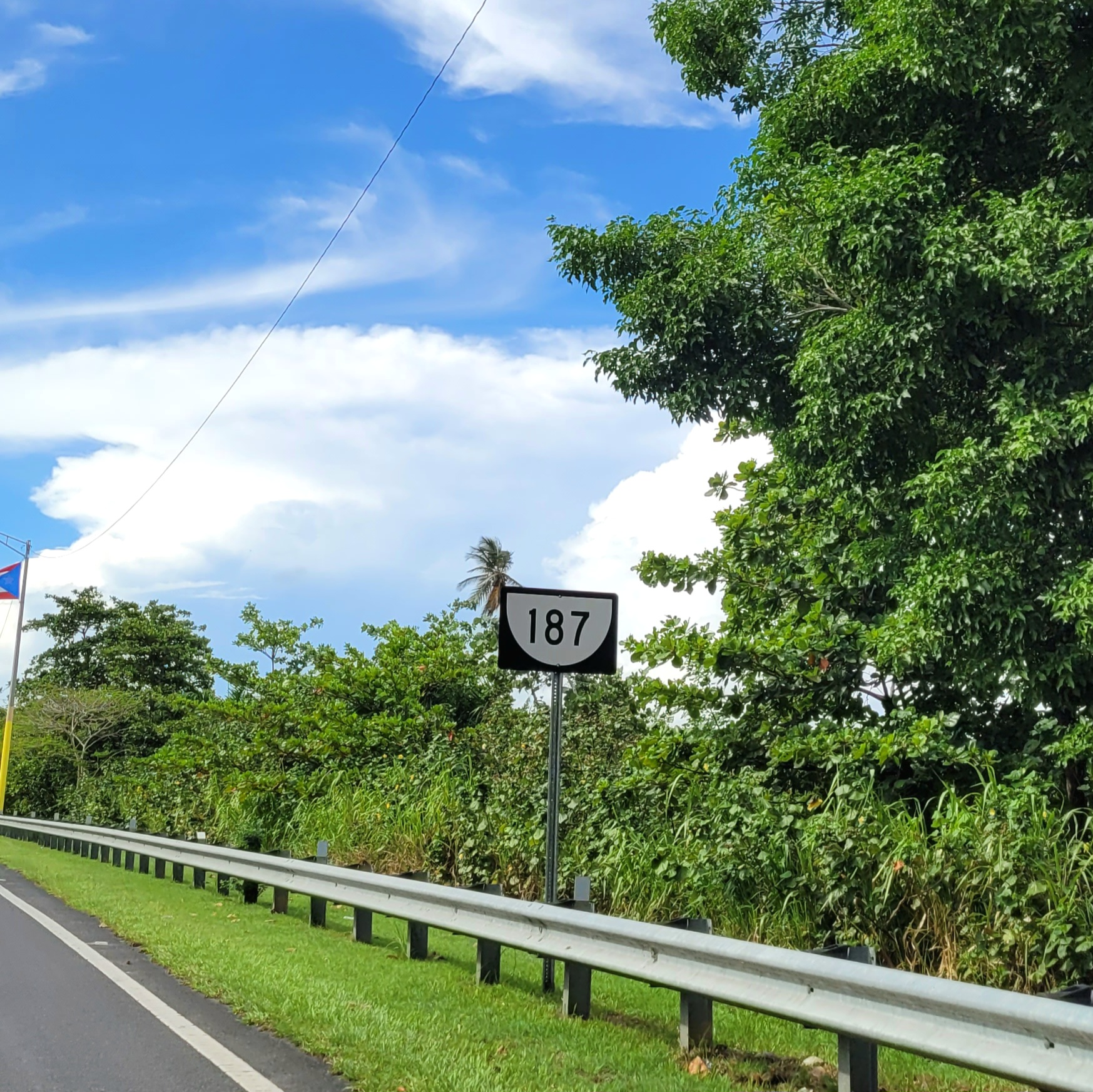
PR-187 west in Torrecilla Baja, Loíza

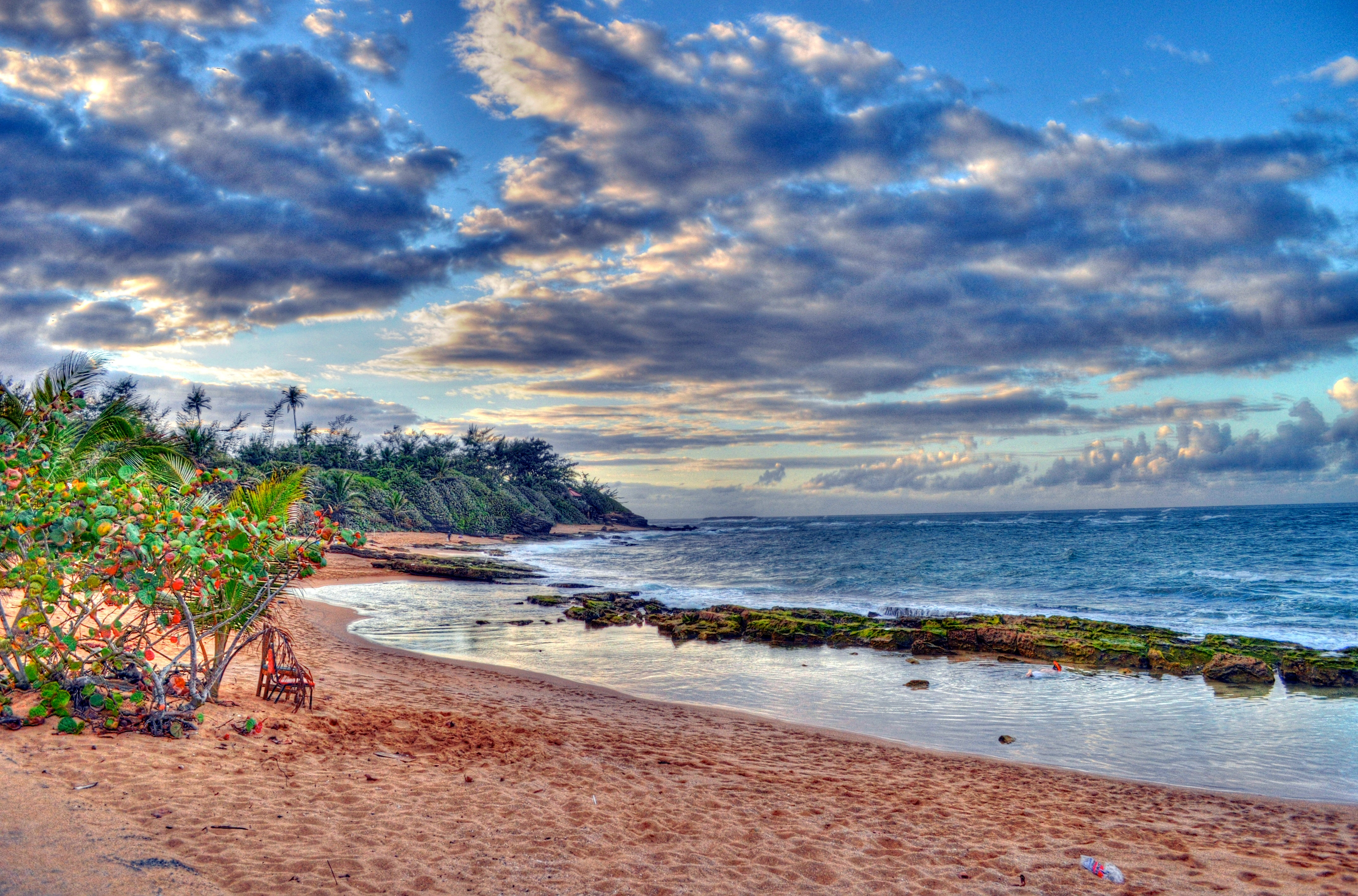
Piñones in Loíza from PR-187

== Major intersections ==
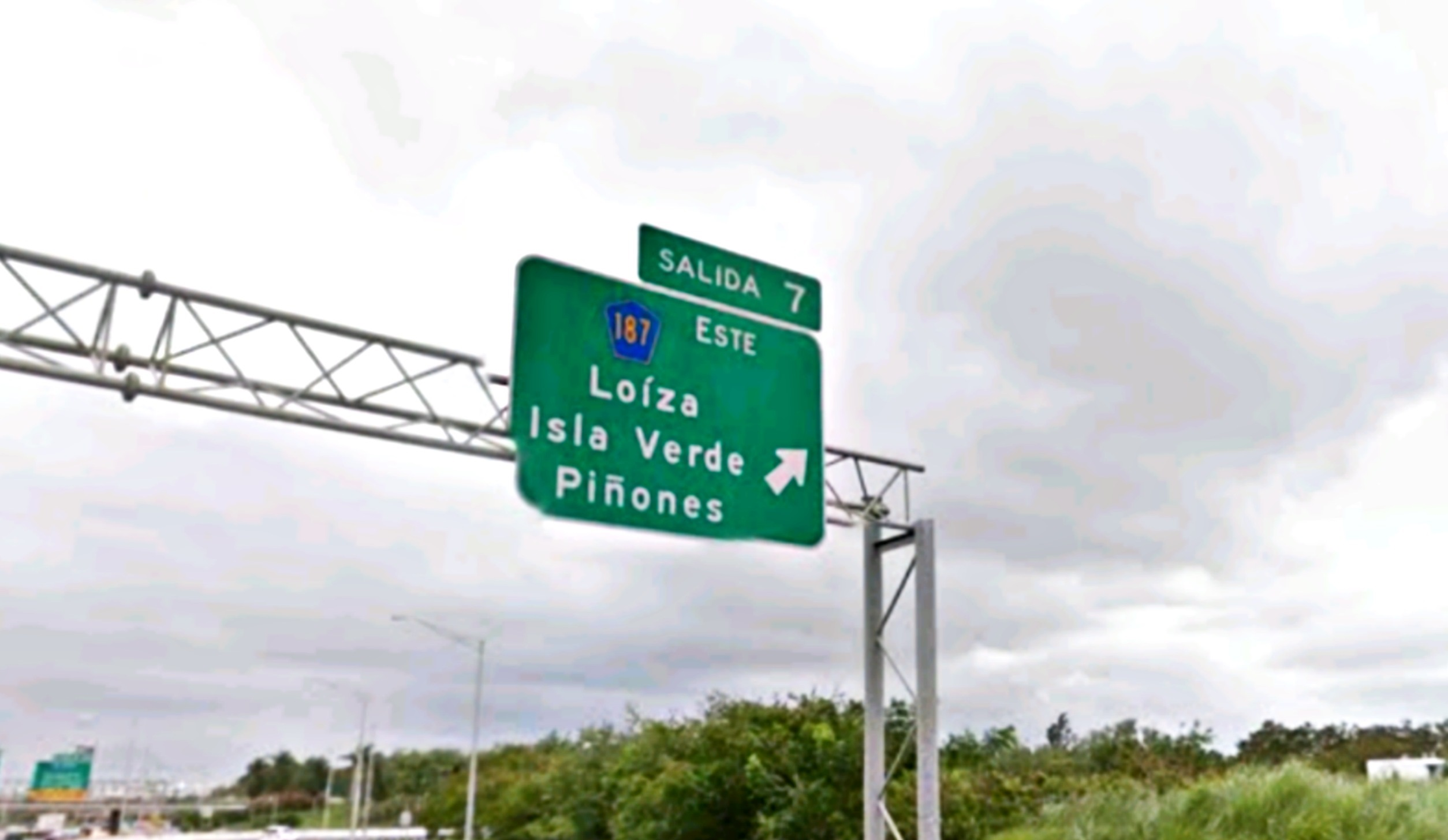
PR-26 exit to PR-187 in Isla Verde, Carolina

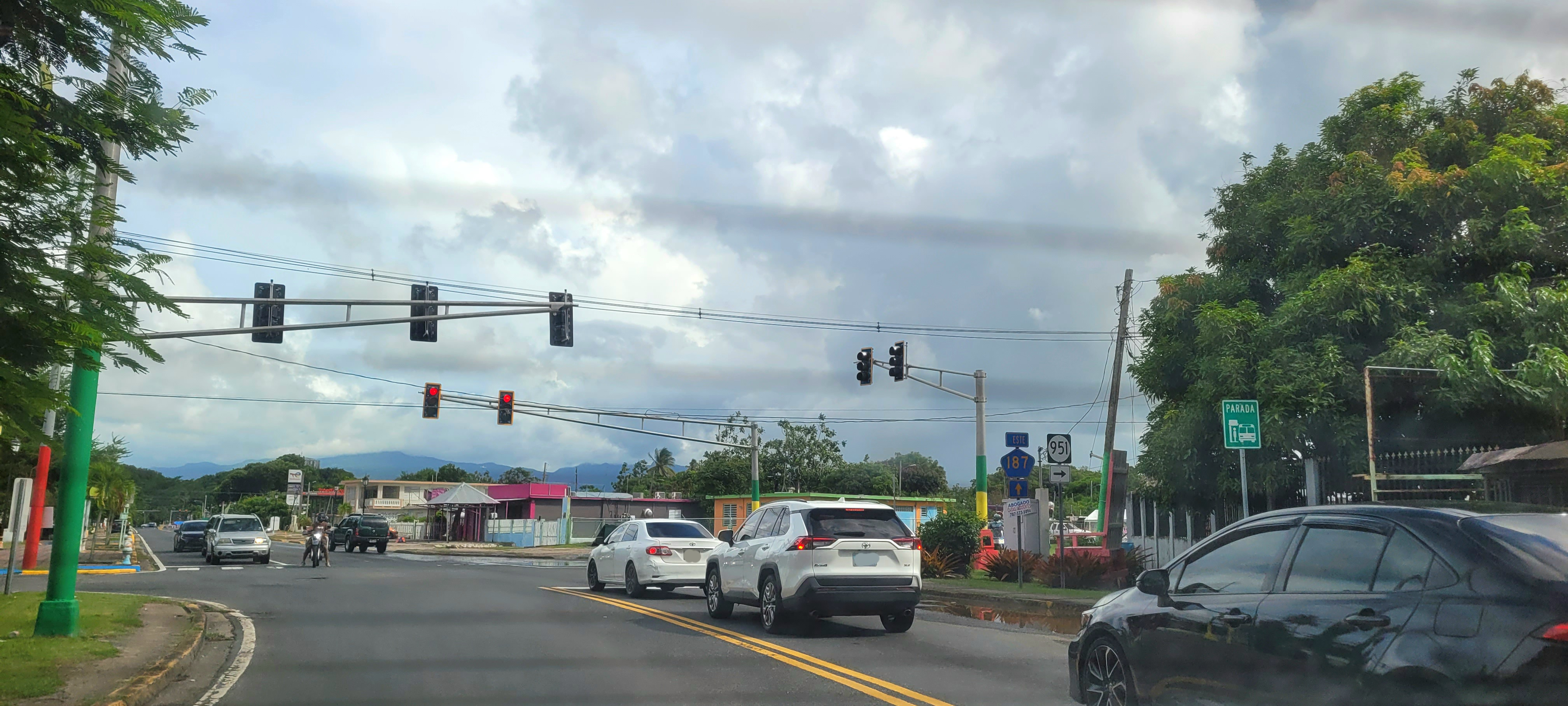
PR-187 at PR-951 junction in downtown Loíza, looking east

Municipality	Location	km	mi	Destinations	Notes
Carolina	Cangrejo Arriba	0.0	0.0	PR-26 (Expreso Román Baldorioty de Castro) to PR-17 west (Puente Teodoro Moscoso) – San Juan, Carolina	Western terminus of PR-187; PR-26 exit 7; trumpet interchange
Carolina	Cangrejo Arriba	0.9– 1.1	0.56– 0.68	PR-37 (Avenida Isla Verde) – Isla Verde	
Loíza	Loíza barrio-pueblo	17.9	11.1	PR-951 (Calle Espíritu Santo) – Loíza, Canóvanas	Northbound access via Calle San Patricio
Loíza	Loíza barrio-pueblo	18.3– 18.4	11.4– 11.4	PR-188 south – Canóvanas	
Loíza	Loíza barrio-pueblo	19.2	11.9	PR-951 south (Calle San Patricio) – Loíza	
Loíza	Medianía Alta	23.1– 23.2	14.4– 14.4	PR-964 (Carretera Alcalde Gabriel Santos López) – Medianía Alta	
Loíza	Medianía Alta	23.6– 23.7	14.7– 14.7	PR-965 – Medianía Alta	
Río Grande	Río Grande barrio-pueblo	29.7	18.5	PR-187R (Calle Pimentel) – Río Grande	One-way street
Río Grande	Guzmán Abajo	30.1	18.7	PR-3 to PR-186 – Fajardo, Canóvanas	Eastern terminus of PR-187 and PR-66
Río Grande	Guzmán Abajo	30.1	18.7	PR-66 west (Autopista Roberto Sánchez Vilella) – Guzmán Abajo	Continuation beyond PR-3
1.000 mi = 1.609 km; 1.000 km = 0.621 mi: Incomplete access

== Related route ==
Highway 187R
- Location: Río Grande
- Length: 1.1 km (0.68 mi)

Puerto Rico Highway 187R (Spanish: Carretera Ramal 187, abbreviated Ramal PR-187 or PR-187R) is a road that branches off from PR-187 to PR-3 in downtown Río Grande. The entire route is located in Río Grande.

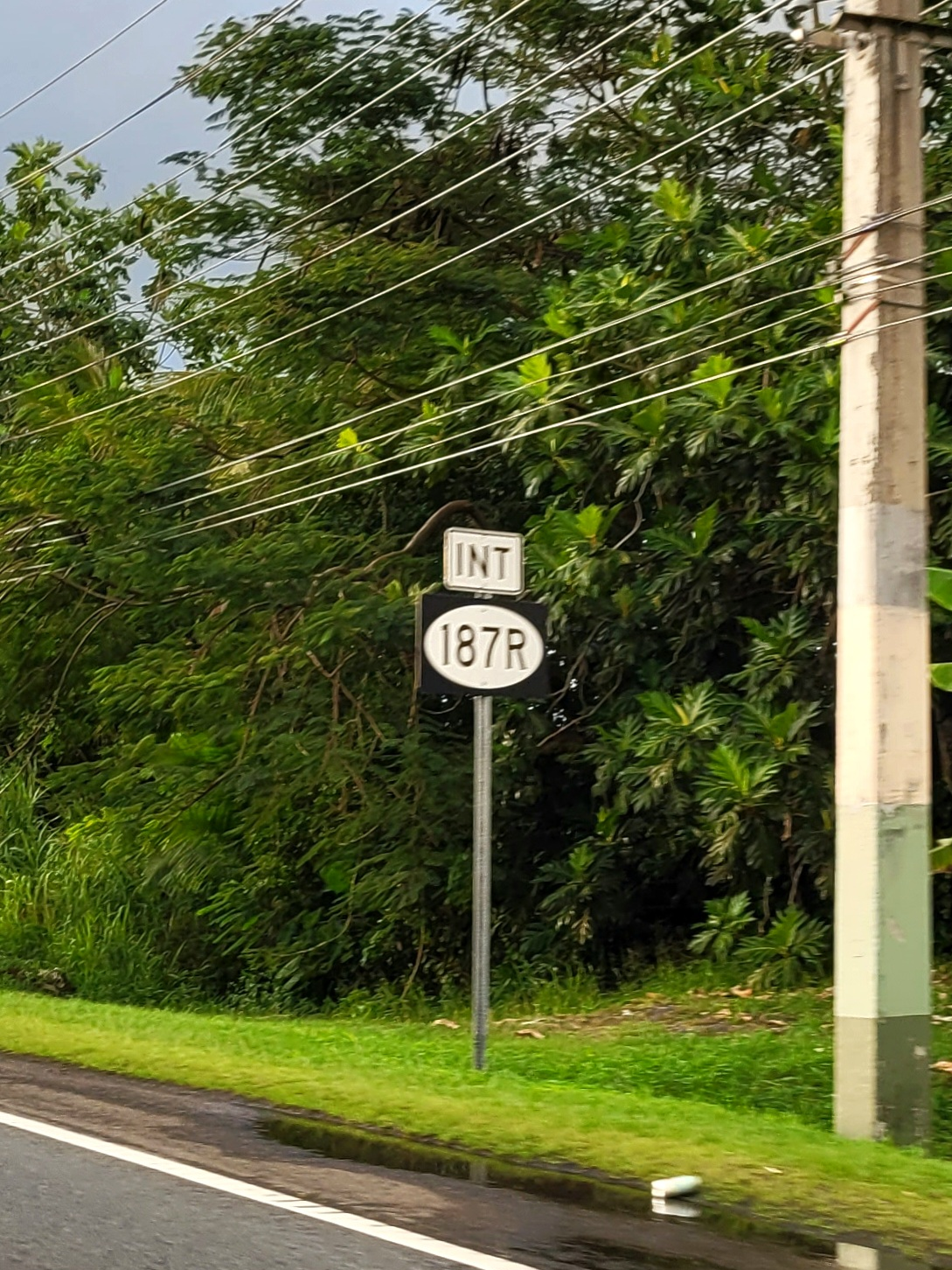
PR-3 approaching PR-187R intersection between downtown Río Grande and Guzmán Abajo

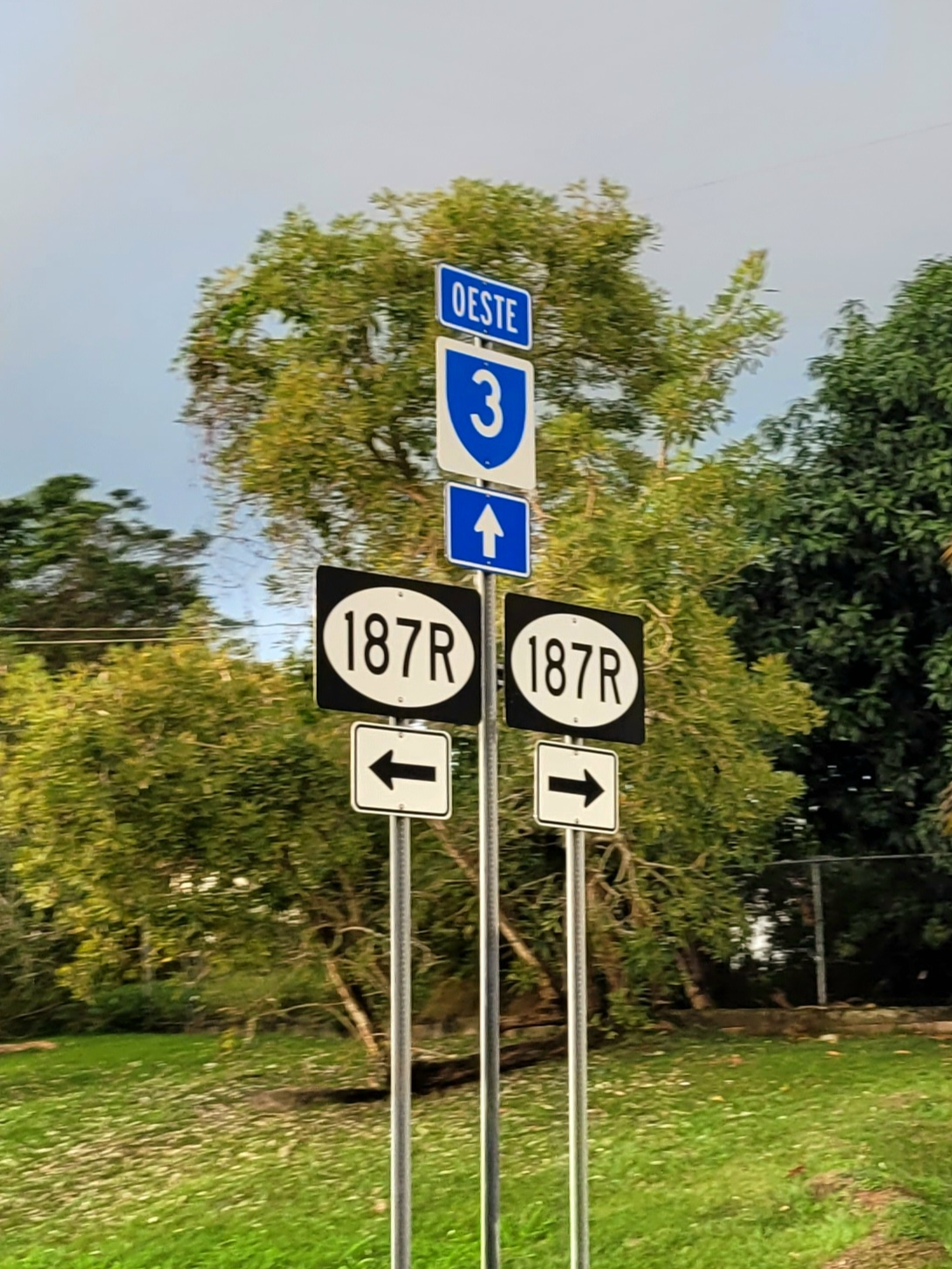
PR-3 near PR-187R intersection between downtown Río Grande and Guzmán Abajo

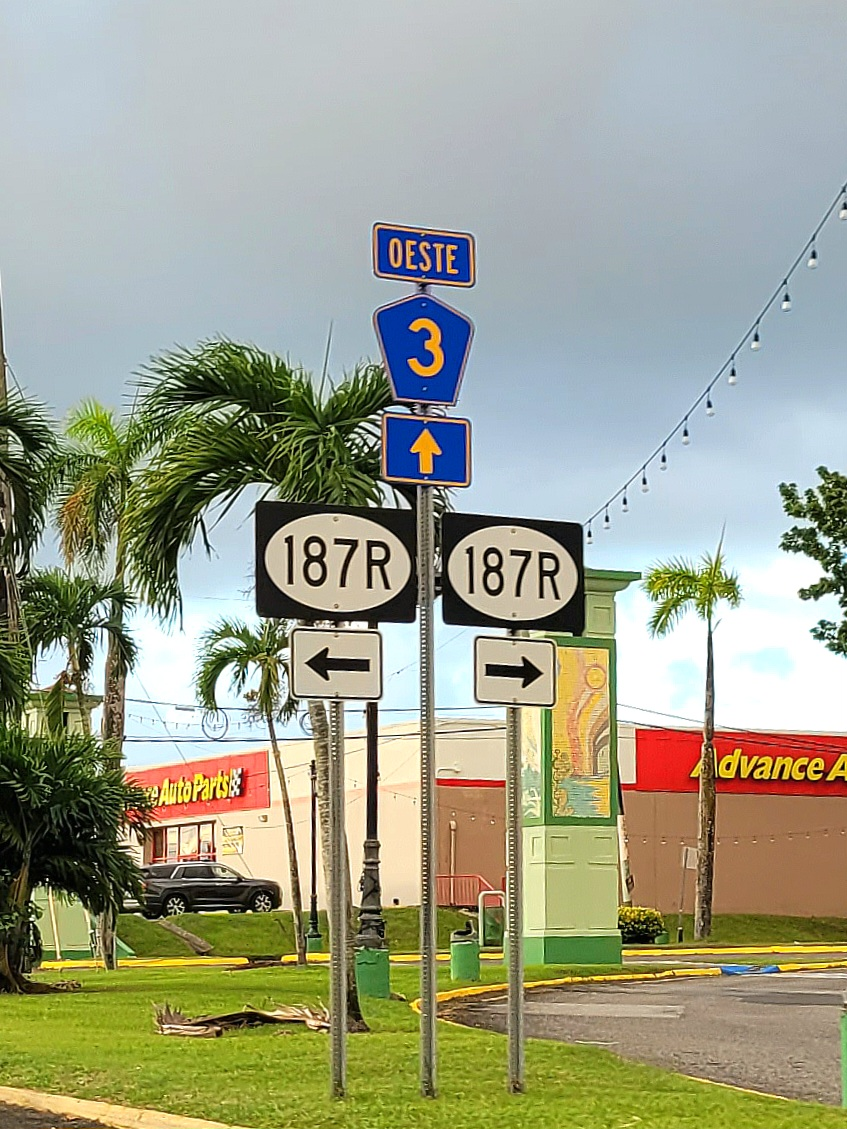
PR-3 at PR-187R intersection in Ciénaga Baja

Location	km	mi	Destinations	Notes
Ciénaga Baja	1.1	0.68	PR-3 west – Canóvanas	Western terminus of PR-187R
Ciénaga Baja	0.9– 0.8	0.56– 0.50	PR-3 east – Fajardo	
Río Grande barrio-pueblo	0.0	0.0	PR-187 (Calle San Antonio) – Río Grande, Loíza	Eastern terminus of PR-187R
1.000 mi = 1.609 km; 1.000 km = 0.621 mi

== See also ==
- 1953 Puerto Rico highway renumbering
