= Puerto Rico Highway 66 =

Highway in Puerto Rico

Highway 66
- Ruta 66
- Autopista Roberto Sánchez Vilella
- PR-66 highlighted in red

Route information
- Maintained by Metropistas
- Length: 19.5 km (12.1 mi)
- Existed: 2006–present

Major junctions
- West end: PR-3 / PR-26 in San Antón
- PR-887 in Martín González; PR-853 in Trujillo Bajo; PR-185 in Canóvanas; PR-9188 in Canóvanas; PR-956 in Guzmán Abajo
- East end: PR-3 / PR-187 in Guzmán Abajo

Location
- Country: United States
- Territory: Puerto Rico
- Municipalities: Carolina, Canóvanas, Río Grande

Highway system
- Roads in Puerto Rico; List
← PR-65	→ PR-100

Puerto Rico Highway 66 (PR-66) (Note: PR-66 is the unsigned Interstate PRI3) is a main tollway which parallels Puerto Rico Highway 3 going from the city of Carolina, Puerto Rico via a 3 loops cloverleaf interchange with PR-26 and PR-3, a major exit in the form of a Trumpet interchange in Canóvanas, Puerto Rico and ending in the municipality of Río Grande, Puerto Rico with an intersection of PR-3. It is only 19.5 kilometres (12.1 mi) long and has very few exits, which work mainly to minimize traffic in the congested Carolina area of PR-3.

The highway is called the Roberto Sánchez Vilella Expressway, which is also the name given to the much larger PR-2 freeway segment from Hormigueros to Ponce. The second phase of PR-66 from Canóvanas to Río Grande was opened on 1 October 2012.

== Route description ==
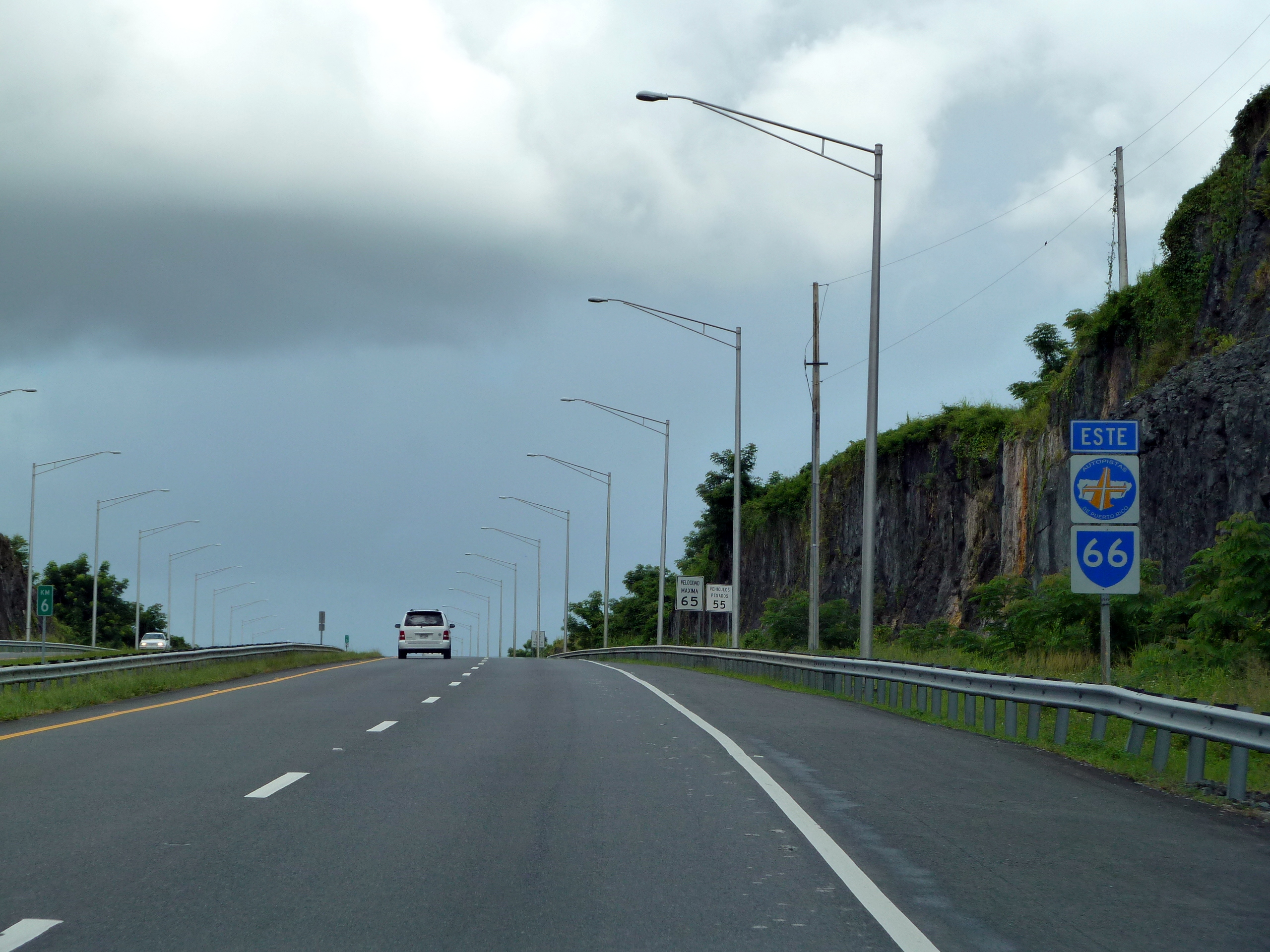
A stretch of PR-66 heading to Río Grande

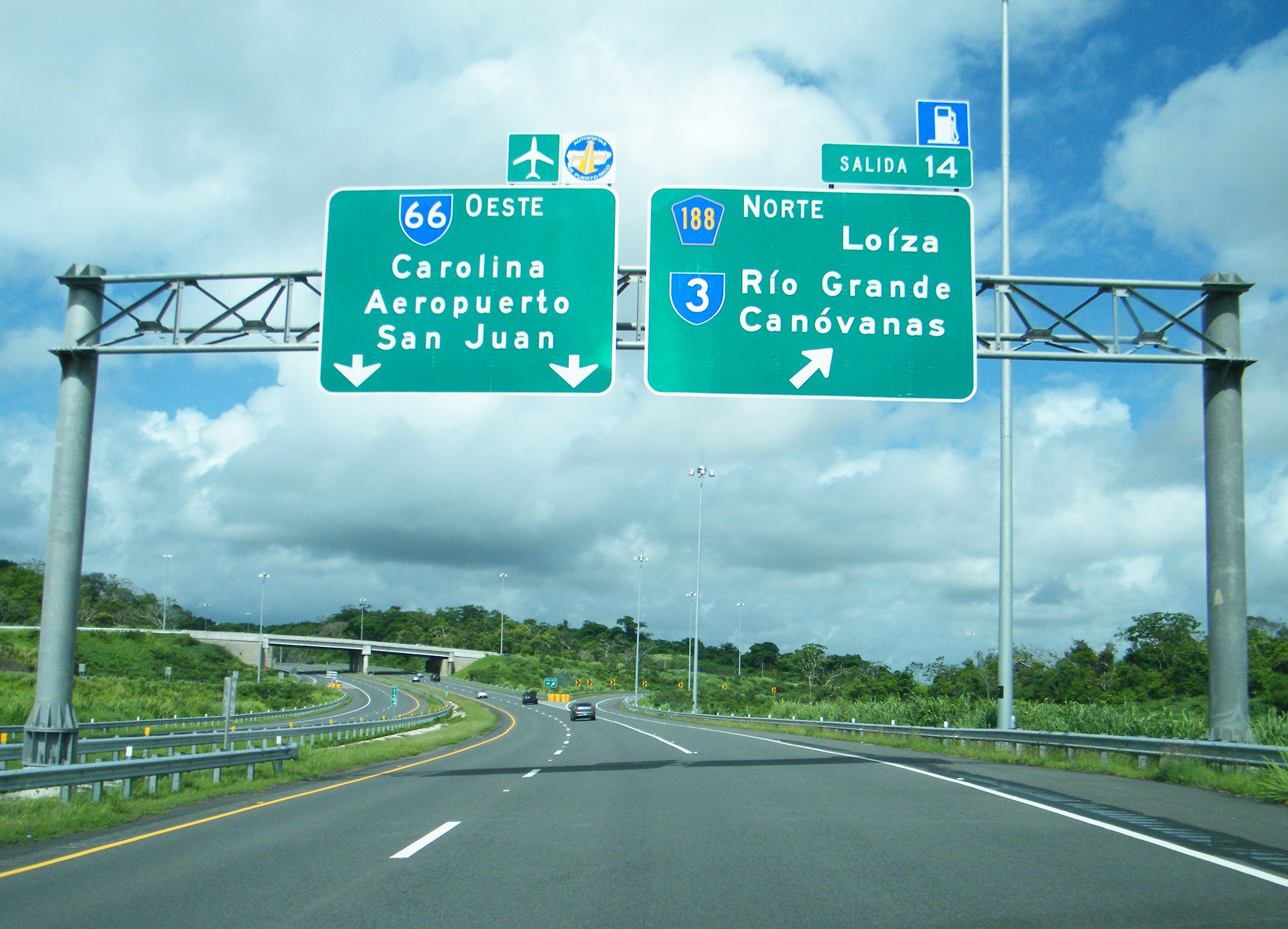
PR-66 interchange with PR-188 in Canóvanas

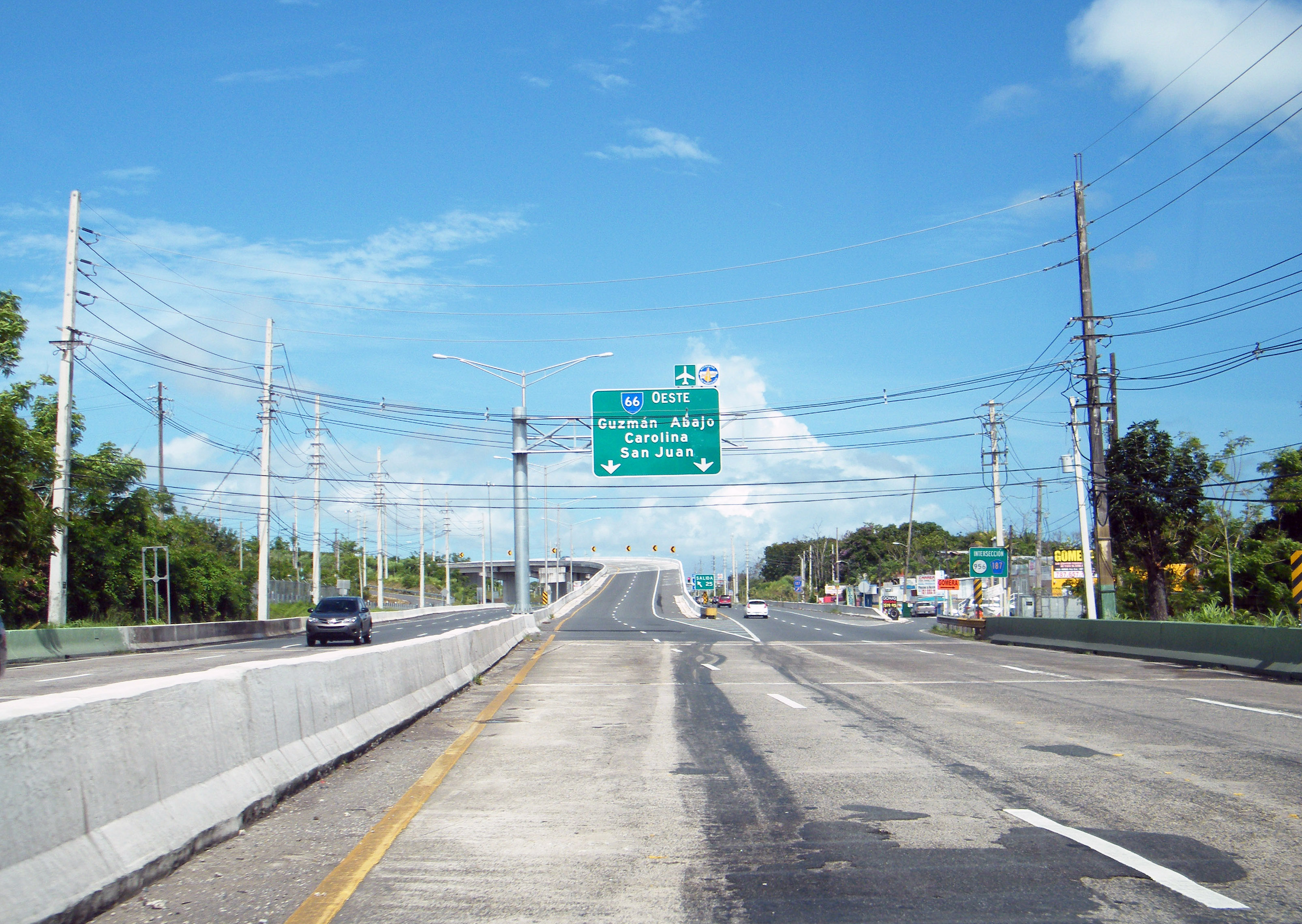
PR-66 starts at PR-3 in Río Grande

=== Naming ===
PR-66 is, in reality, an extension of older expressway PR-26, as both expressways are attached (that is, there is no need to take an exit to enter the other expressway, much like PR-18 and PR-52). PR-66 was assigned that number after U.S. Route 66 in the United States.

=== Controversy ===
PR-66 is very close to the El Yunque National Forest and at the start of construction there were problems between developers and environmental activists. Several acts of disobedience took place, including removing beams which had already been installed. The expressway was planned to be extended to Fajardo but due to the close presence of the forest reserve, it was accorded to be extended to Río Grande and connect to PR-3 which has several exits between that municipality and Fajardo. It is possible PR-3 will be converted into a complete freeway, in that segment, as it approaches PR-53.

The short expressway is very expensive in terms of toll fees and many people still go through PR-3 as a consequence. There are no plans to change the cost. The current toll fees are $1.50 and $1.00, respectively. This makes this small freeway the second most expensive tollway in the US (excluding bridges and tunnels), after the Dulles Greenway in Virginia in terms of its small length, about 30 cents per mile (19 ¢/km). The result is that PR-66 has low traffic most all the time, including during rush hours. As of December 2011, the toll must be paid by pre-paid AutoExpreso.

== Tolls ==
Location	Toll	Direction	AutoExpreso acceptance	AutoExpreso replenishment (R) lane
Carolina	$1.70	Two-way		
Rampa Carolina Norte	$0.90	Westbound exit (ramp)		
Rampa Carolina Sur	$0.90	Eastbound entrance (ramp)		
Río Grande	$1.10	Two-way		

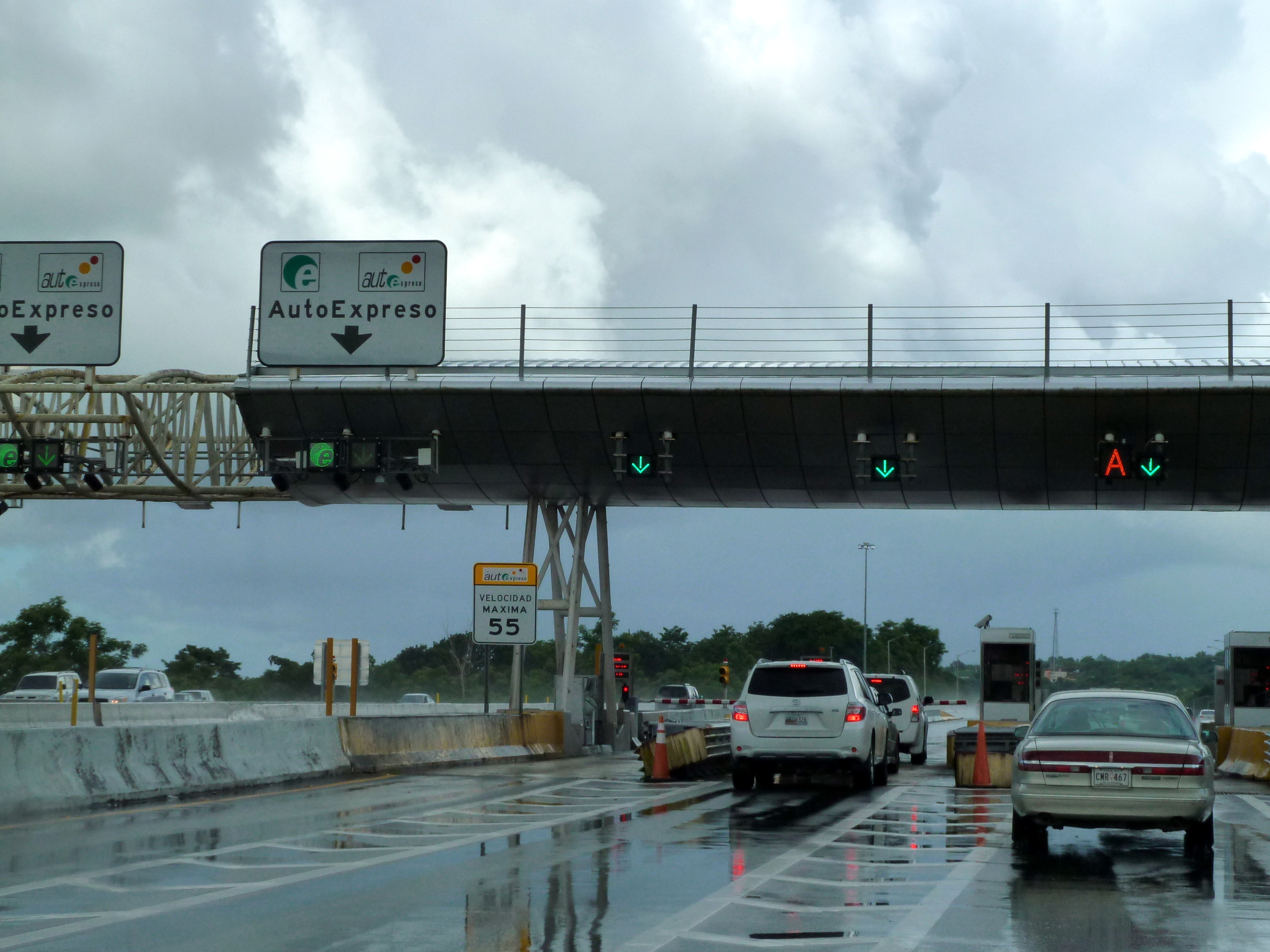
Carolina Toll Plaza

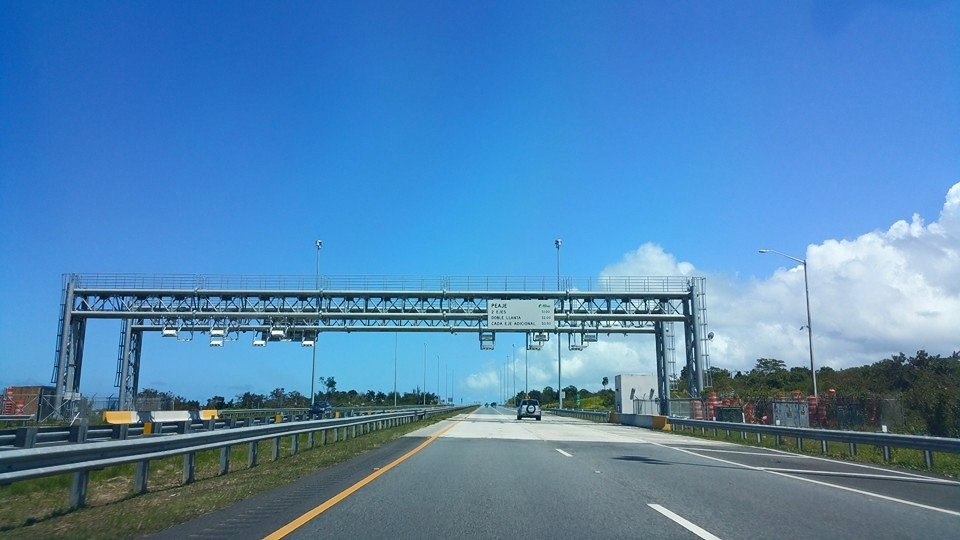
Río Grande Toll Plaza

== Exit list ==
Municipality	Location	km	mi	Exit	Destinations	Notes
Carolina	San Antón	0.0	0.0	—	PR-3 (Avenida 65 de Infantería) / PR-Avenida Jesús M. Fragoso – Carolina, Río Piedras PR-26 north (Expreso Román Baldorioty de Castro) – San Juan, Aeropuerto	Western terminus of PR-66
Carolina	Martín González	1.4	0.87	1	PR-887 – Carolina, Trujillo Alto, Saint Just	
Carolina	Martín González	3.2	2.0	Carolina Toll Plaza		
Carolina	Trujillo Bajo	4.9	3.0	5	PR-853 (Carretera Felipe Birriel Fernández, "El Gigante de Carolina") – Carolina, Barrazas, Carruzos	Toll exit
Canóvanas	Canóvanas	10.8	6.7	10	PR-185 – Canóvanas, Juncos	Eastbound exit and westbound entrance
Canóvanas	Canóvanas	13.1	8.1	14	PR-9188 to PR-3 / PR-188 north – Canóvanas, Río Grande, Loíza	Unsigned
Río Grande	Guzmán Abajo	16.8	10.4	Río Grande Toll Plaza (ETC only; no AutoExpreso replenishment lane)		
Río Grande	Guzmán Abajo	19.1	11.9	19	PR-956 – Guzmán Abajo	
Río Grande	Guzmán Abajo	19.5	12.1	—	PR-3 / PR-187 north – Canóvanas, Luquillo, Fajardo, Río Grande	Eastern terminus of PR-66; PR-3 exit 25
1.000 mi = 1.609 km; 1.000 km = 0.621 mi: Electronic toll collection; Incomplete access; Tolled

== See also ==
- Interstate Highways in Puerto Rico
- Roberto Sánchez Vilella
