= Puerto Rico Highway 26 =

Highway in Puerto Rico

Highway 26
- Ruta 26
- Expreso Román Baldorioty de Castro

Route information
- Maintained by Puerto Rico DTPW
- Length: 15.1 km (9.4 mi)
- Existed: 1982 and completed in 1999–present

Major junctions
- West end: PR-1 / PR-16 in Santurce
- PR-2 in Santurce; PR-22 in Santurce; PR-37 in Santurce; PR-187 in Cangrejo Arriba; PR-17 in Cangrejo Arriba; PR-190 in Cangrejo Arriba
- East end: PR-3 / PR-66 in San Antón

Location
- Country: United States
- Territory: Puerto Rico
- Municipalities: San Juan, Carolina

Highway system
- Roads in Puerto Rico; List
← PR-25	→ PR-27

Puerto Rico Highway 26 (PR-26), (Note: PR-26 is the unsigned Interstate PRI3) called the Román Baldorioty de Castro Expressway, is the main highway to the Luis Muñoz Marín International Airport and is connected to PR-66. It was converted to a freeway to minimize the traffic in PR-3 and PR-17, to grant better access to the Airport. Several exits exist to provide access to PR-187 (the main route to the Piñones area), PR-37 (Isla Verde) and PR-22 (José de Diego). PR-26 is 15.1 km (9.4 mi) long.

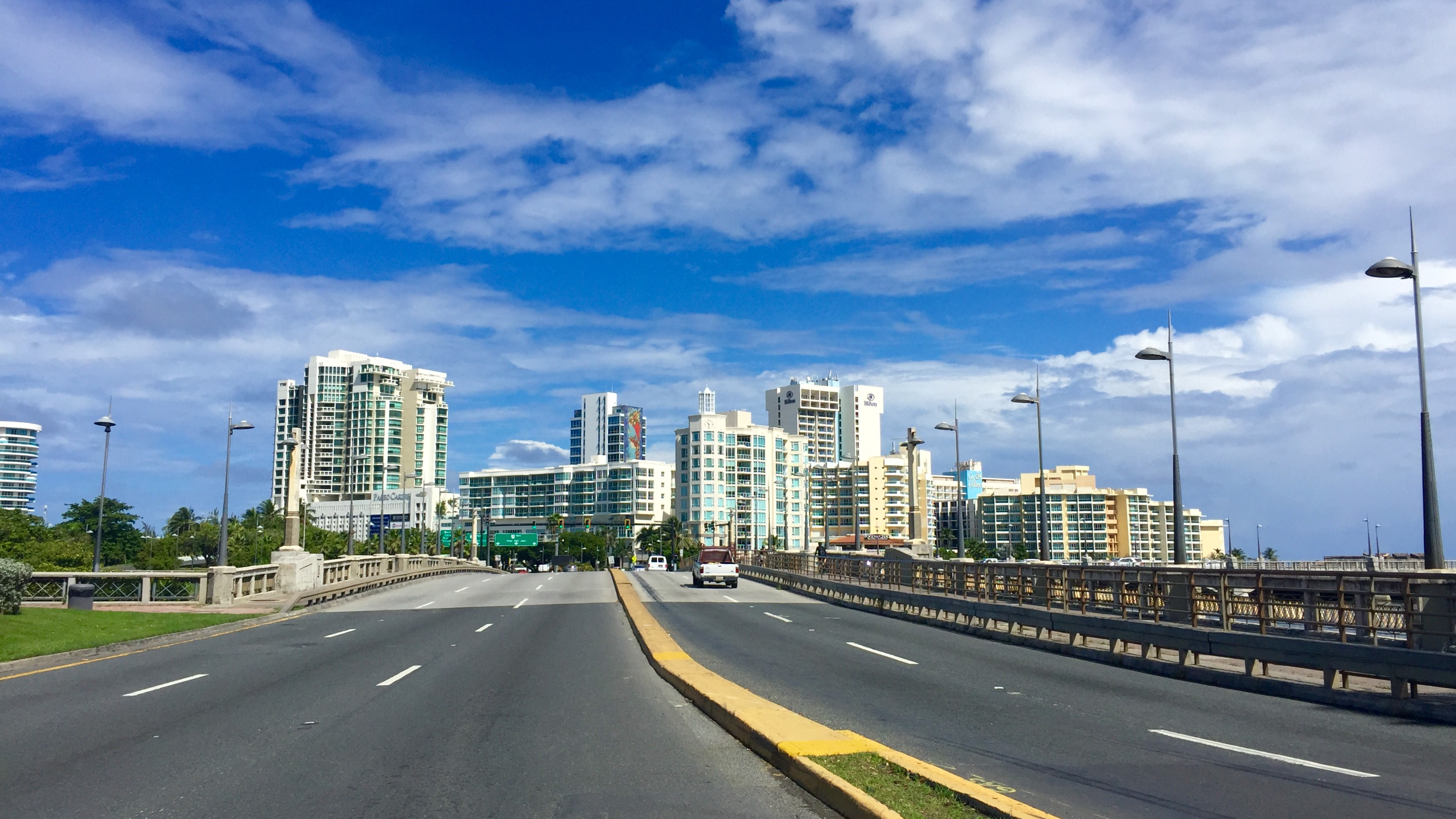
San Antonio Bridge in PR-26

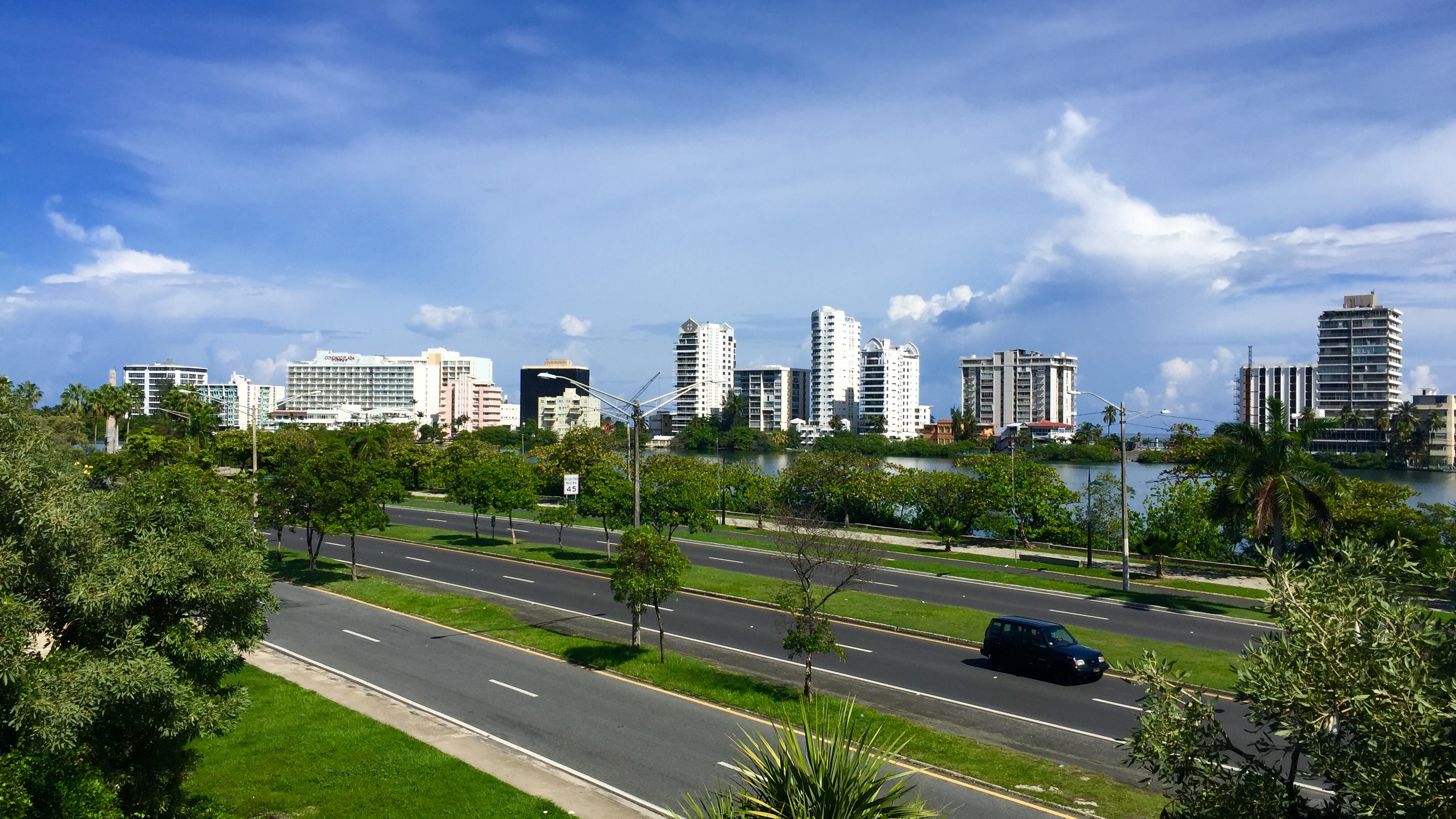
PR-26 in Condado

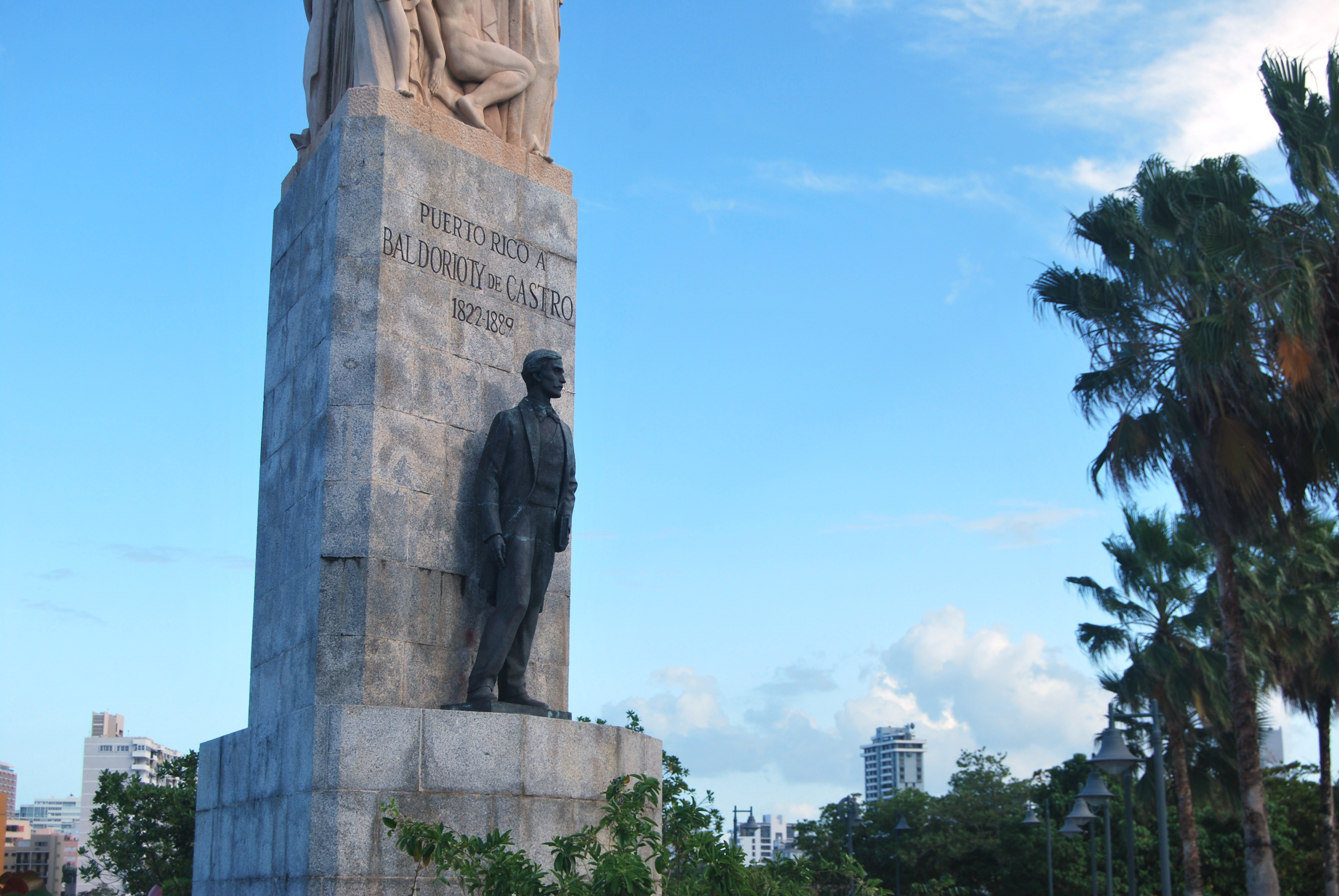
Román Baldorioty de Castro Statue in PR-26

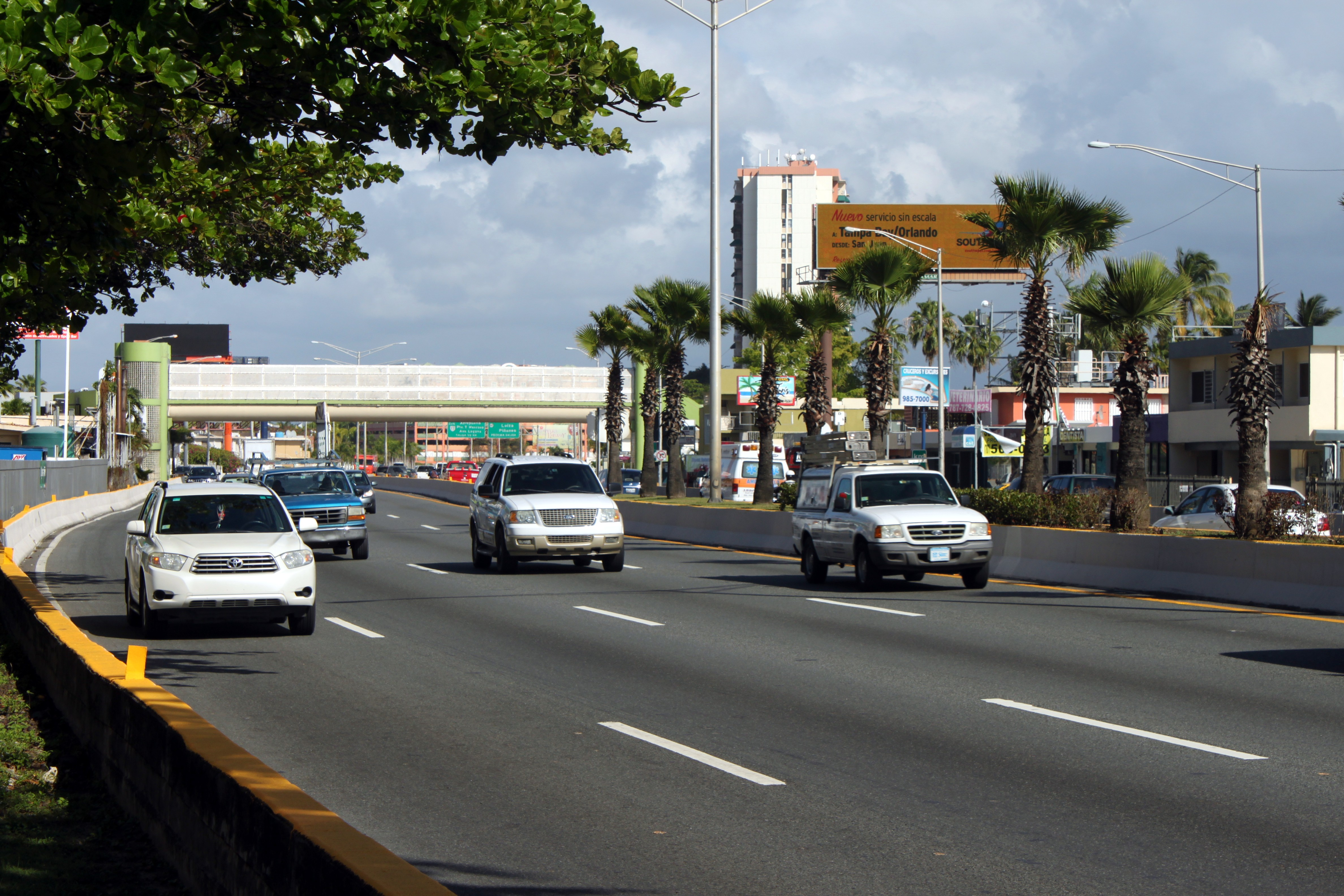
PR-26 in Isla Verde

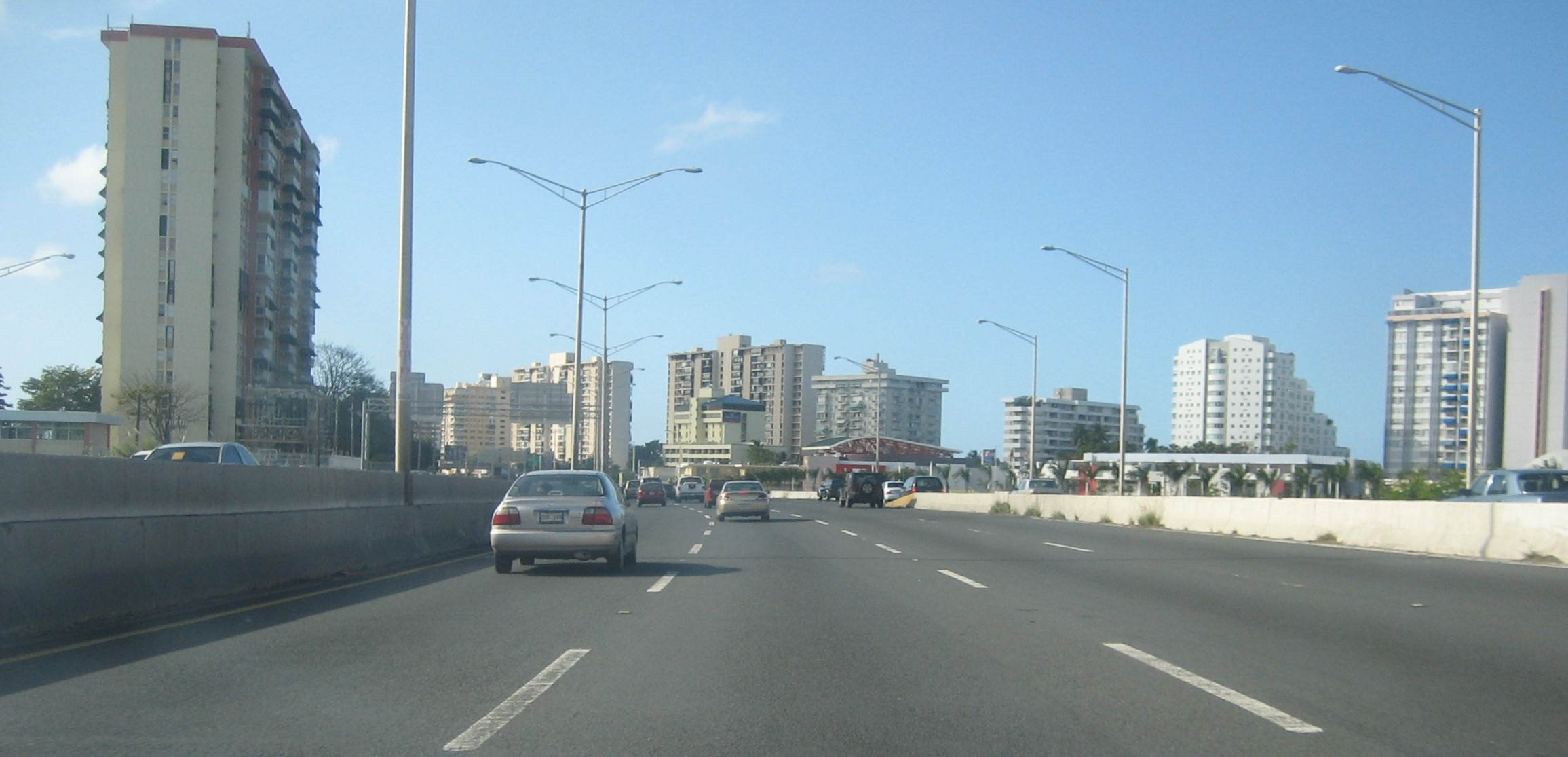
Puerto Rico Highway 26 in Isla Verde

== Exit list ==
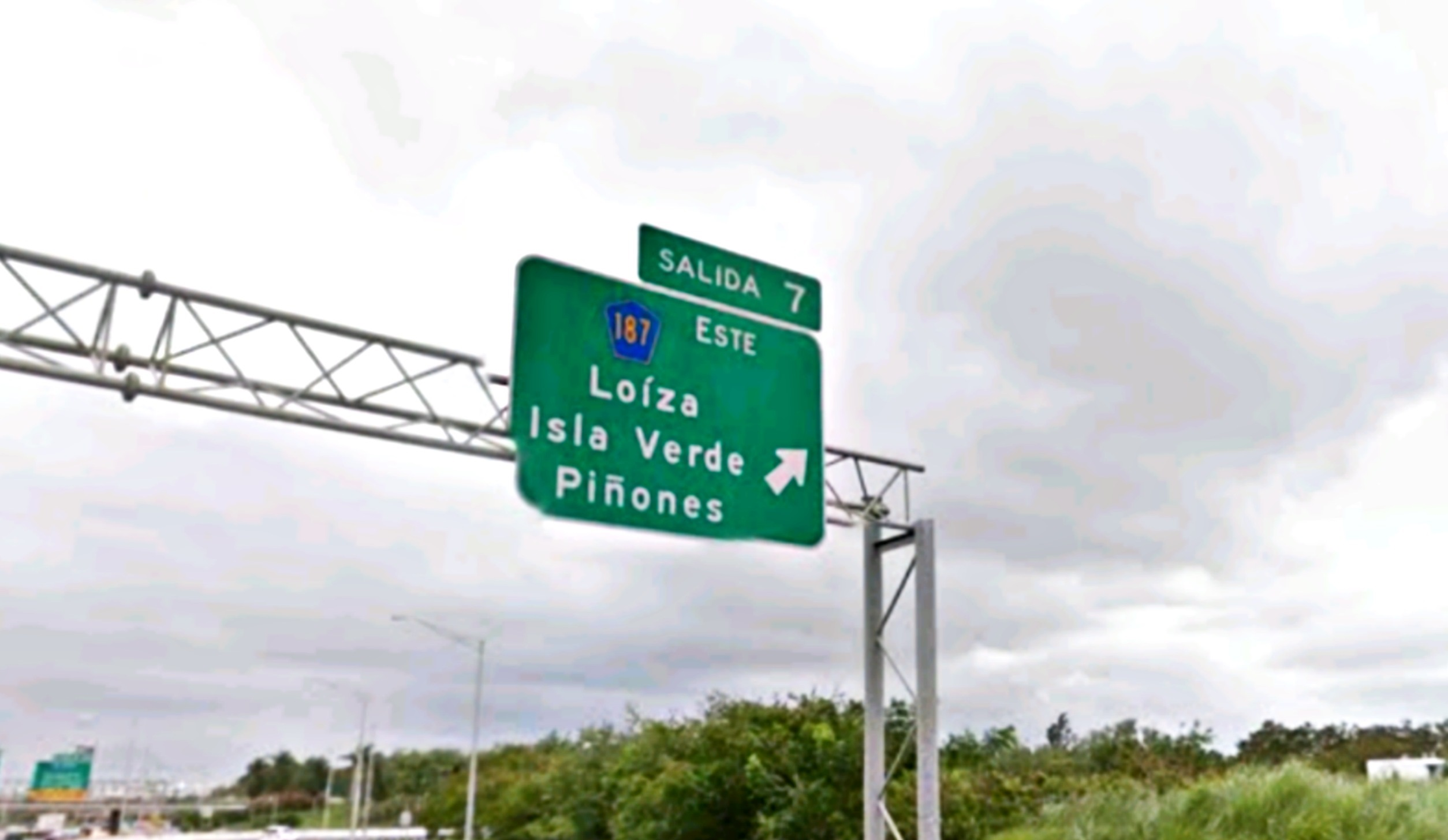
Expreso Román Baldorioty de Castro Salida 7

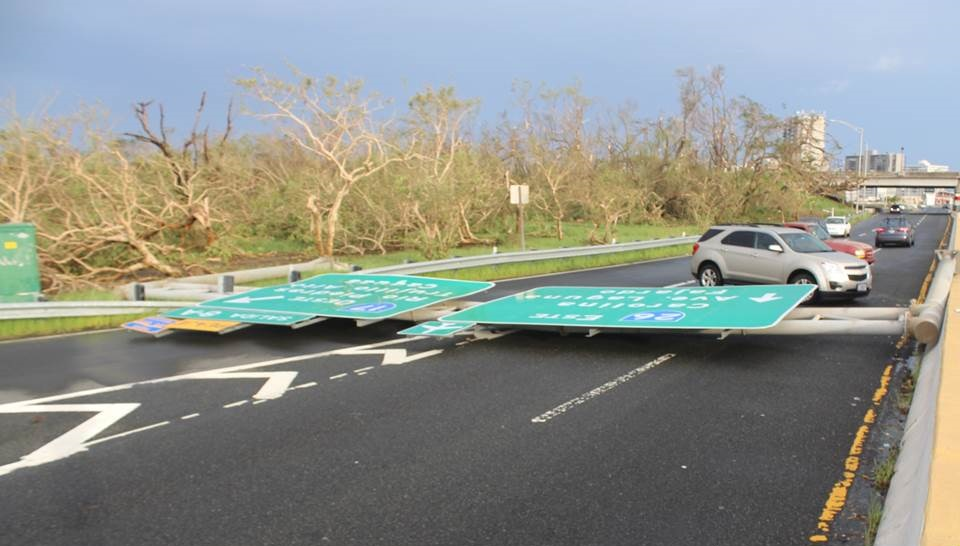
PR-26 in Carolina after Hurricane Maria (September 20, 2017)

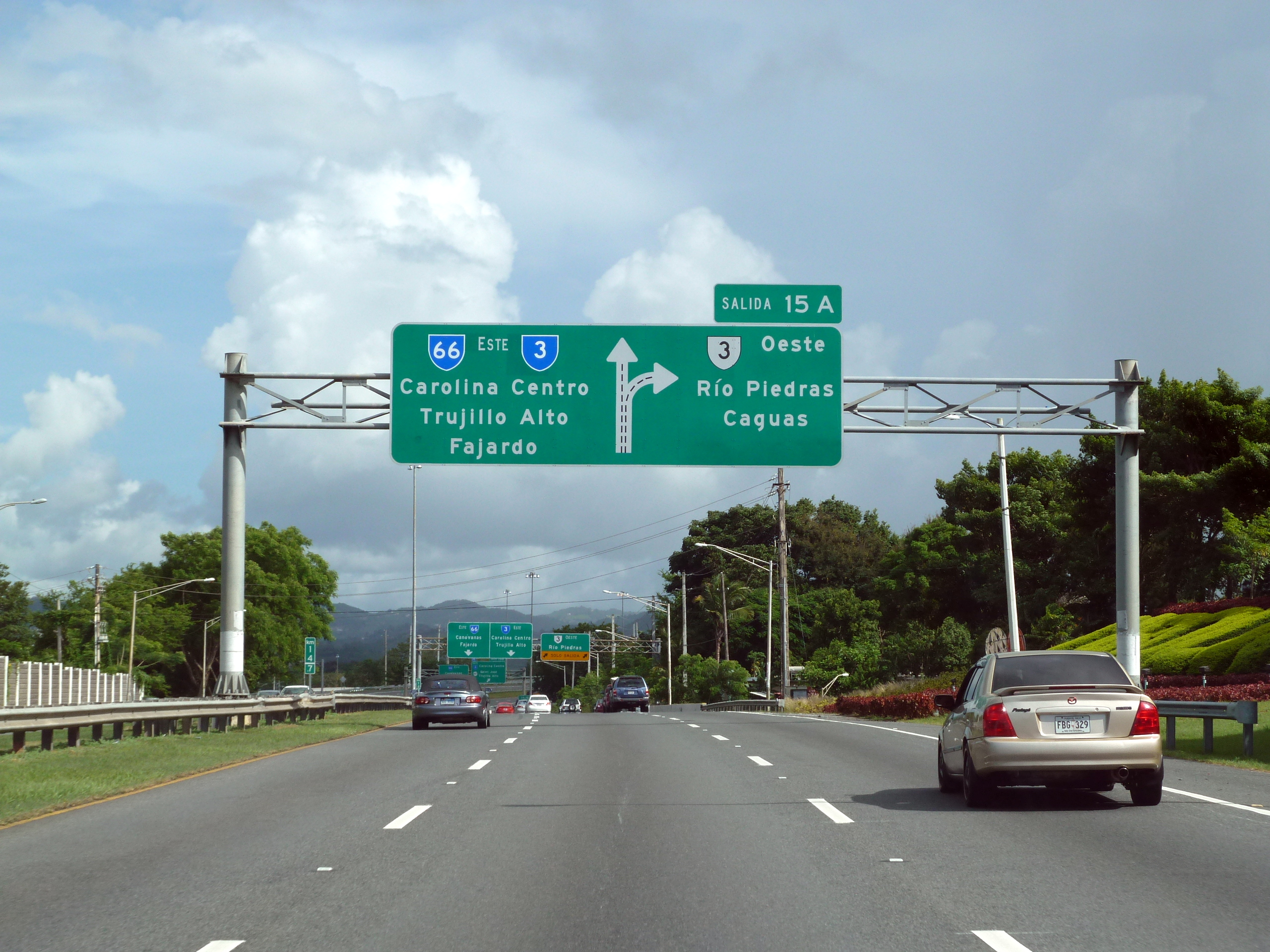
PR-26 towards PR-66 and PR-3

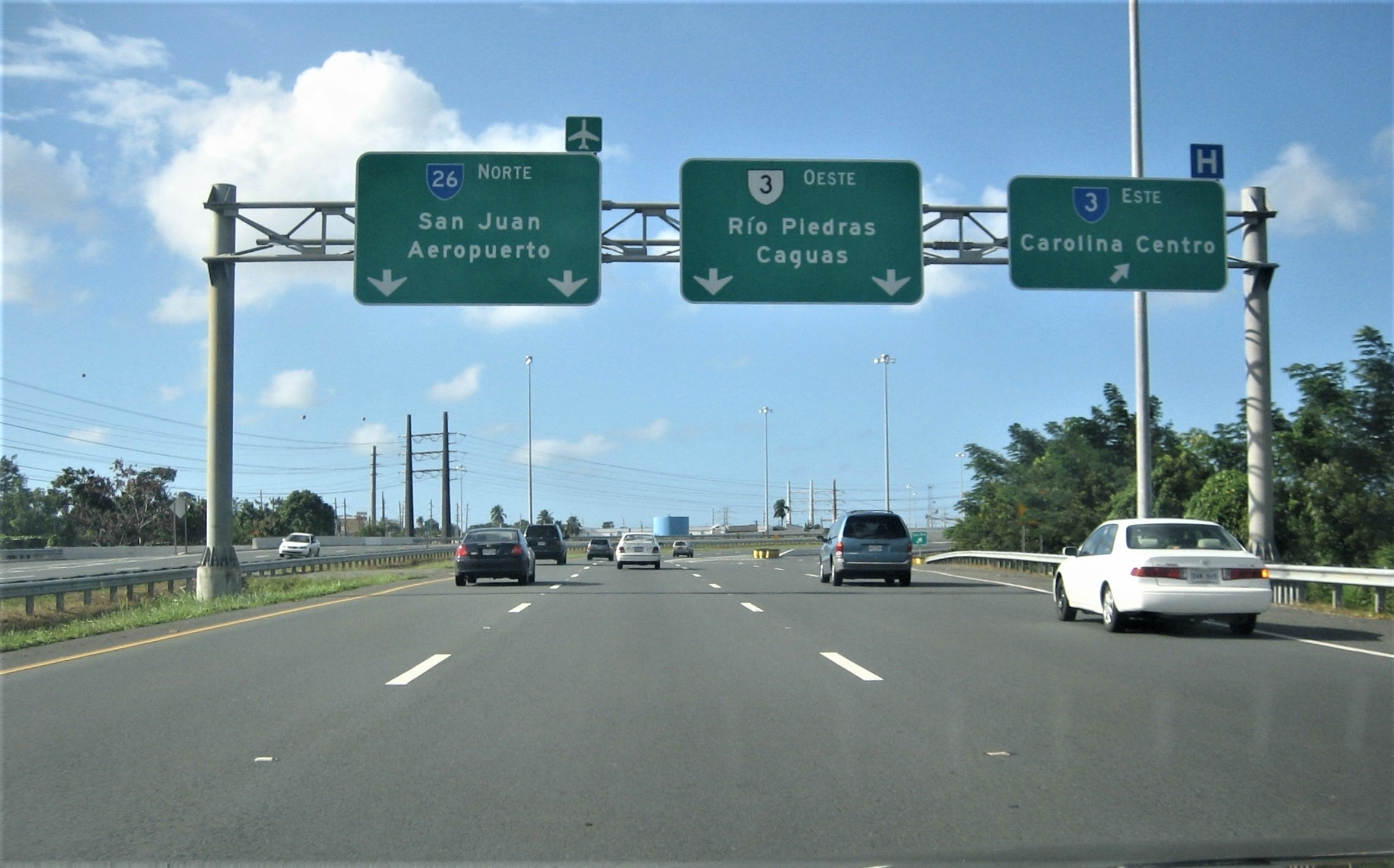
Puerto Rico Highway 66 becomes PR-26 in Carolina after the exit to PR-3

Municipality	Location	km	mi	Exit	Destinations	Notes
San Juan	Santurce	0.0	0.0	—	PR-1 north (Avenida Luis Muñoz Rivera) – San Juan	Western terminus of PR-26
San Juan	Santurce	0.3	0.19	—	PR-Marginal Román Baldorioty de Castro – Santurce	Eastbound exit only; one-way street
San Juan	Santurce	1.4– 1.5	0.87– 0.93	1	PR-2 west (Avenida Roberto H. Todd) – Condado, Parada 18	Eastbound exit signed as 1A
San Juan	Santurce	1.7– 1.8	1.1– 1.1	1B	PR-Calle Canals – Condado, Parada 19	Eastbound exit only; one-way street
San Juan	Santurce	2.0– 2.1	1.2– 1.3	2A	PR-22 west (Autopista José de Diego) – Bayamón, Arecibo, Mayagüez To PR-18 (Expreso Las Américas) – Río Piedras, Caguas, Ponce	Túnel Minillas
San Juan	Santurce	2.3– 2.4	1.4– 1.5	2B	PR-37 (Avenida José de Diego) / PR-Calle del Parque / PR-Calle San Jorge – Condado, Centro Minillas	
San Juan	Santurce	3.0– 4.1	1.9– 2.5	4	PR-Calle Degetau / PR-Calle Providencia / PR-Calle Tapia – Ocean Park	Westbound exit signed as 4A
San Juan	Santurce	4.6	2.9	4B	To PR-37 (Calle Loíza) / PR-Calle Providencia – Villa Palmeras	Westbound exit only
Carolina	Cangrejo Arriba	5.4	3.4	5	To PR-37 – Isla Verde, Punta Las Marías	Westbound exit only
Carolina	Cangrejo Arriba	5.5– 6.5	3.4– 4.0	6	To PR-37 / PR-Marginal Villamar – Isla Verde	
Carolina	Cangrejo Arriba	7.3	4.5	7	PR-187 east (Avenida Los Gobernadores) – Isla Verde, Loíza, Piñones	
Carolina	Cangrejo Arriba	7.7	4.8	8A	PR-17 west (Puente Teodoro Moscoso) – Río Piedras, Trujillo Alto	Toll bridge
Carolina	Cangrejo Arriba	7.7	4.8	8B	PR-Avenida Salvador V. Caro – Luis Muñoz Marín International Airport	
Carolina	Cangrejo Arriba	9.1	5.7	9	PR-Avenida Los Ángeles – Carolina	Eastbound exit signed as 9A
Carolina	Cangrejo Arriba	9.5	5.9	9B	PR-Marginal Los Ángeles – Carolina	Eastbound exit only
Carolina	Cangrejo Arriba	11.1– 11.2	6.9– 7.0	11	PR-190 / PR-Avenida Iturregui – Base Muñiz, Vistamar	Eastbound exit and westbound entrance
Carolina	Sabana Abajo	12.5	7.8	12	PR-Avenida Roberto Sánchez Vilella – Carolina, Country Club	Eastbound exits are signed as 12A (west) and 12B (east)
Carolina	Sabana Abajo	13.6	8.5	13	To PR-190 / PR-Avenida Paseo de los Gigantes – Carolina	Eastbound exits are signed as 13A (west) and 13B (east)
Carolina	Sabana Abajo	14.8– 14.9	9.2– 9.3	14	PR-Avenida Jesús M. Fragoso – Carolina	Eastbound exit and entrance
Carolina	San Antón	15.1	9.4	15A	PR-3 west (Avenida 65 de Infantería) – Río Piedras, Caguas	Eastern terminus of PR-26
Carolina	San Antón	15.1	9.4	15B	PR-3 east (Avenida 65 de Infantería) – Carolina PR-66 east (Autopista Roberto Sánchez Vilella) / PR-887 – Canóvanas, Fajardo, Trujillo Alto, Saint Just	Eastern terminus of PR-26
1.000 mi = 1.609 km; 1.000 km = 0.621 mi: Incomplete access; Tolled

== See also ==
- Interstate Highways in Puerto Rico
