= Puerto Rico Highway 37 =

Highway in Puerto Rico

Highway 37
- Ruta 37

Route information
- Maintained by Puerto Rico DTPW
- Length: 6.8 km (4.2 mi)

Major junctions
- West end: PR-35 in Santurce
- PR-25 in Santurce; PR-26 in Santurce
- East end: PR-187 in Cangrejo Arriba

Location
- Country: United States
- Territory: Puerto Rico
- Municipalities: San Juan, Carolina

Highway system
- Roads in Puerto Rico; List
← PR-36	→ PR-38

Puerto Rico Highway 37 (PR-37) is an urban road between San Juan (in Santurce area) and Carolina (in Isla Verde area). In Santurce is known as Calle Loíza and the Isla Verde area is known as Avenida Isla Verde.

== Route description ==
It is the main road in Isla Verde. The hotel zone of Isla Verde is located on this road and is located near Luis Muñoz Marín International Airport. Also, on this road lies the Luis Llorens Torres public housing.

Among their intersections are the PR-187, to Piñones (tourist area of Loíza), PR-26 (Expreso Baldorioty de Castro), PR-25 (Avenida Juan Ponce de León) and PR-35 (Avenida Manuel Fernández Juncos). Near PR-37 is PR-22 (Autopista José de Diego), which can be accessed from this road.

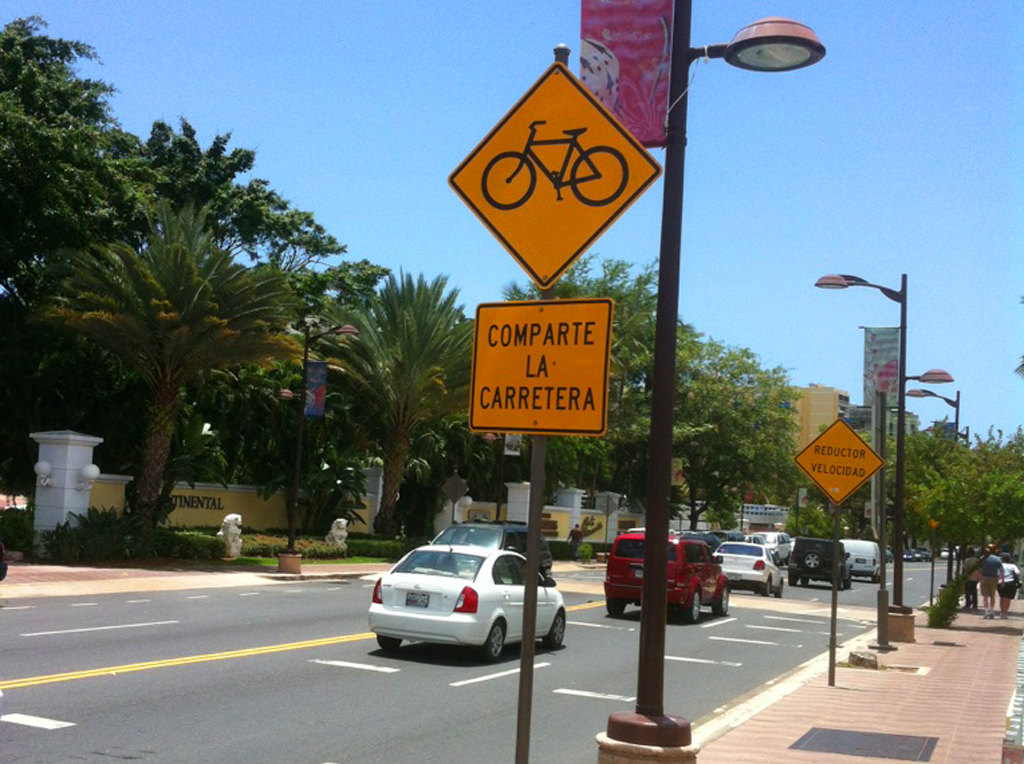
PR-37 in Isla Verde

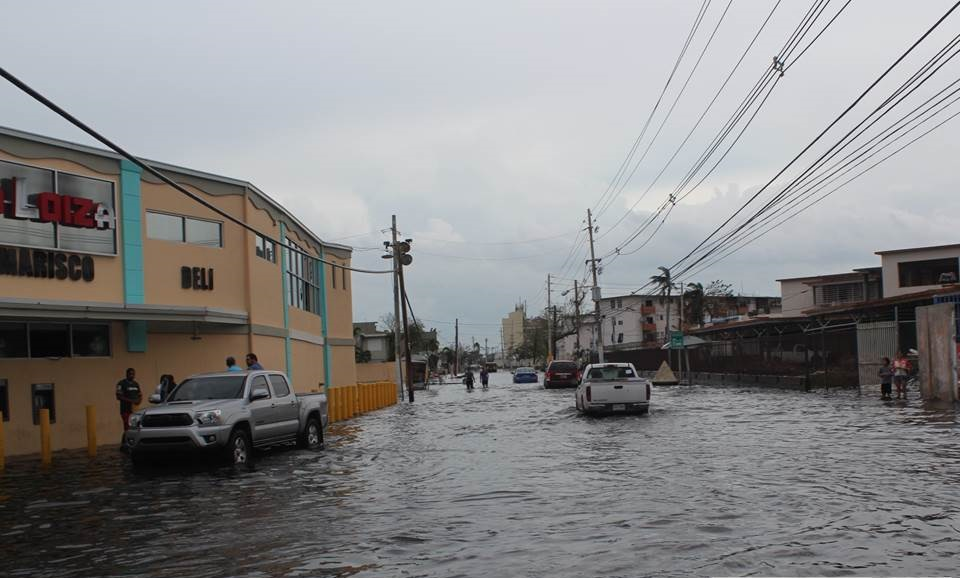
Flooding on Calle Loíza due to Hurricane Maria in 2017

== Major intersections ==
Municipality	Location	km	mi	Destinations	Notes
San Juan	Santurce	0.0	0.0	PR-35 south (Avenida Manuel Fernández Juncos) – Hato Rey, Río Piedras	Western terminus of PR-37; one-way street
San Juan	Santurce	0.2	0.12	PR-25 north (Avenida Juan Ponce de León) – San Juan	One-way street
San Juan	Santurce	0.7	0.43	PR-26 (Expreso Román Baldorioty de Castro) – San Juan, Carolina To PR-22 west (Autopista José de Diego) – Bayamón	PR-26 exit 2B; diamond interchange
San Juan	Santurce	1.0– 1.1	0.62– 0.68	PR-Avenida José de Diego / PR-Avenida Wilson / PR-Calle Loíza – Santurce	Northern terminus of PR-37 through Avenida José de Diego; western terminus of PR-37 through Calle Loíza
San Juan	Santurce	1.3	0.81	PR-Calle San Jorge / PR-Kings Court – Santurce	
Carolina	Cangrejo Arriba	4.6	2.9	To PR-26 (Expreso Román Baldorioty de Castro) / PR-Marginal Villamar – Isla Verde	
Carolina	Cangrejo Arriba	6.8	4.2	PR-187 to PR-26 (Expreso Román Baldorioty de Castro) – Carolina, Loíza	Eastern terminus of PR-37
1.000 mi = 1.609 km; 1.000 km = 0.621 mi: Route transition
