= Guzmán Abajo =

Barrio of Río Grande, Puerto Rico

- Barrio
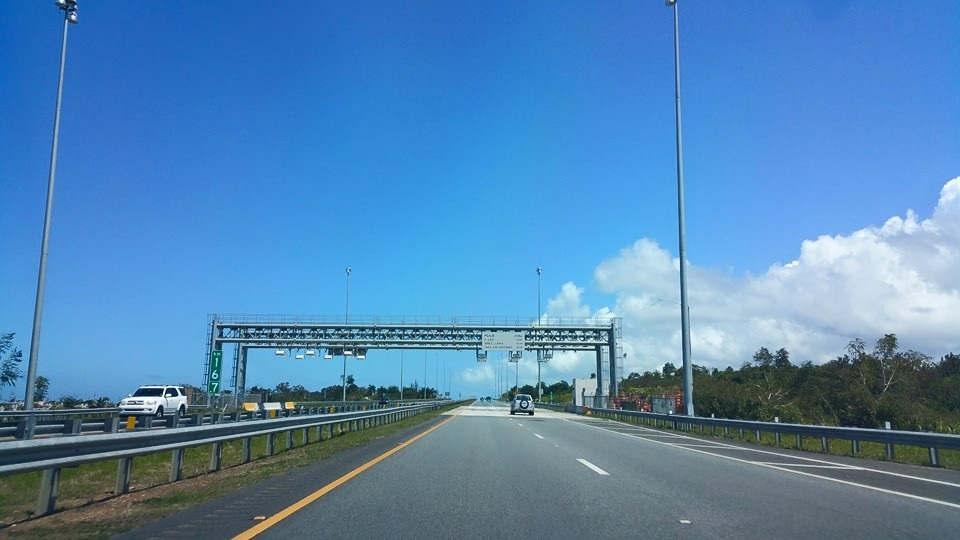
- Puerto Rico Highway 66 in Guzmán Abajo

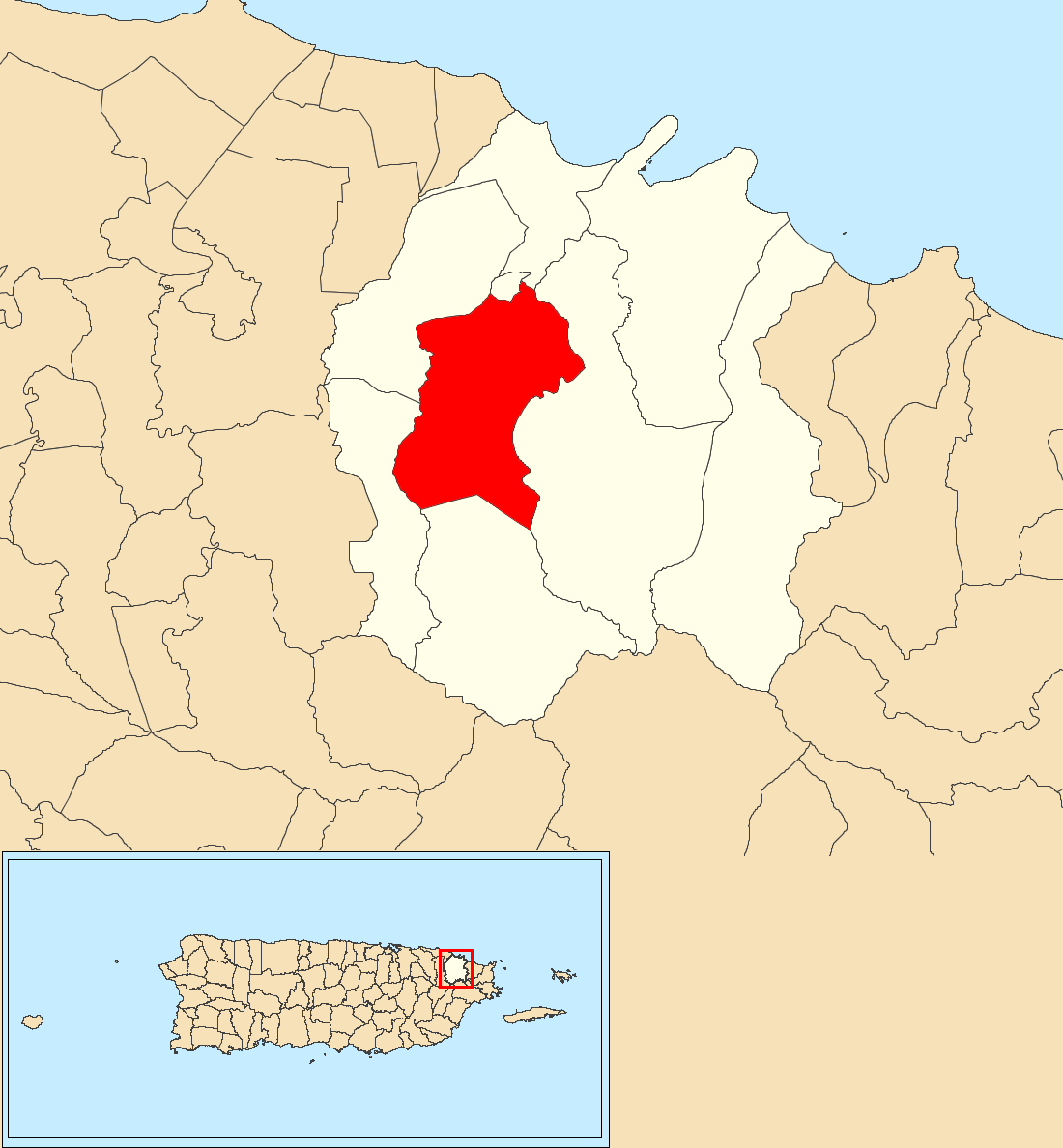
- Location of Guzmán Abajo within the municipality of Río Grande shown in red

- Location of Puerto Rico
- Coordinates: 18°21′17″N 65°50′42″W
- Commonwealth: Puerto Rico
- Municipality: Río Grande

Area
  - Total: 7.14 sq mi (18.5 km^{2})
  - Land: 7.12 sq mi (18.4 km^{2})
  - Water: 0.02 sq mi (0.052 km^{2})
- Elevation: 98 ft (30 m)

Population (2010)
  - Total: 7,367
  - Density: 1,034.7/sq mi (399.5/km^{2})
- Source: 2010 Census
- Time zone: UTC−4 (AST)

Guzmán Abajo is a barrio in the municipality of Río Grande, Puerto Rico. Its population in 2010 was 7,367.

== History ==
Guzmán Abajo was in Spain's gazetteers until Puerto Rico was ceded by Spain in the aftermath of the Spanish–American War under the terms of the Treaty of Paris of 1898 and became an unincorporated territory of the United States. In 1899, the United States Department of War conducted a census of Puerto Rico finding that the population of Guzmán Abajo barrio was 1,378.

Lilium, a small fragrant flower, has been cultivated in Guzmán Abajo for generations.

Historical population
Census	Pop.	Note	%±
1900	1,378		—
1910	1,406		2.0%
1920	1,728		22.9%
1930	1,750		1.3%
1940	2,166		23.8%
1950	2,775		28.1%
1960	2,099		−24.4%
1970	0		−100.0%
1980	3,520		—
1990	6,205		76.3%
2000	6,614		6.6%
2010	7,367		11.4%
U.S. Decennial Census; 1899 (shown as 1900) 1910-1930; 1930-1950 1980-2000 2010

== Sectors ==
Barrios (which are, in contemporary times, roughly comparable to minor civil divisions) in turn are further subdivided into smaller local populated place areas/units called sectores (sectors in English). The types of sectores may vary, from normally sector to urbanización to reparto to barriada to residencial, among others.

The following sectors are in Guzmán Abajo barrio:

Apartamentos Lomas de Río Grande, Comunidad Bartolo (Sosa), Comunidad Medero, Río Grande Elderly Apartments, Sector Báez, Sector La Vega de Guzmán, Sector Los Quianes, Sector Márquez, Sector Serra, Sector Vista Azul, Urbanización Jardines de Villa Paola, Urbanización Miramelinda, Urbanización Riveras de Río Grande, and Urbanización Vistas del Mar.

In Guzmán Abajo is the Bartolo comunidad, and part of the Río Grande urban area.

== See also ==
- List of communities in Puerto Rico
- List of barrios and sectors of Río Grande, Puerto Rico
