= San Antón, Carolina, Puerto Rico =

Barrio of Puerto Rico

San Antón
- Barrio
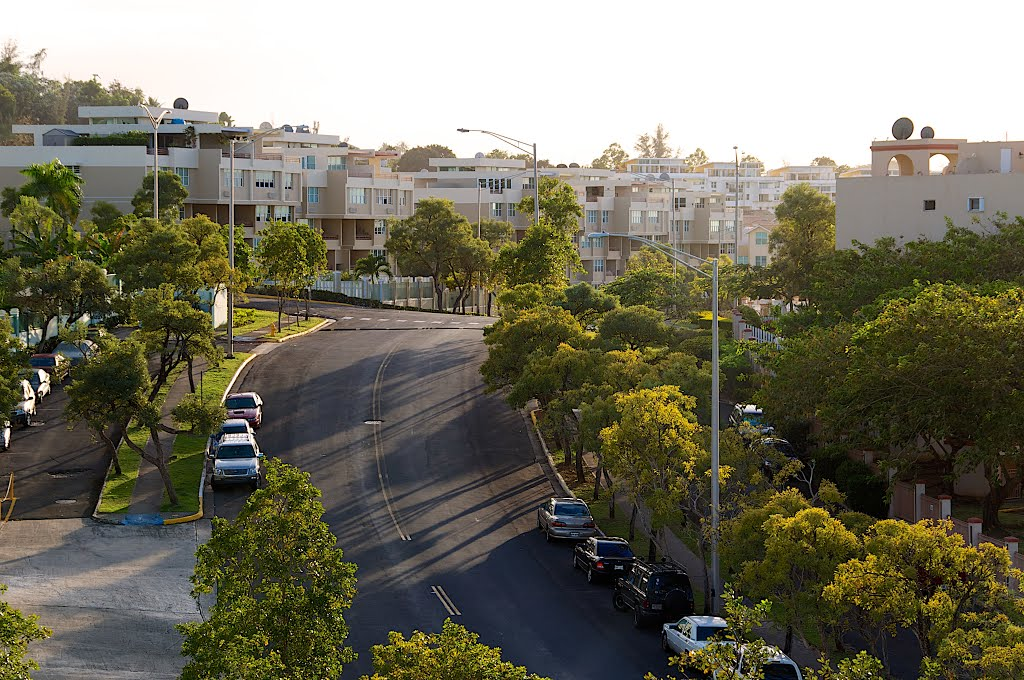
- Parque Escorial suburbs in San Antón

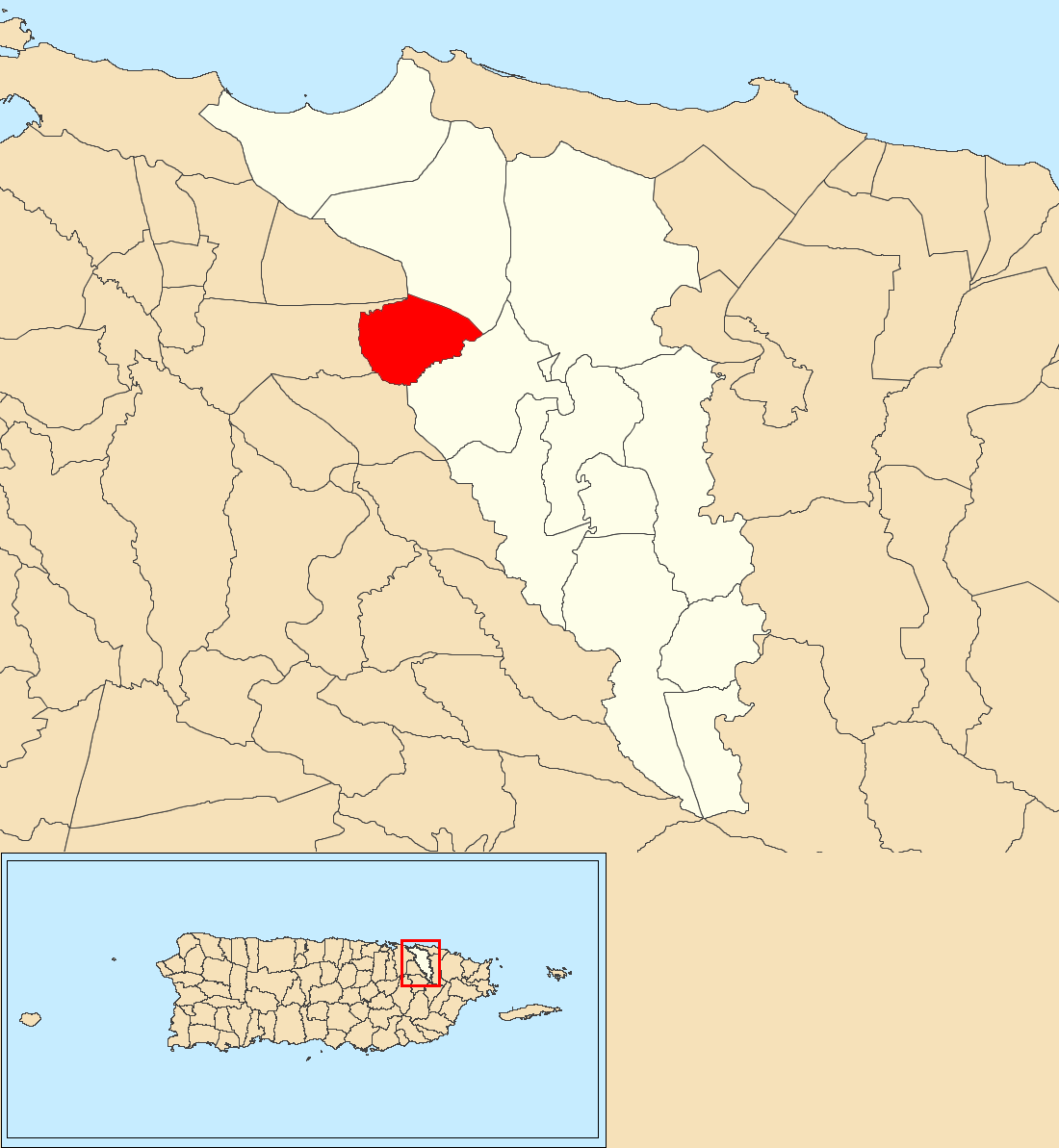
- Location of San Antón within the municipality of Carolina shown in red

- Location of Puerto Rico
- Coordinates: 18°23′15″N 65°59′34″W
- Commonwealth: Puerto Rico
- Municipality: Carolina

Area
  - Total: 1.91 sq mi (4.9 km^{2})
  - Land: 1.91 sq mi (4.9 km^{2})
  - Water: 0 sq mi (0 km^{2})
- Elevation: 266 ft (81 m)

Population (2010)
  - Total: 13,578
  - Density: 7,146.3/sq mi (2,759.2/km^{2})
- Source: 2010 Census
- Time zone: UTC−4 (AST)

San Antón is a barrio in the municipality of Carolina, Puerto Rico. Its population in 2010 was 13,578.

== History ==
San Antón was in Spain's gazetteers until Puerto Rico was ceded by Spain in the aftermath of the Spanish–American War under the terms of the Treaty of Paris of 1898 and became an unincorporated territory of the United States. In 1899, the United States Department of War conducted a census of Puerto Rico finding that the population of San Antonio barrio (as it was called then) was 615.

San Antón saw a 21.7% increase in population from 1990 to 2000 and a 29.7% increase from 2000 to 2010.

Historical population
| Census | Pop. | Note | %± |
|---|---|---|---|
| 1900 | 615 | | — |
| 1910 | 709 | | 15.3% |
| 1920 | 780 | | 10.0% |
| 1930 | 797 | | 2.2% |
| 1940 | 2,290 | | 187.3% |
| 1950 | 3,138 | | 37.0% |
| 1960 | 4,338 | | 38.2% |
| 1970 | 0 | | −100.0% |
| 1980 | 7,414 | | — |
| 1990 | 8,598 | | 16.0% |
| 2000 | 10,465 | | 21.7% |
| 2010 | 13,578 | | 29.7% |
U.S. Decennial Census; 1899 (shown as 1900) 1910-1930; 1930-1950 1980-2000 2010

== Gallery ==
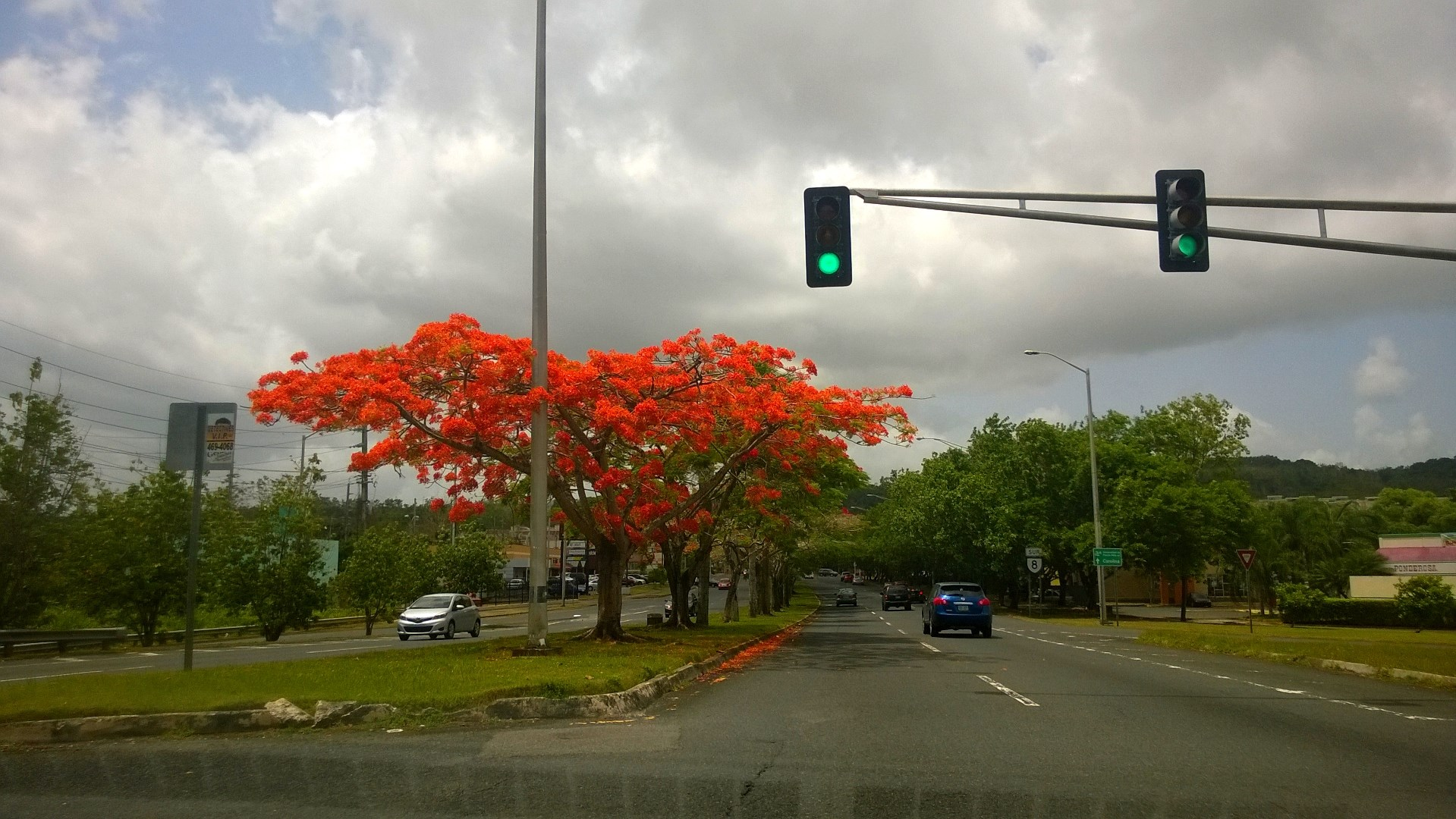
Puerto Rico Highway 8 in San Antón

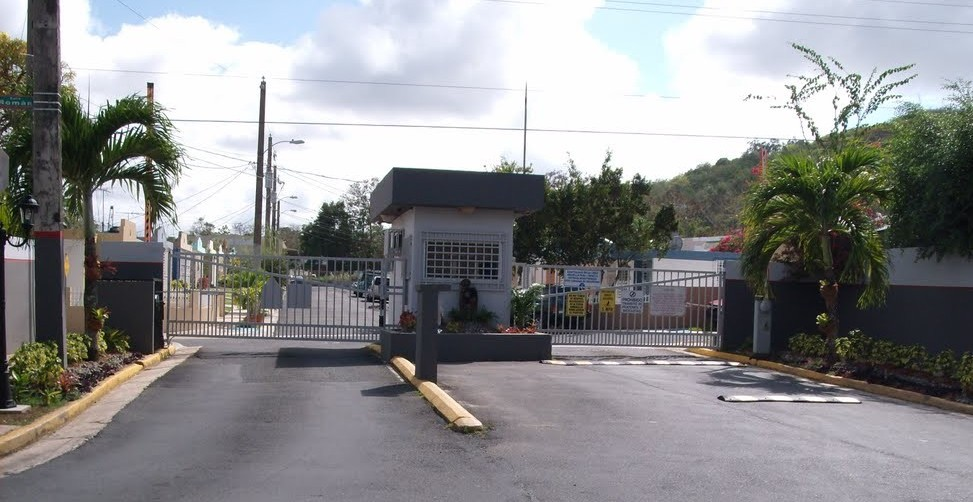
Ciudad Central entrance

== See also ==
- List of communities in Puerto Rico
