= Cangrejo Arriba, Carolina, Puerto Rico =

Barrio of Puerto Rico

Cangrejo Arriba
- Barrio
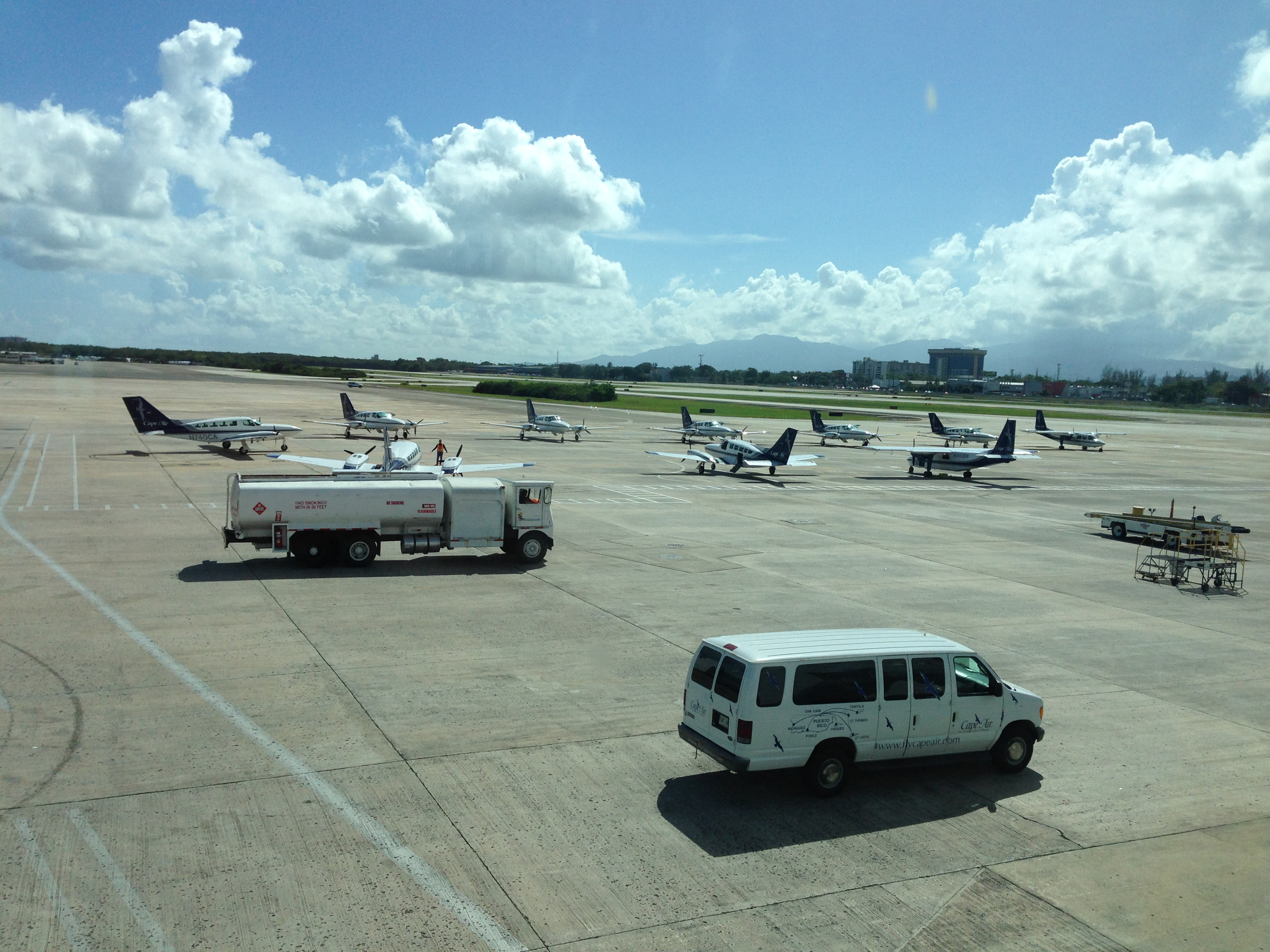
- Near the United States Postal Service cargo area of the Luis Muñoz Marín Airport in Cangrejo Arriba

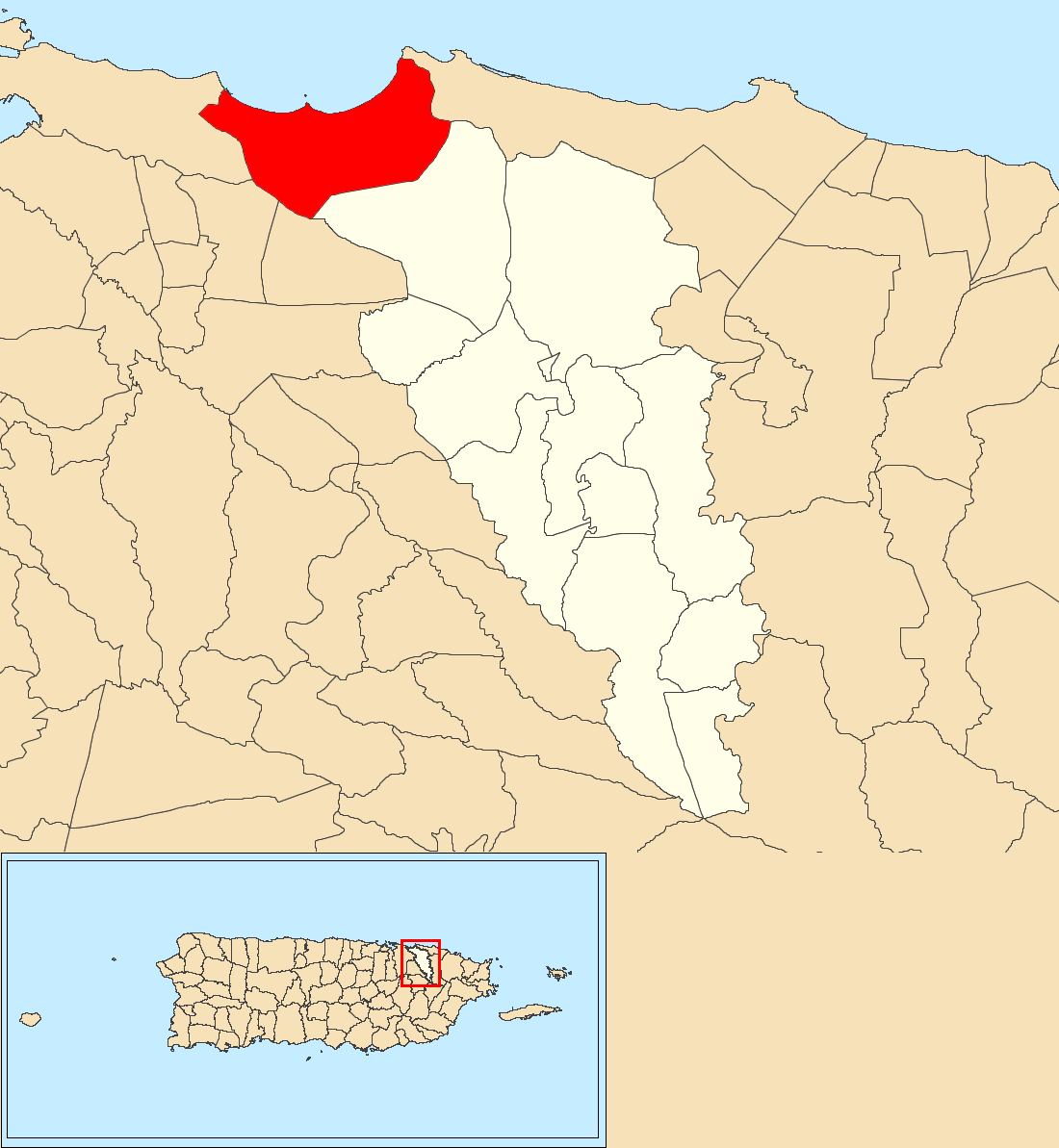
- Location of Cangrejo Arriba within the municipality of Carolina shown in red

- Location of Puerto Rico
- Coordinates: 18°26′18″N 65°59′57″W
- Commonwealth: Puerto Rico
- Municipality: Carolina

Area
  - Total: 6.72 sq mi (17.4 km^{2})
  - Land: 3.89 sq mi (10.1 km^{2})
  - Water: 2.83 sq mi (7.3 km^{2})
- Elevation: 10 ft (3.0 m)

Population (2010)
  - Total: 17,041
  - Density: 4,414.8/sq mi (1,704.6/km^{2})
- Source: 2010 Census
- Time zone: UTC−4 (AST)

Cangrego Arriba is a barrio in the municipality of Carolina, Puerto Rico with a population of 17,041 in 2010.

== Features ==
Cangrego Arriba is an urban area located in Isla Verde a neighborhood on the coast.

The Ritz-Carlton hotel in Cangrego Arriba suffered extensive damage due to Hurricane Maria on September 20, 2017 and was scheduled to reopen in 2022.

== History ==
Cangrejo Arriba was in Spain's gazetteers until Puerto Rico was ceded by Spain in the aftermath of the Spanish–American War under the terms of the Treaty of Paris of 1898 and became an unincorporated territory of the United States. In 1899, the United States Department of War conducted a census of Puerto Rico finding that the population of Cangrejos barrio (as it was named at the time) was 367.

Historical population
Census	Pop.	Note	%±
1900	367		—
1910	473		28.9%
1920	637		34.7%
1930	1,159		81.9%
1940	1,639		41.4%
1950	1,501		−8.4%
1960	7,162		377.1%
1970	0		−100.0%
1980	16,237		—
1990	18,869		16.2%
2000	18,681		−1.0%
2010	17,041		−8.8%
U.S. Decennial Census; 1899 (shown as 1900) 1910-1930; 1930-1950 1980-2000 2010

== Gallery ==
Places and views of Cangrego Arriba:

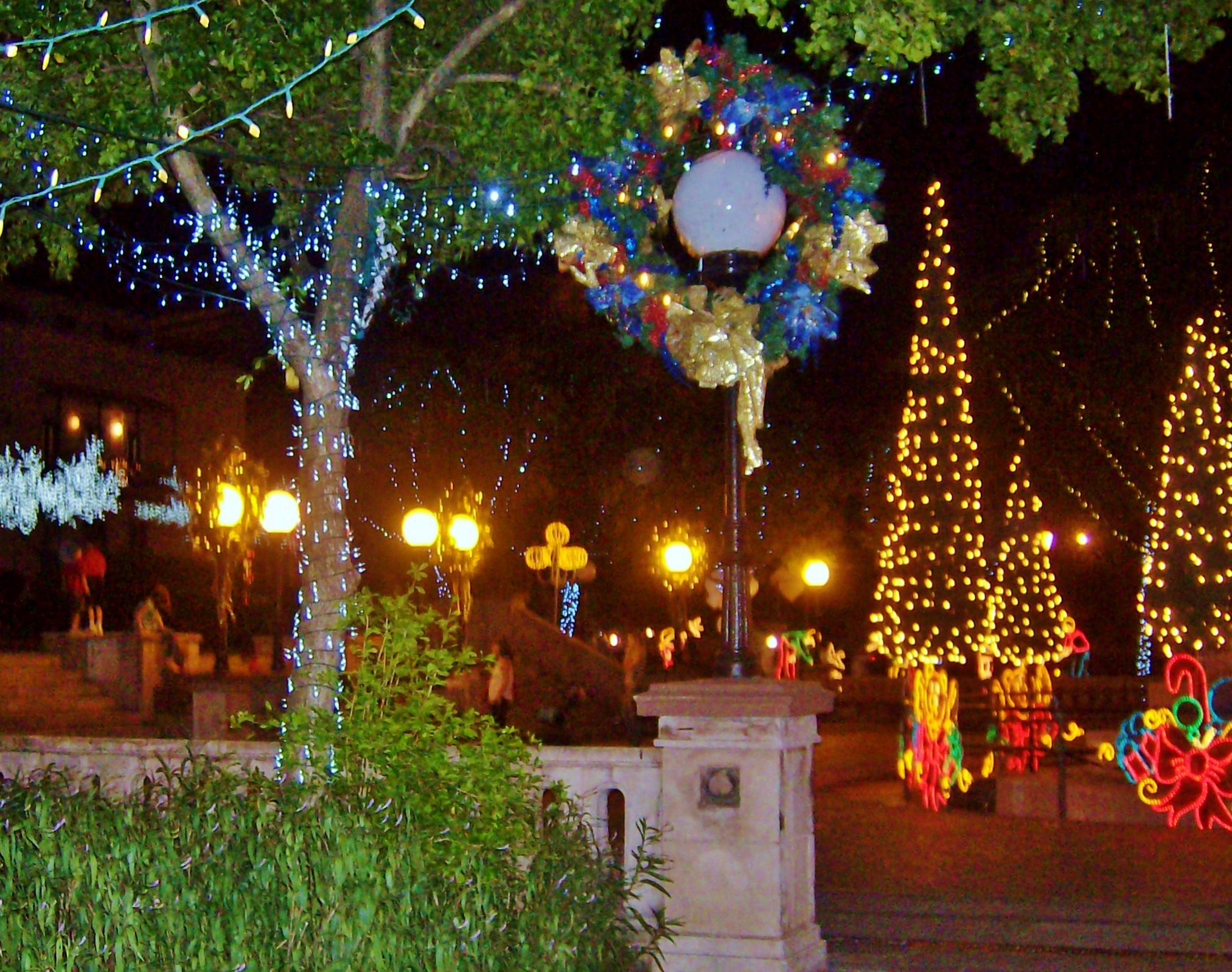
Christmas decorations outside the Ritz Carlton Hotel

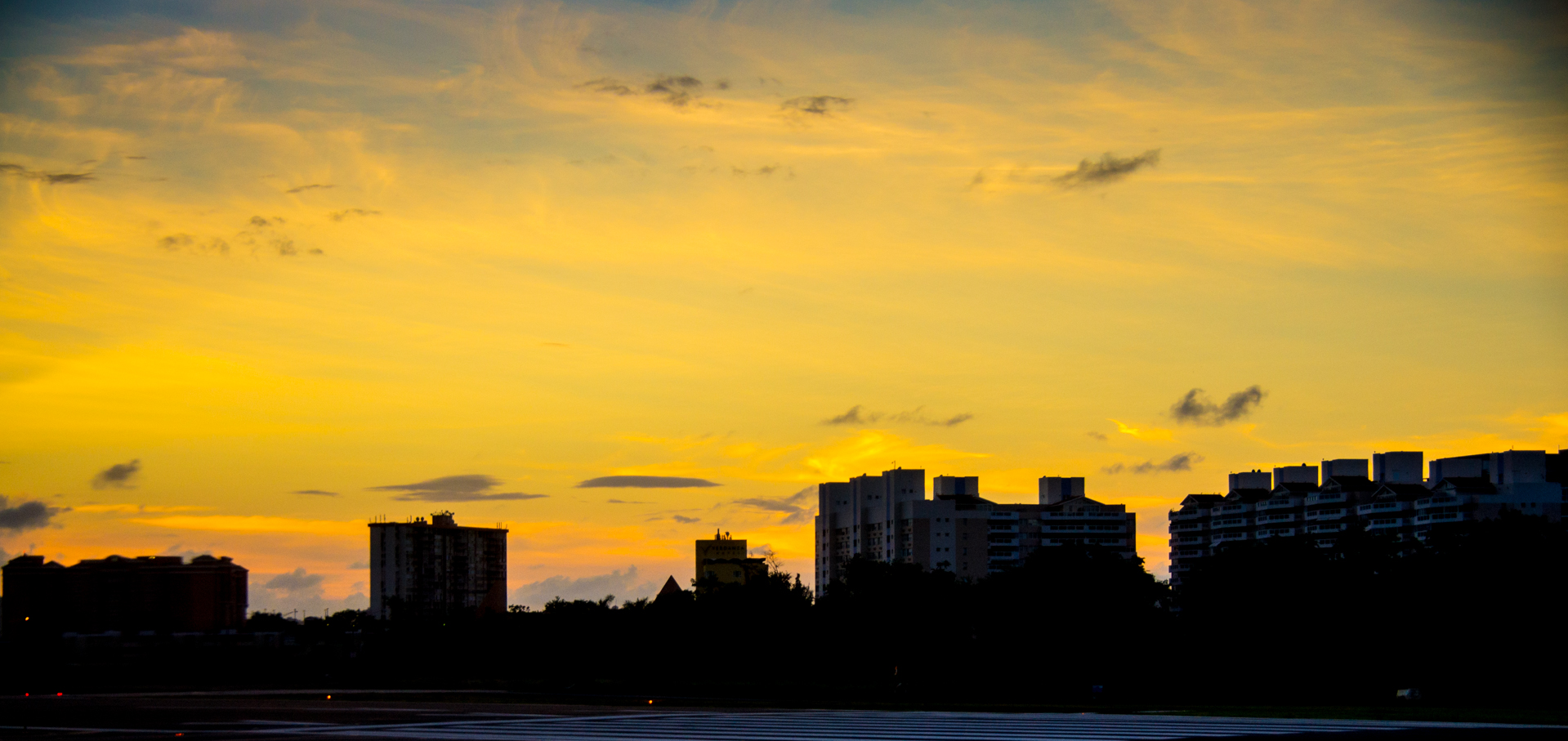
Cangrego Arriba skyline

== See also ==
- List of communities in Puerto Rico
