= Puerto Rico Highway 8 =

Highway in Puerto Rico

Highway 8
- Ruta 8
- Avenida Ramal Este

Route information
- Maintained by Puerto Rico DTPW
- Length: 4.0 km (2.5 mi)

Major junctions
- West end: PR-17 in Oriente
- East end: PR-3 in Sabana Llana Norte–Sabana Llana Sur

Location
- Country: United States
- Territory: Puerto Rico
- Municipalities: San Juan

Highway system
- Roads in Puerto Rico; List
← PR-6	→ PR-9

Puerto Rico Highway 8 (PR-8) is a main highway that serves as a third route from San Juan, Puerto Rico to Carolina, Puerto Rico; the others being PR-3 and PR-26. It is, still, a highly congested highway, noticeable when congestion jams are found on PR-17, where PR-8 begins, and it continues to PR-3. The first kilometers of PR-8 (east of PR-17) were known before as Puerto Rico Highway 4, but the Department of Transportation renumbered the entire highway PR-8 and there is no longer a PR-4. It ends at PR-3 near Carolina with a length of about 4.0 kilometers (2.5 mi).

== Route description ==
Puerto Rico Highway 8 begins at PR-17 interchange in Oriente, just south of the Teodoro Moscoso Bridge and west of the Mall of San Juan, with two lanes per direction. Then, the route goes to the east through Sabana Llana Norte just before Avenida Iturregui intersection, where it turns southeast until its eastern terminus at PR-3 interchange between Sabana Llana Norte and Sabana Llana Sur. Beyond its eastern terminus, the avenue continues south until its terminus in Parque Escorial, a neighborhood development located in San Antón, Carolina. In this segment, the road has three lanes per direction.

Puerto Rico Highway 8

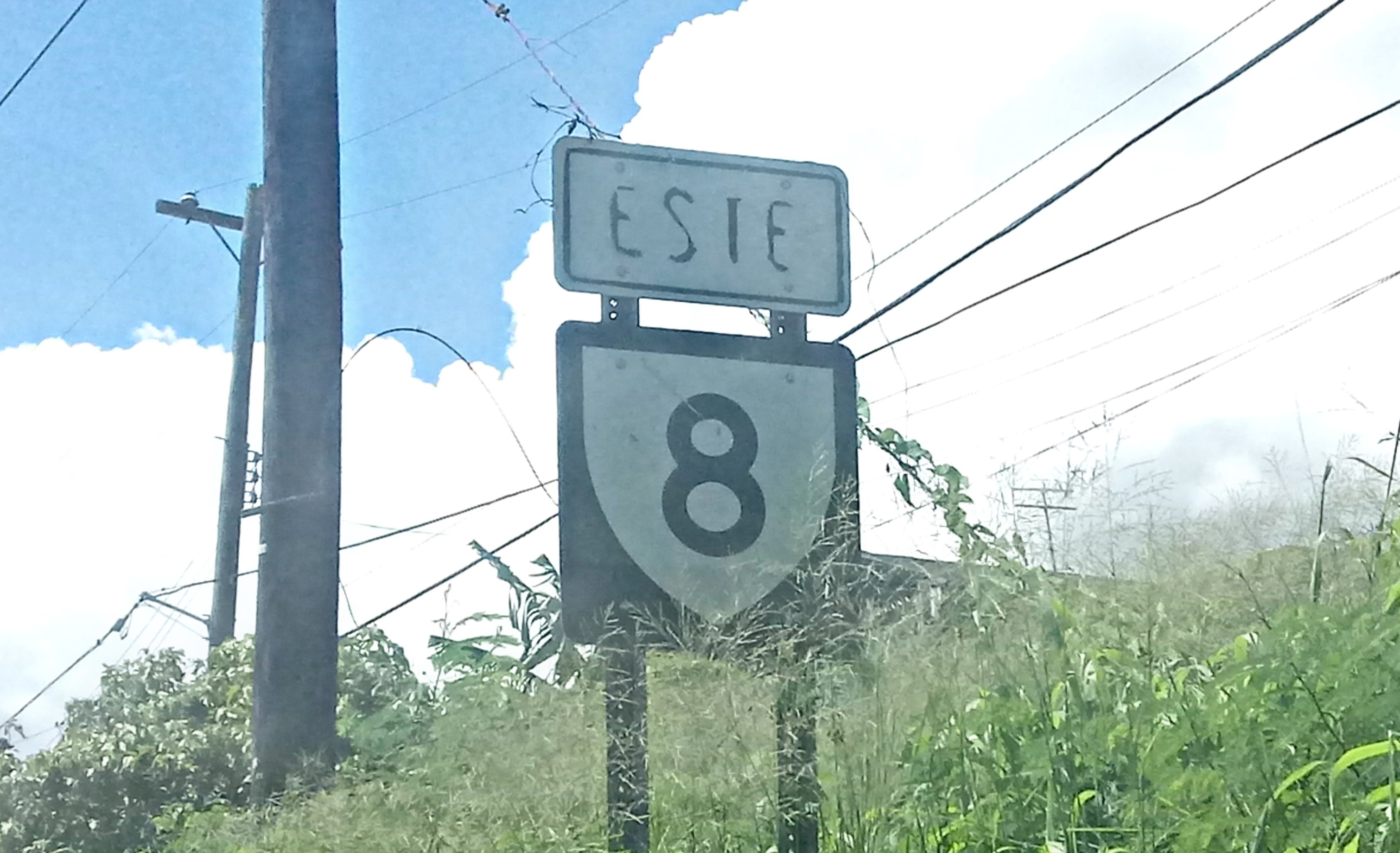
Eastbound sign near the Mall of San Juan

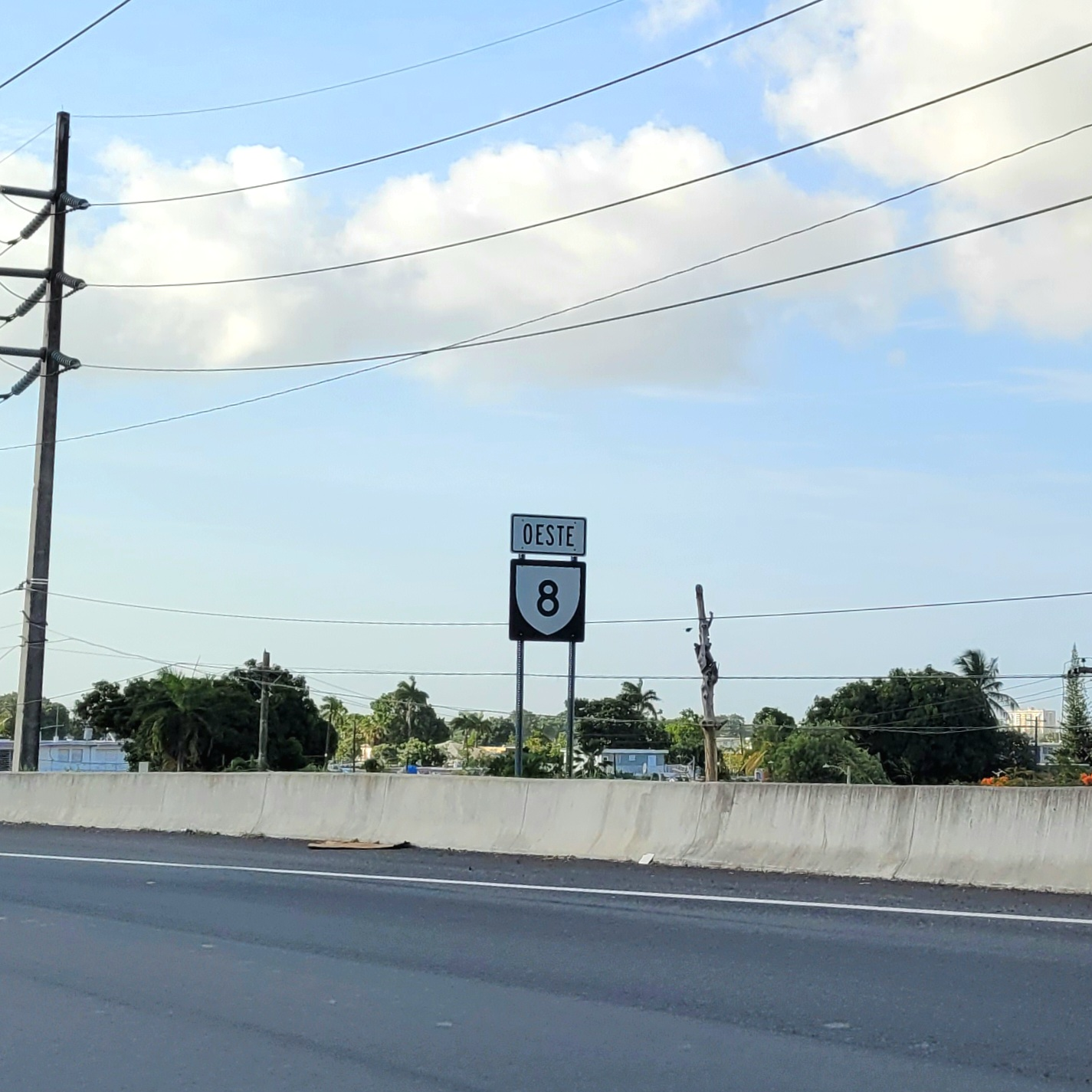
Westbound sign near Parque Escorial

== Major intersections ==
The entire route is located in San Juan.

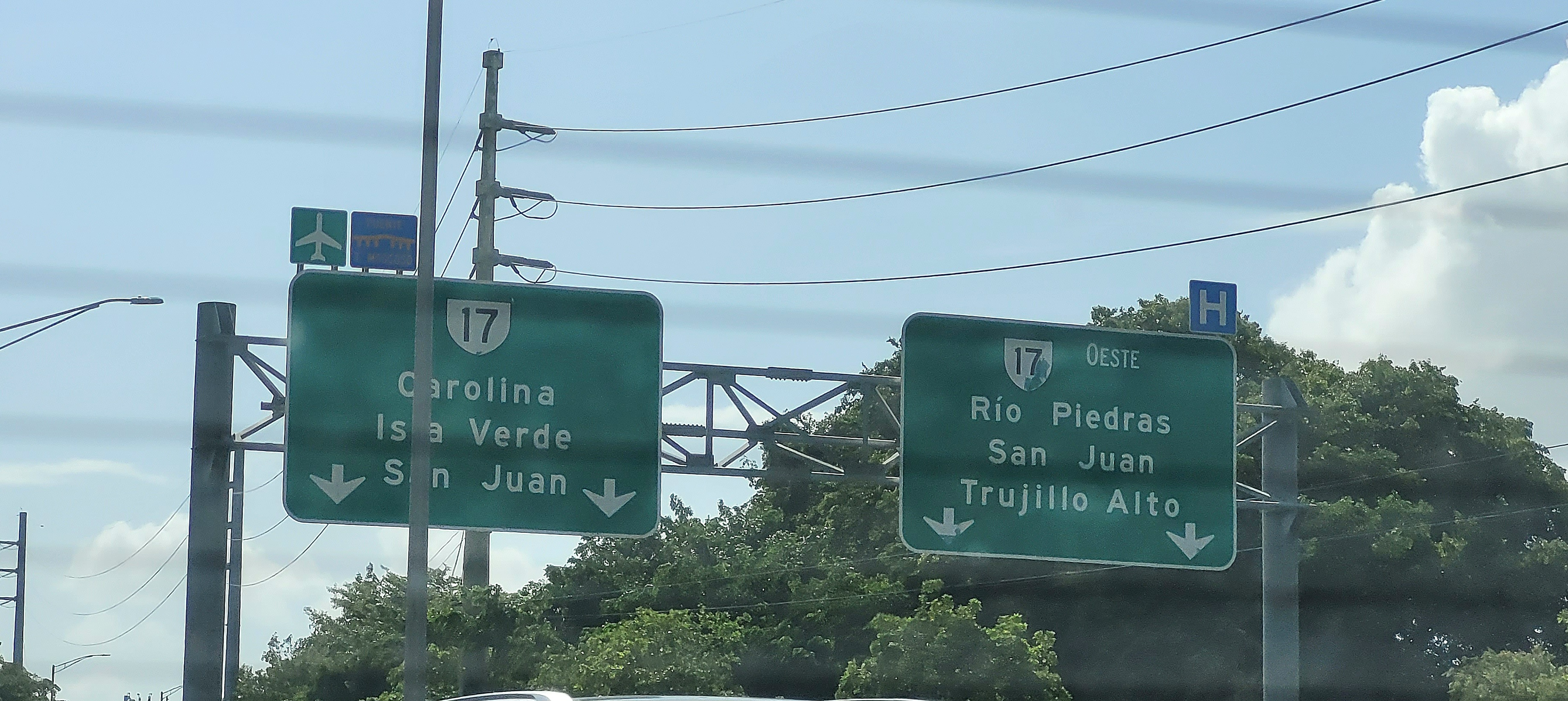
PR-8 west at PR-17 interchange

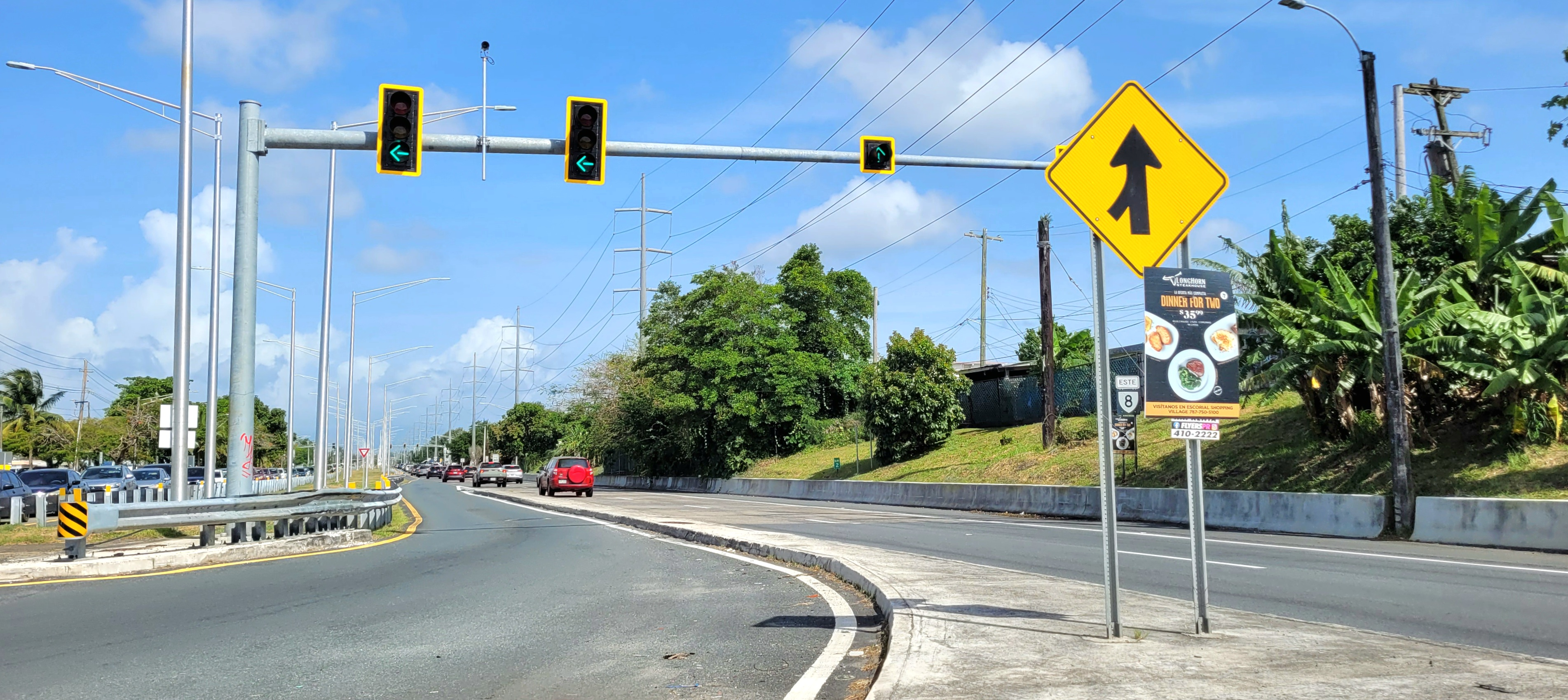
PR-8 east at Avenida Iturregui intersection

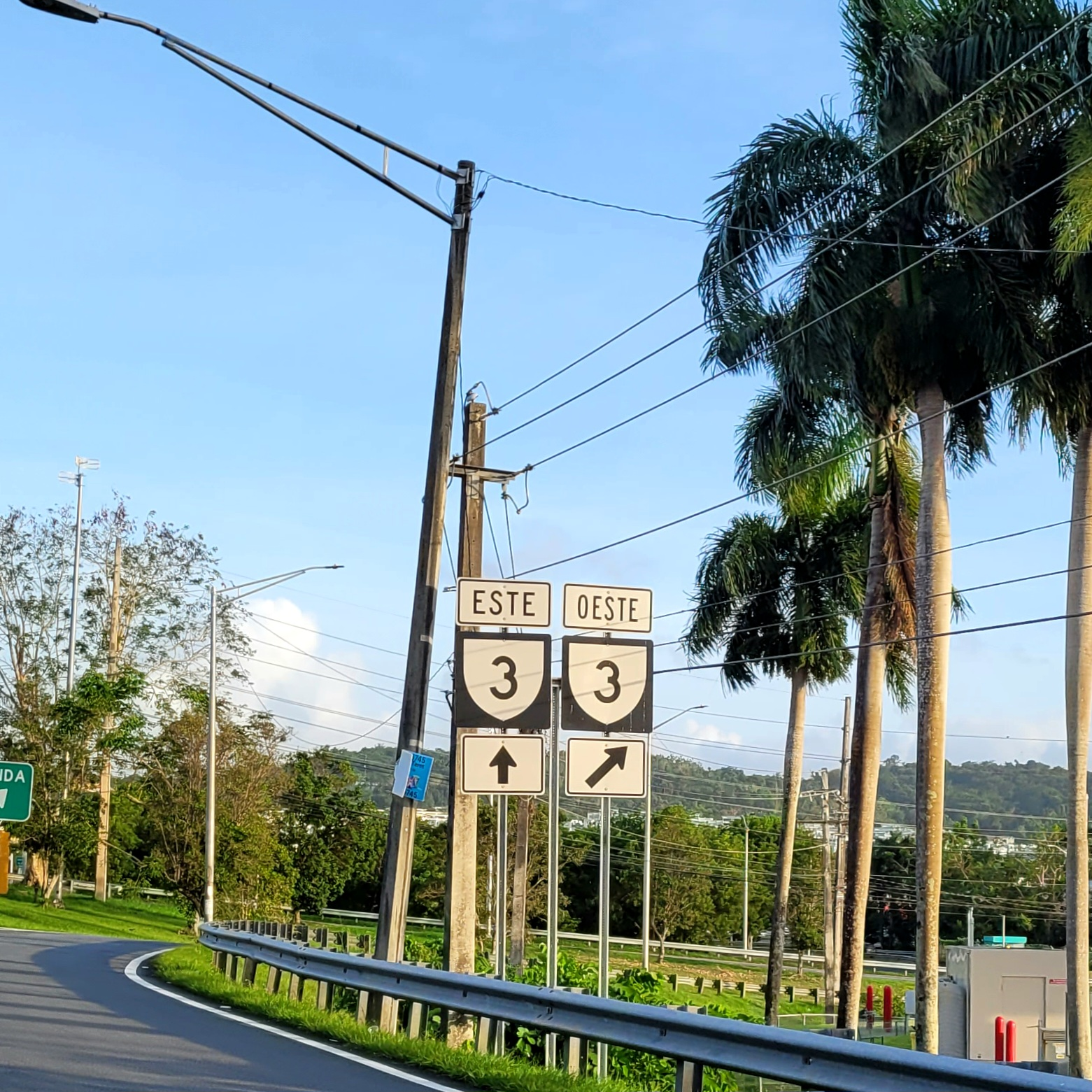
PR-8 east at PR-3 interchange

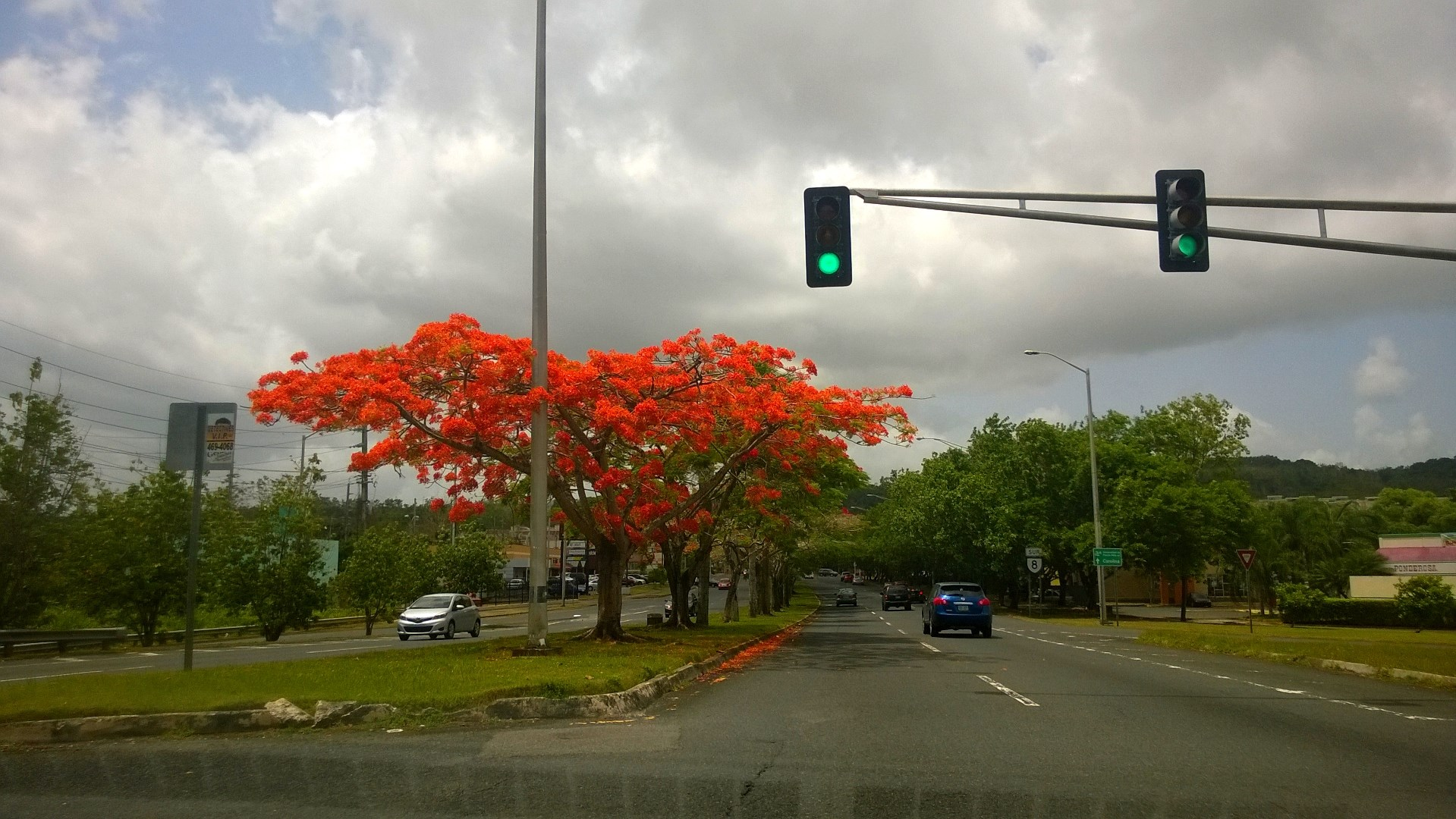
Eastern terminus of PR-8 at PR-3 interchange between San Juan and Carolina

Location	km	mi	Destinations	Notes
Oriente	0.0	0.0	PR-17 (Expreso Jesús T. Piñero) – San Juan, Carolina, SJU Airport	Western terminus of PR-8; trumpet interchange
Sabana Llana Norte	0.5	0.31	PR-The Mall of San Juan Boulevard – The Mall of San Juan	Seagull intersection
Sabana Llana Norte	0.8	0.50	PR-Avenida Simón Madera – Río Piedras	
Sabana Llana Norte	1.9– 2.0	1.2– 1.2	PR-Avenida Iturregui – Carolina	Seagull intersection
Sabana Llana Norte	2.3	1.4	PR-Calle Vinyater – Country Club	
Sabana Llana Norte	2.9	1.8	PR-Avenida Roberto Sánchez Vilella – Río Piedras, Carolina	
Sabana Llana Norte	3.6– 3.7	2.2– 2.3	PR-Avenida Antonio Luciano / PR-Calle James Bond – Country Club, El Comandante	
Sabana Llana Norte–Sabana Llana Sur line	4.0	2.5	PR-3 (Avenida 65 de Infantería) – Río Piedras, Carolina	Partial cloverleaf interchange
1.000 mi = 1.609 km; 1.000 km = 0.621 mi
