= Martín Peña =

Martín Peña may refer to:

- Martín Peña (Hato Rey), one of the 12 sectors of Hato Rey, Puerto Rico
- Martín Peña (Santurce), one of the forty sectors of Santurce, San Juan, Puerto Rico
- Martín Peña Channel, a body of water in San Juan, Puerto Rico
