= Caño Martín Peña Nature Reserve =

Nature reserve in San Juan, Puerto Rico

- Reserva Natural Caño Martín Peña
- IUCN category IV (habitat/species management area)
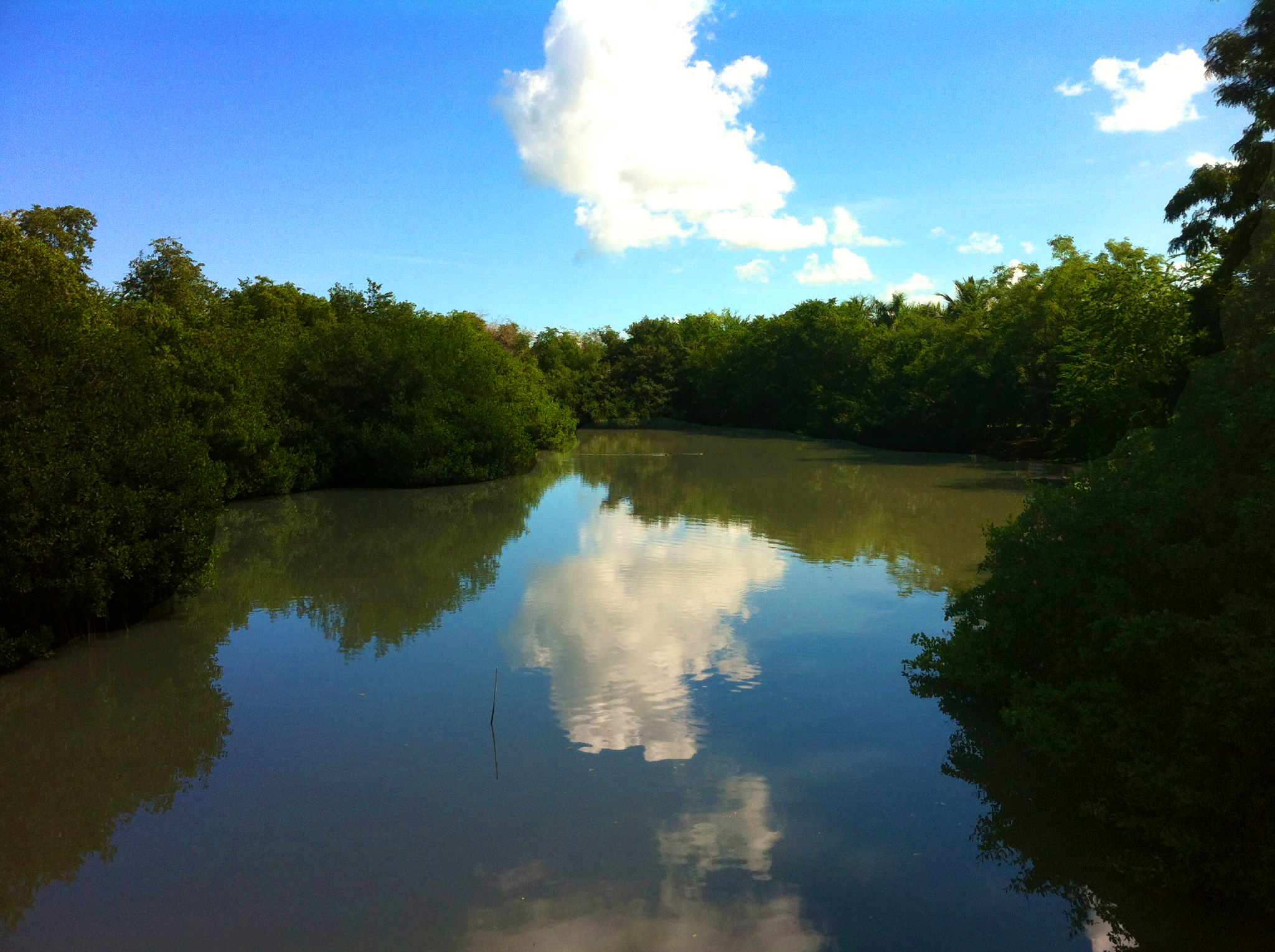
- Mangrove forest at the Caño Martín Peña Nature Reserve

- Location within Puerto Rico
- Location: San Juan, Puerto Rico
- Nearest city: Santurce and Hato Rey
- Coordinates: 18.433°N 66.061°W
- Area: 194 acres (79 ha)

Caño Martín Peña Nature Reserve (Spanish: Reserva Natural Caño Martín Peña) is a nature reserve in San Juan, Puerto Rico located along the 3.75 mile long Martín Peña Channel. The nature reserve protects wetlands and an urban mangrove forest which extends throughout the channel between the Los Corozos and San José Lagoons in the east and the San Juan Bay in the west, and between the districts of Santurce in the north and Hato Rey in the south. This reserve is managed by the Puerto Rico Department of Natural and Environmental Resources (DRNA) and belongs to the larger San Juan Bay National Estuary, the only tropical estuary in the National Estuary Program network.

== History ==
This nature reserve is bordered by a number of residential areas, such as the Martín Peña neighborhood which formed in 1940 during the Great Depression. This community is constantly threatened by floods from the channel, and from industrial pollution which also threatens the ecosystem of the mangrove forest. The community formed the Caño Martín Peña Community Land Trust in 2017 which aims to formally legalize the housing in the neighborhood, guarantee safe and sustainable housing, relocate the families that live in critical flooding areas, and to aid and develop the ecological sustainability of the area.

== Ecology ==
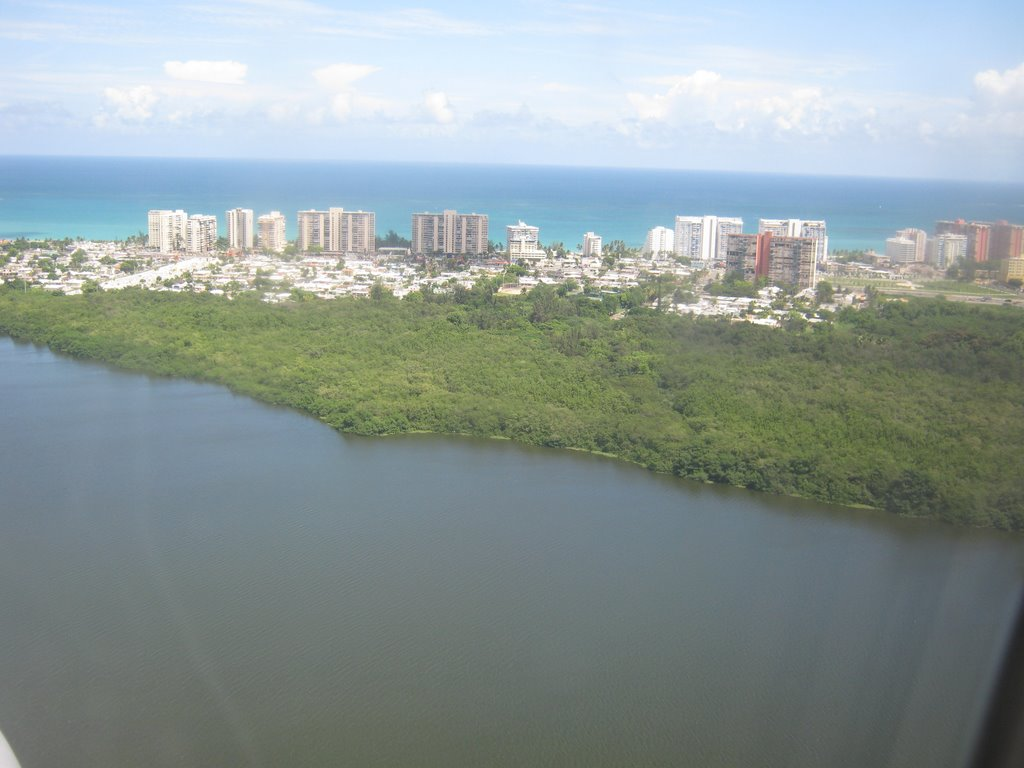
Caño Martín Peña

The Caño Martín Peña Nature Reserve is home to a mangrove forest which is home to a number of animal and plant species in the middle of the highly urbanized San Juan metropolitan area. All four species of mangrove that occurs in Puerto Rico can be found within the nature reserve: the red mangrove (Rhizophora mangle), black mangrove (Avicennia germinans), white mangrove (Laguncalaria racemosa) and button mangrove (Conocarpus erectus). The reserve is home to large populations of invasive species such as green iguanas, lionfish, caimans and alligators. The area is also important to a number of migratory bird species such as the merlin (Falco columbarius).

Some common native bird species include: little egrets (Egretta garzetta), little blue herons (Egretta caerulea), snowy egrets (Egretta thula), tricolored heron (Egretta tricolor), great egrets (Ardea alba), great white herons (Ardea herodias occidentalis), brown pelicans (Pelecanus occidentalis), yellow-crowned night herons (Nyctanassa violacea) and black-crowned night herons (Nycticorax nycticorax).

== Recreation ==
The nature reserve is open to visitors who are allowed access through the Enrique Martí Coll Linear Park (Parque Lineal Enrique Martí Coll) by entrances located in the San Juan Central Park (Parque Central de San Juan) in the western edge of the reserve, the Teófilo "Teo" Cruz Park at the midpoint in Santurce, and the AcuaExpreso ferry Hato Rey Terminal and Trocadero Diverplex next to the rapid-transit Tren Urbano station of Hato Rey by the Choliseo.

== See also ==
- Caño Martín Peña
- Martín Peña, Hato Rey
- Martín Peña, Santurce
- Protected areas of Puerto Rico
