= San José (Oriente) =

Coordinates: 18.4199582°N 66.0345960°W

- Subbarrio
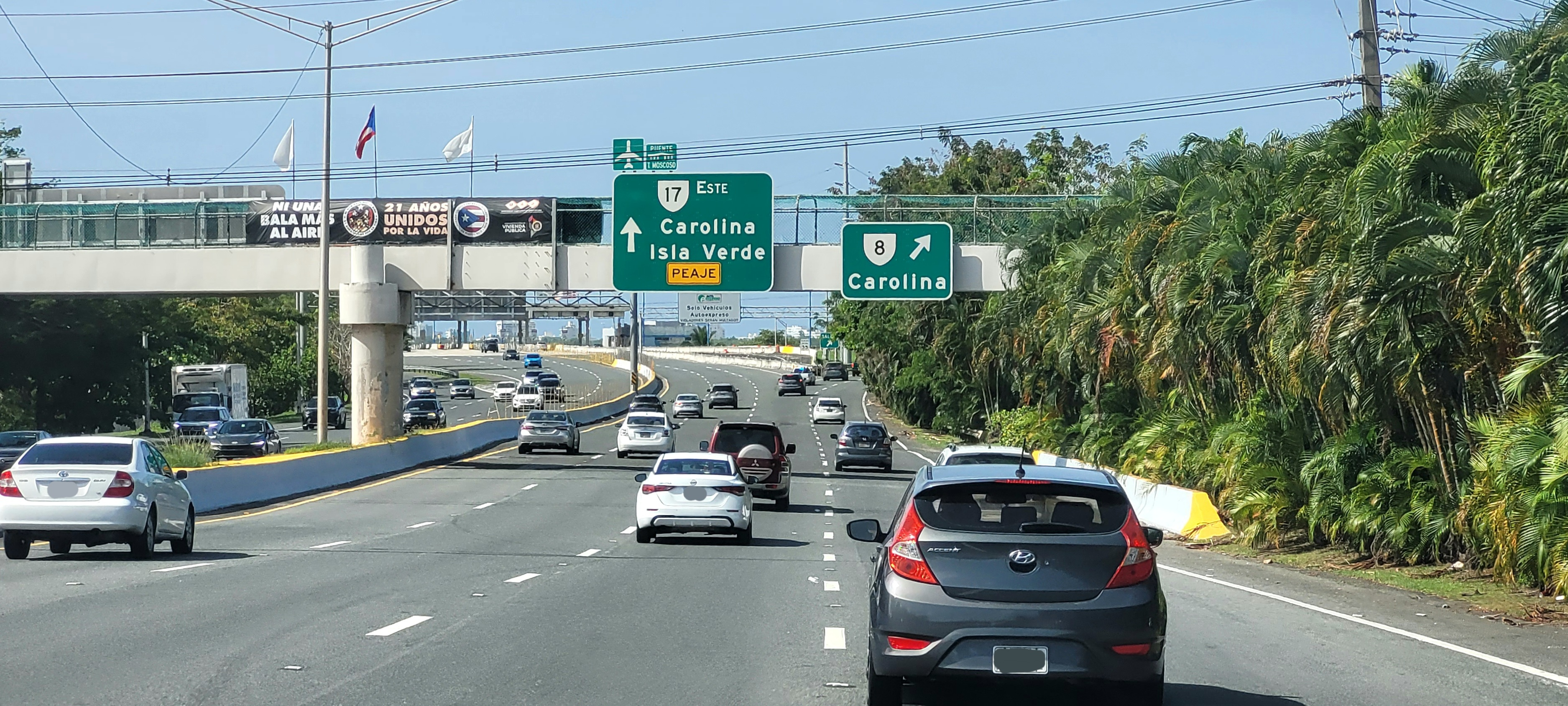
- Puerto Rico Highway 17 between López Sicardó and San José
- Interactive map of San José
- Commonwealth: Puerto Rico
- Municipality: San Juan
- Barrio: Oriente

Government
  - Type: Borough of San Juan
  - Borough President: Jorge Santini
  - Secretary of Education: Jesús Rivera Sánchez

Population
  - Total: 19,515
- Source: 2000 United States census

San José is one out of 3 sectors in Oriente.
