= Sabana Llana =

Sabana Llana may refer to:

- Sabana Llana Norte, San Juan, Puerto Rico, a barrio
- Sabana Llana Sur, San Juan, Puerto Rico, a barrio
- Sabana Llana, Juana Díaz, Puerto Rico, a barrio
