= Sabana Llana Norte, San Juan, Puerto Rico =

Barrio of Puerto Rico

Sabana Llana Norte
- Barrio
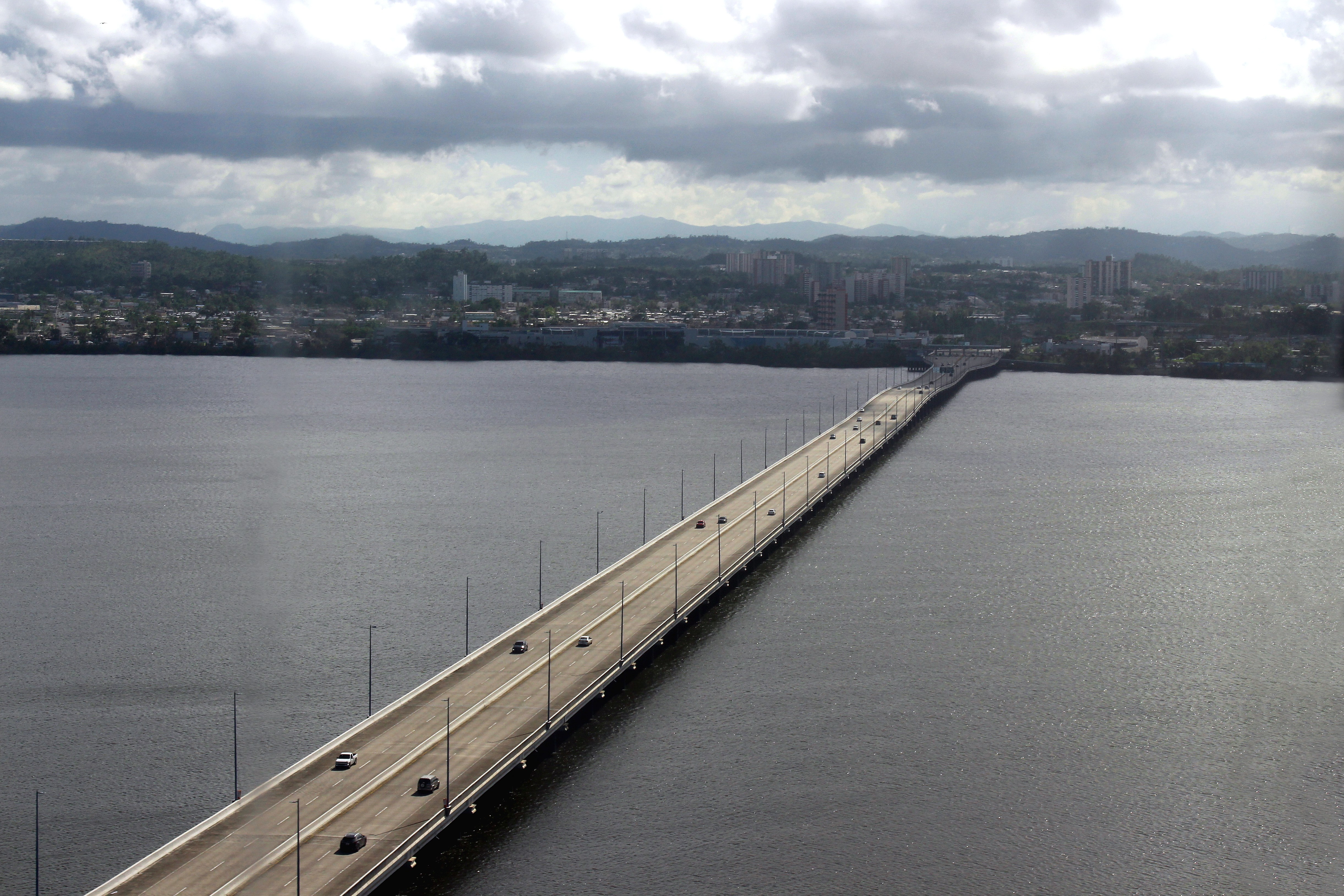
- View of the Teodoro Moscoso Bridge and The Mall of San Juan in Sabana Llana Norte.

- Location within Puerto Rico
- Coordinates: 18°24′20″N 66°00′44″W
- Commonwealth: Puerto Rico
- Municipality: San Juan

Area
  - Total: 2.69 sq mi (7.0 km^{2})
  - Land: 2.41 sq mi (6.2 km^{2})
  - Water: 0.28 sq mi (0.73 km^{2})
- Elevation: 33 ft (10 m)

Population (2010)
  - Total: 30,118
  - Density: 12,497.1/sq mi (4,825.2/km^{2})
- Time zone: UTC−4 (AST)

Sabana Llana Norte is one of the 18 barrios in the municipality of San Juan, Puerto Rico.

== Demographics ==
In 2010, Sabana Llana Norte had a population of 30,118.

Historical population
Census	Pop.	Note	%±
1950	3,634		—
1960	17,906		392.7%
1970	34,900		94.9%
1980	33,859		−3.0%
1990	31,580		−6.7%
2000	32,252		2.1%
2010	30,118		−6.6%
U.S. Decennial Census; 1900 (N/A) 1910-1930; 1930-1950 1980-2000 2010

== Location ==
Sabana Llana Norte is located east of Oriente barrio, north of the municipality of Trujillo Alto and west of the municipality of Carolina. It is bordered by the San José Lagoon on top, its closest body of water.

== Features ==
Sabana Llana has the following features:

- Population: ~32,000 - Land Area: 2.39 square miles (6.2 km^{2}) - Total Area: 2.52 square miles (6.5 km^{2})

== Gallery ==
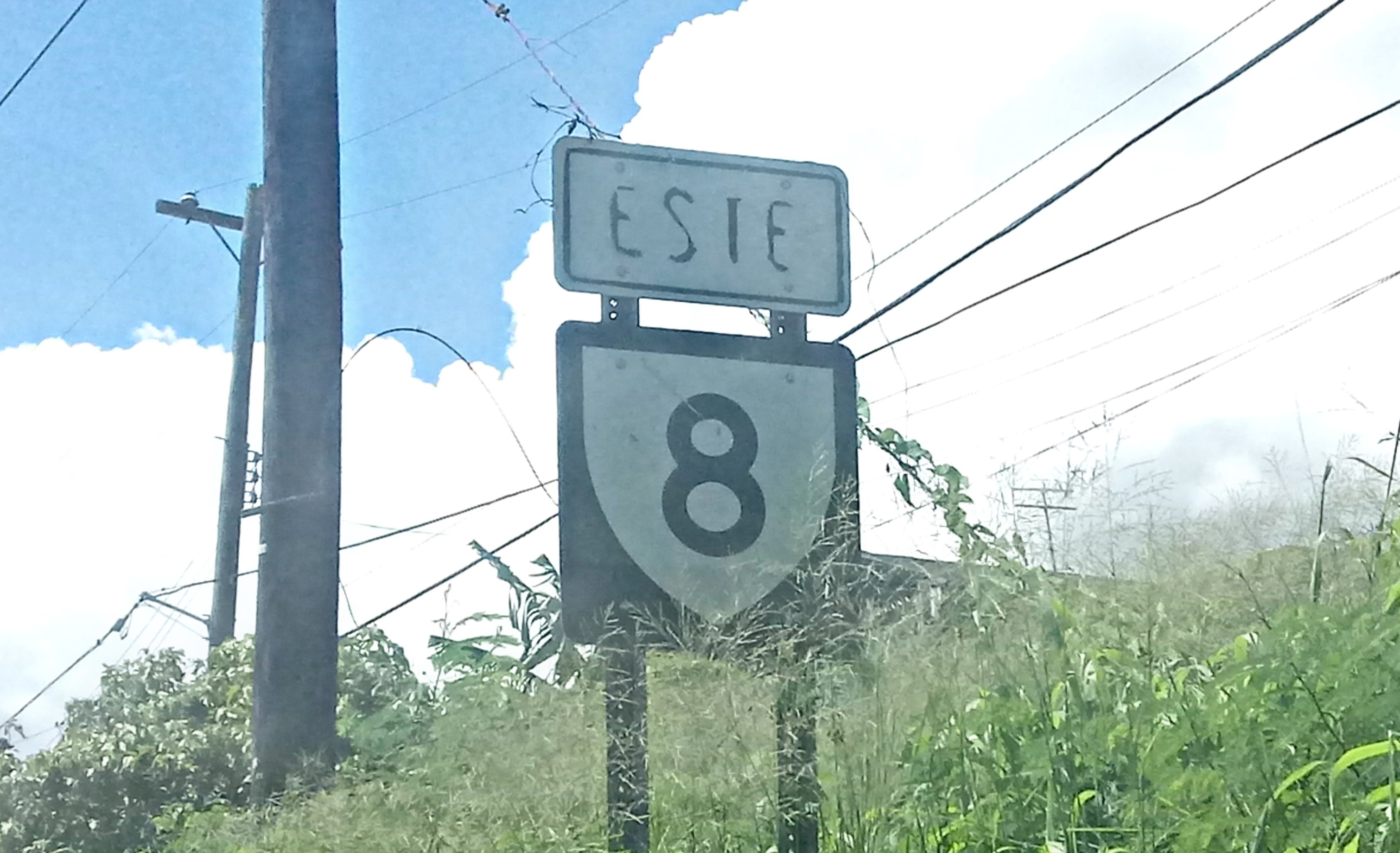
PR-8 in Sabana Llana near the Mall of San Juan

Interior of The Mall of San Juan, with a Porsche 911 Targa 4S on display

== See also ==
- List of communities in Puerto Rico
- Aguada Limestone
- Sabana Llana Sur, San Juan, Puerto Rico
