= Martín Peña Channel =

Body of water in San Juan, Puerto Rico

Coordinates: 18.433°N 66.061°W

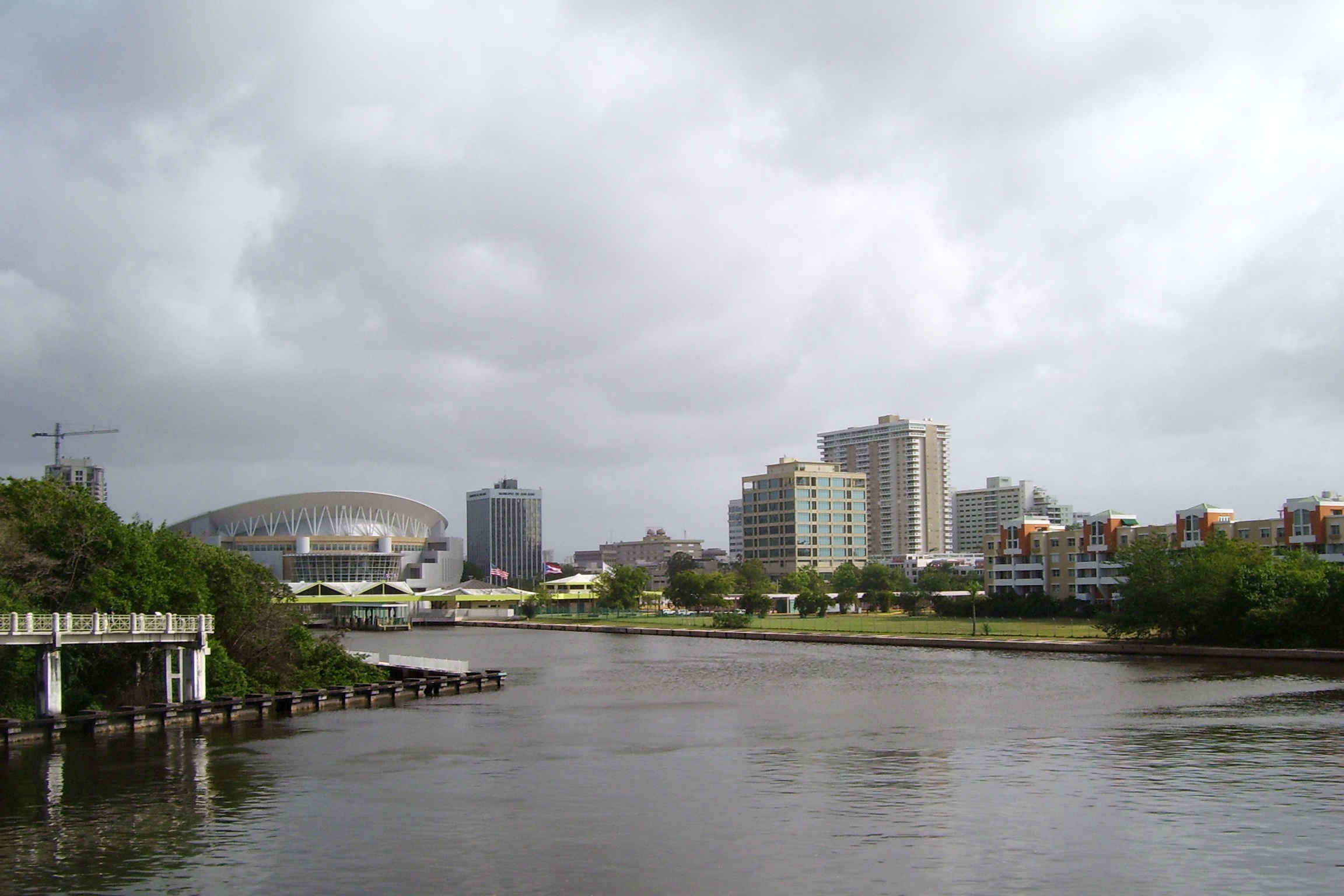
- Hato Rey Norte skyline, with Martín Peña Canal and José Miguel Agrelot Coliseum

- Location within Puerto Rico

Location
- Commonwealth: Puerto Rico
- Municipality: San Juan

Physical characteristics
- Source
- Length: 3.75 miles

The Martín Peña Channel (Spanish: Caño de Martín Peña) is a body of water in San Juan, Puerto Rico. The similarly named Martín Peña is a neighborhood, with informal housing, adjacent to the channel.

The channel runs from San Juan Bay in the west to Laguna San José and Laguna Los Corozos in the east. It separates the barrio of Santurce on the north side from Hato Rey Norte, Hato Rey Central, and Oriente on the south side.

== Improvement initiatives ==
The channel has had a history of being strewn with trash, which breed mosquitoes, and a health hazard for its nearby residents in the Martín Peña subbarrio. Due to the narrowing of the channel over time, the area is subject to frequent flooding, including raw sewage from buildings with insufficient sanitation.

The Caño Martín Peña ENLACE Project Corporation (Spanish: Corporación ENLACE del Caño Martin Peña, English acronym ENLACE) is a corporation owned by the Puerto Rico government, created to improve the local sewage system. As of 2016, ENLACE has spent $120 million from the territorial government on sewage improvements. Implementation of a $600 million ecosystem restoration plan that will dredge the canal depends on resolution of the Puerto Rican government-debt crisis and federal funding for assistance from the United States Environmental Protection Agency and the United States Army Corps of Engineers.

In 2015 the area won an UN award to fix the area. In 2017 the community continued demanding the betterment of their community with a campaign stating, "don't look at me, look at the channel" (Spanish: no me mires a mi, mira al canal). According to the community's campaign website there remained 26,000 people affected by the polluted channel.

After Hurricane Maria on September 20, 2017, the canal caused flooding in eight barrios nearby for weeks and was the most impacted community of San Juan.

In August 2019, a resolution was passed to improve the infrastructure of Martín Peña.

== Gallery ==
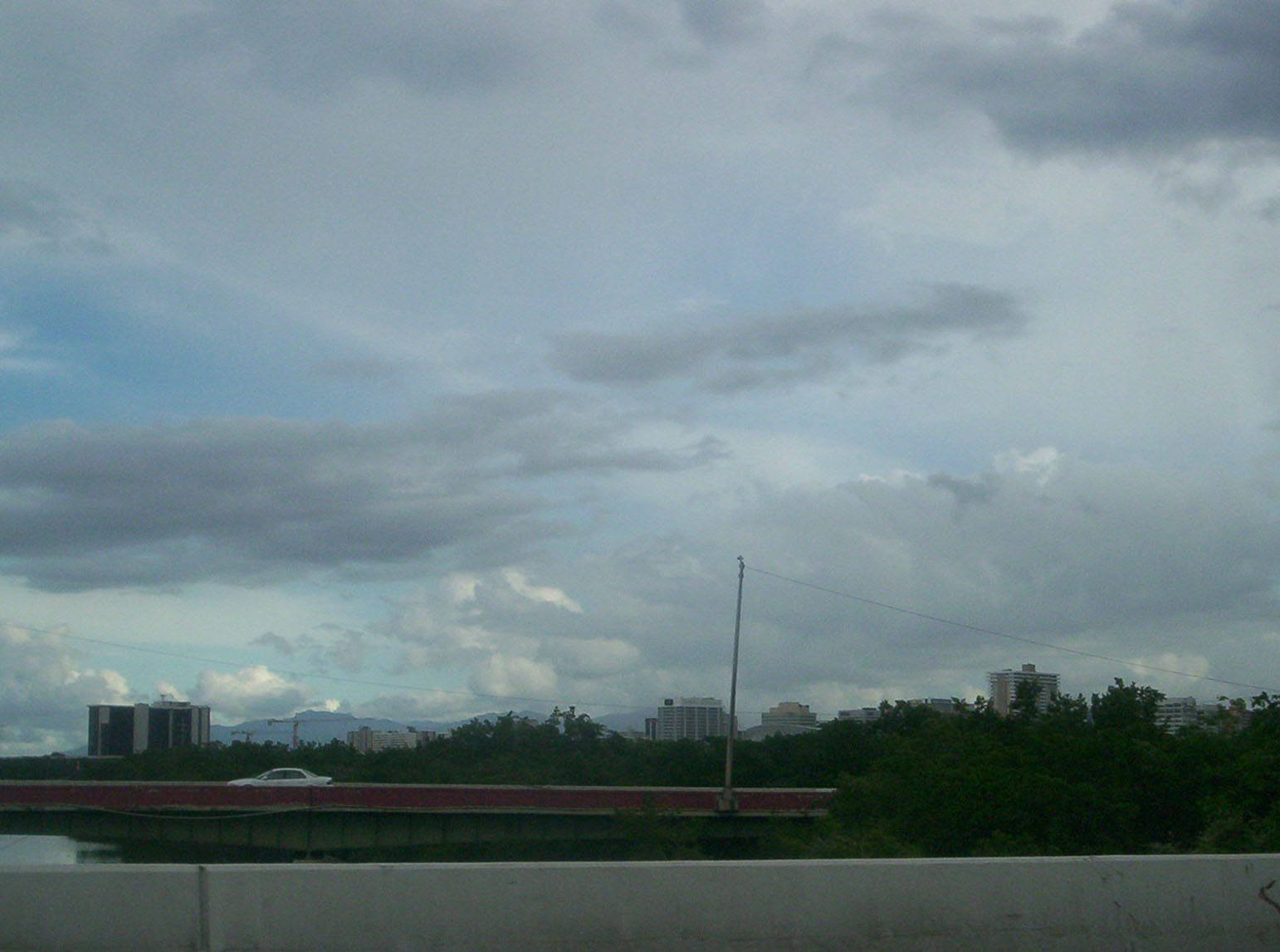
Bridge on PR-22 over Martín Peña with Milla de Oro and El Yunque in the background

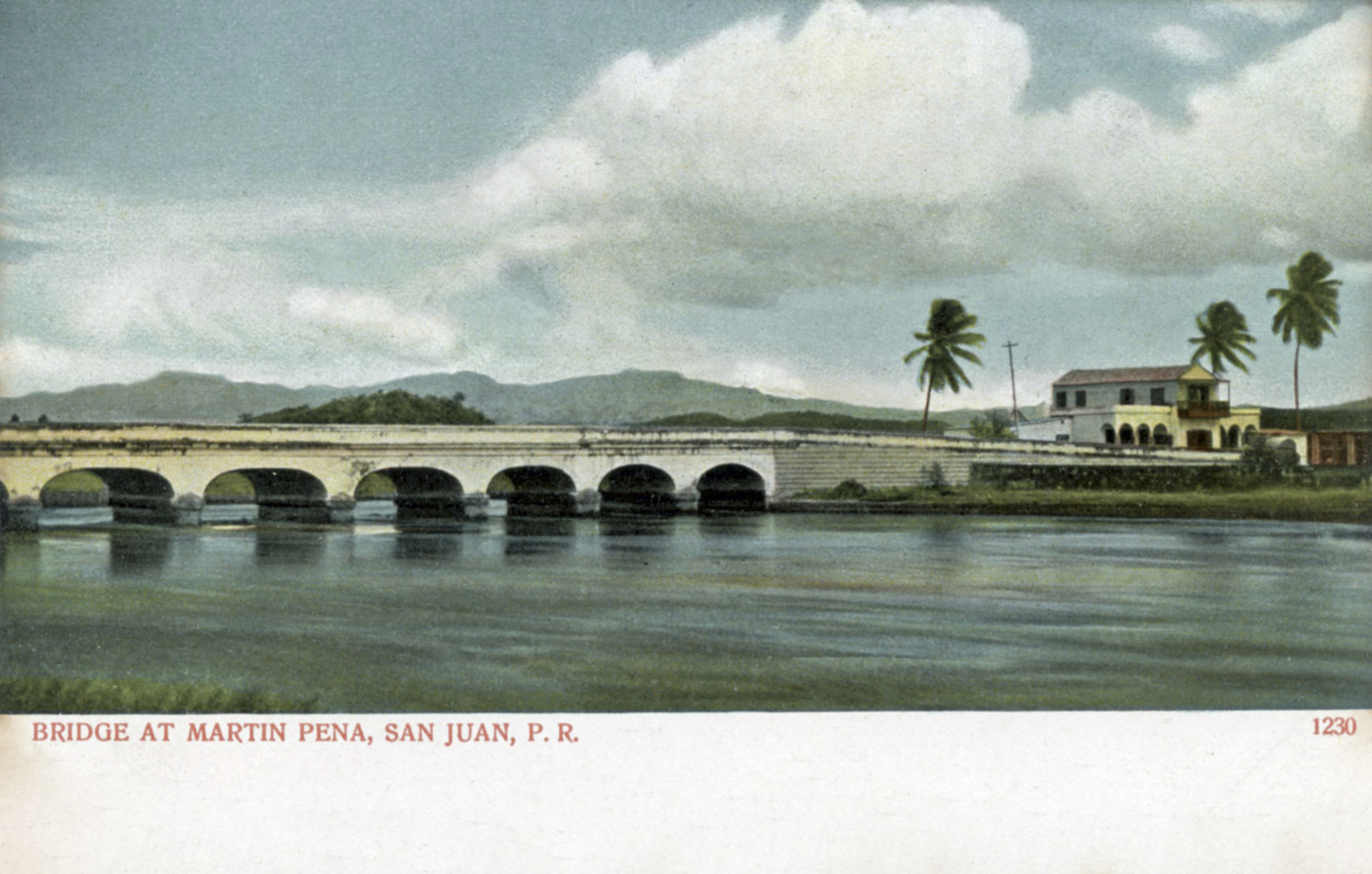
The Martín Peña Channel on a 1905 postcard

== See also ==
- Caño Martín Peña Nature Reserve
- Martín Peña Bridge: NRHP listing
- List of rivers of Puerto Rico
