= López Sicardó (Oriente) =

Coordinates: 18.4041151°N 66.0339610°W

- Subbarrio
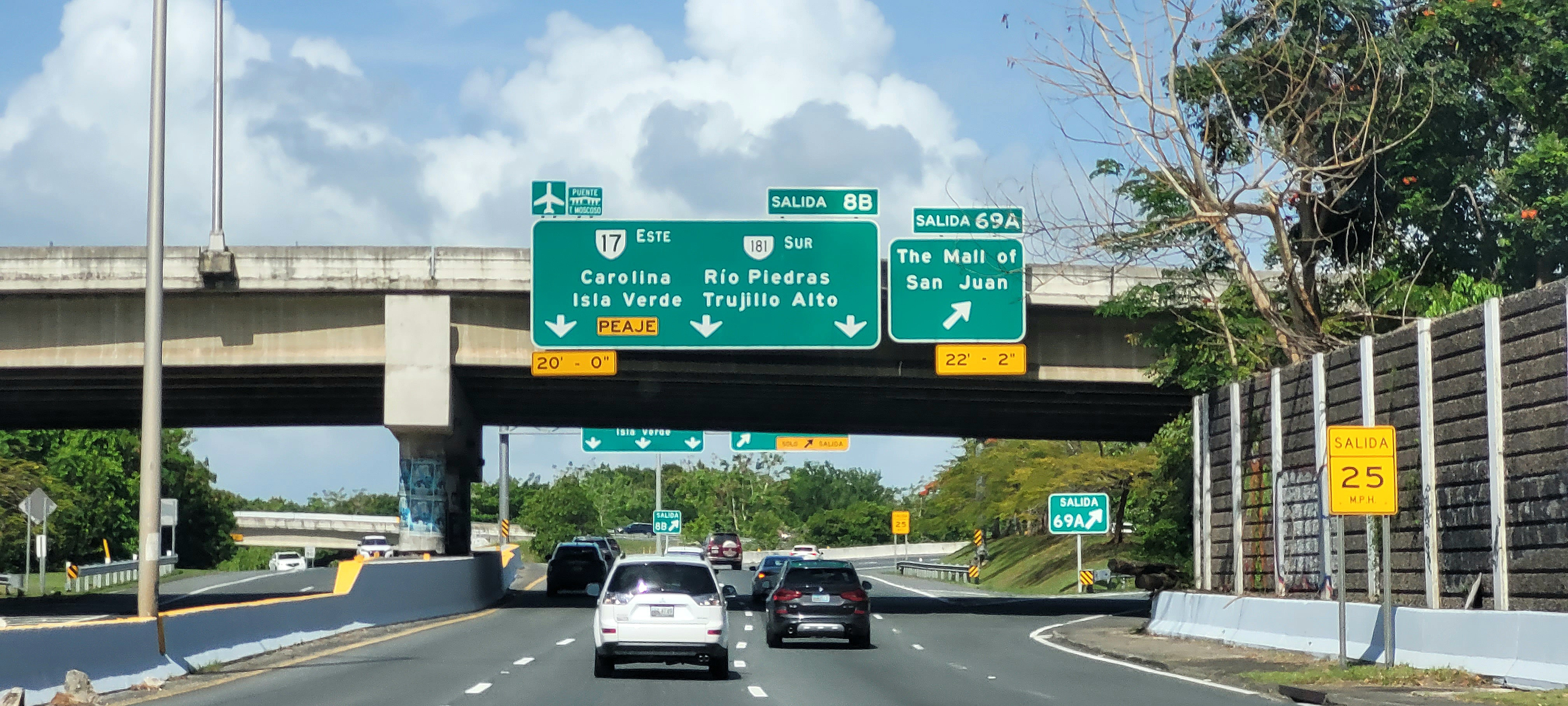
- Puerto Rico Highway 17 in López Sicardó
- Interactive map of López Sicardó
- Commonwealth: Puerto Rico
- Municipality: San Juan
- Barrio: Oriente

Government
  - Type: Borough of San Juan
  - Mayor: Miguel Romero
  - Secretary of Education: Jesús Rivera Sánchez

Population
  - Total: 13,815
- Source: 2000 United States census

López Sicardó is one of the three sectors in the Oriente barrio of Puerto Rico. López Sicardó is a subbarrio classified as a civil geographic unit within the San Juan Municipio of Puerto Rico. According to the U.S. Census Bureau's Geography Division, it is officially recognized with the Feature ID 2415600. The subbarrio is located at coordinates approximately 18°24'14.81" N latitude and 66°2'2.26" W longitude, with an elevation of about 26 meters (85 feet) above sea level. This geographic designation comes from the Census County/Townships, Census Designated Places (CDPs), and incorporated cities data compiled by the Bureau of the Census as of January 1, 2002. López Sicardó forms part of the urban fabric of San Juan and is included within the northeastern San Juan Municipio, contributing to the area's demographic and geographic profile.
