= The Mall of San Juan =

Shopping mall near the San José Lagoon in San Juan, Puerto Rico

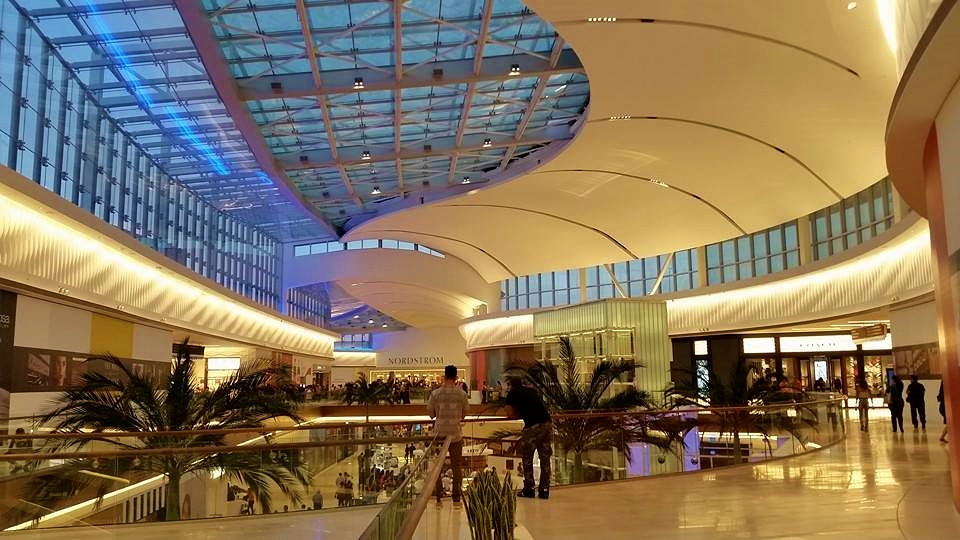
- View of the Grand Court towards former Nordstrom
- Location: San Juan, Puerto Rico
- Coordinates: 18.4121°N 66.0254°W
- Address: 1000 The Mall of San Juan Blvd
- Opened: March 26, 2015; 11 years ago
- Developer: Taubman Centers
- Manager: Simon Property Group
- Owner: Simon Property Group
- Num. of stores: 100
- Num. of anchor tenants: 2
- Floor area: 650,000 sq ft
- Floors: 3
- Parking: 3,000 spaces
- Website: www.simon.com/mall/the-mall-of-san-juan

The Mall of San Juan is a 650,000 sq ft (60,000 m^{2}) upscale shopping mall located across from the San José Lagoon, at the south end of the Teodoro Moscoso Bridge, near Luis Muñoz Marín International Airport, San Juan, Puerto Rico. When the mall opened on March 26, 2015, it was anchored by Nordstrom and Saks Fifth Avenue, both being the chain's first stores to open in Puerto Rico, and the entire Caribbean. The mall was constructed at a cost of $475 million by Taubman Centers. The mall currently opens at 10:00 AM everyday, and closes at 8:00 PM from Monday through Thursday. On Fridays, the mall is open until 9:00 PM, and it closes at 7:00 PM on Saturdays and Sundays. The mall is owned and managed by Simon Property Group, which acquired former original developer Taubman Centers in November 2025.

== History ==
Interior of The Mall of San Juan, with the Porsche 911 Targa 4S on display

The land where the mall stands today was once a large building complex, originally hosting the 1979 Pan American Games. The buildings were demolished in 1998, in what was then a world-record for the most buildings to be demolished, simultaneously, with explosives.

Originally, the mall project was called Nueva Puerta de San Juan when it was first conceived in the 1990s. In the 2000s, it was renamed to Plaza Internacional. Construction of the mall had been delayed for several years due to financing issues and a lawsuit by the owners of the adjacent Plaza Las Americas. Later, New Century Development would file a counter lawsuit, when Plaza Las Americas announced their plans for an expansion. The project was later given its current name, and finally broke ground in 2012. Original plans had included the construction of an office tower, a hotel and a casino, with work originally set to begin later in 2015, after the mall opened, and completed by 2017; however, this never came to fruition.

Hurricane Maria made landfall on Puerto Rico on September 20, 2017, severely damaging anchor stores Nordstrom and Saks Fifth Avenue; on October 30, 2019, it was announced that Saks would not be reopening. Nordstrom reopened on November 9, 2018.

In March 2020, the mall closed indefinitely due to the COVID-19 pandemic in Puerto Rico. On May 7, 2020, Nordstrom announced that it would not be reopening post-lockdown. The mall itself reopened just three months later, in June 2020, with limited initial capacity (as recommended by the Centers for Disease Control and Prevention) and requiring face masks for anyone entering the premises. The second floor of the former Nordstrom is now a children's entertainment center called Brincoteo.

On December 8, 2021, local TV station WLII-DT announced that they would be occupying one of the empty anchors for their new studio facilities, beginning in 2022. The facility was unveiled to the public during the station's upfront presentation, where it was announced that the network's new show, La Boveda de Mr. Cash, would begin broadcasting from the facility later in 2022. La Boveda de Mr. Cash premiered on March 1, 2022, live from the mall. The new TeleOnce facility occupies the space of the former Saks Fifth Avenue, and has since been divided into seven different potential studio spaces, on its lower level, along with a large lobby area with adequate space to queue audience members. La Bóveda de Mr. Cash occupies the last available space on the first floor, with work on the second floor expected to begin.

On December 16, 2025, it was announced that the mall had been acquired by Simon Property Group, following its acquisition of Taubman Centers' other properties in November of that same year.

== See also ==
- Plaza Las Americas
- Plaza Carolina
- Plaza del Sol (Puerto Rico)
- Las Catalinas Mall
