= Aguada Limestone =

Geologic formation in Puerto Rico

- Stratigraphic range: Neogene
- Type: Formation

Location
- Region: Caribbean
- Country: Puerto Rico

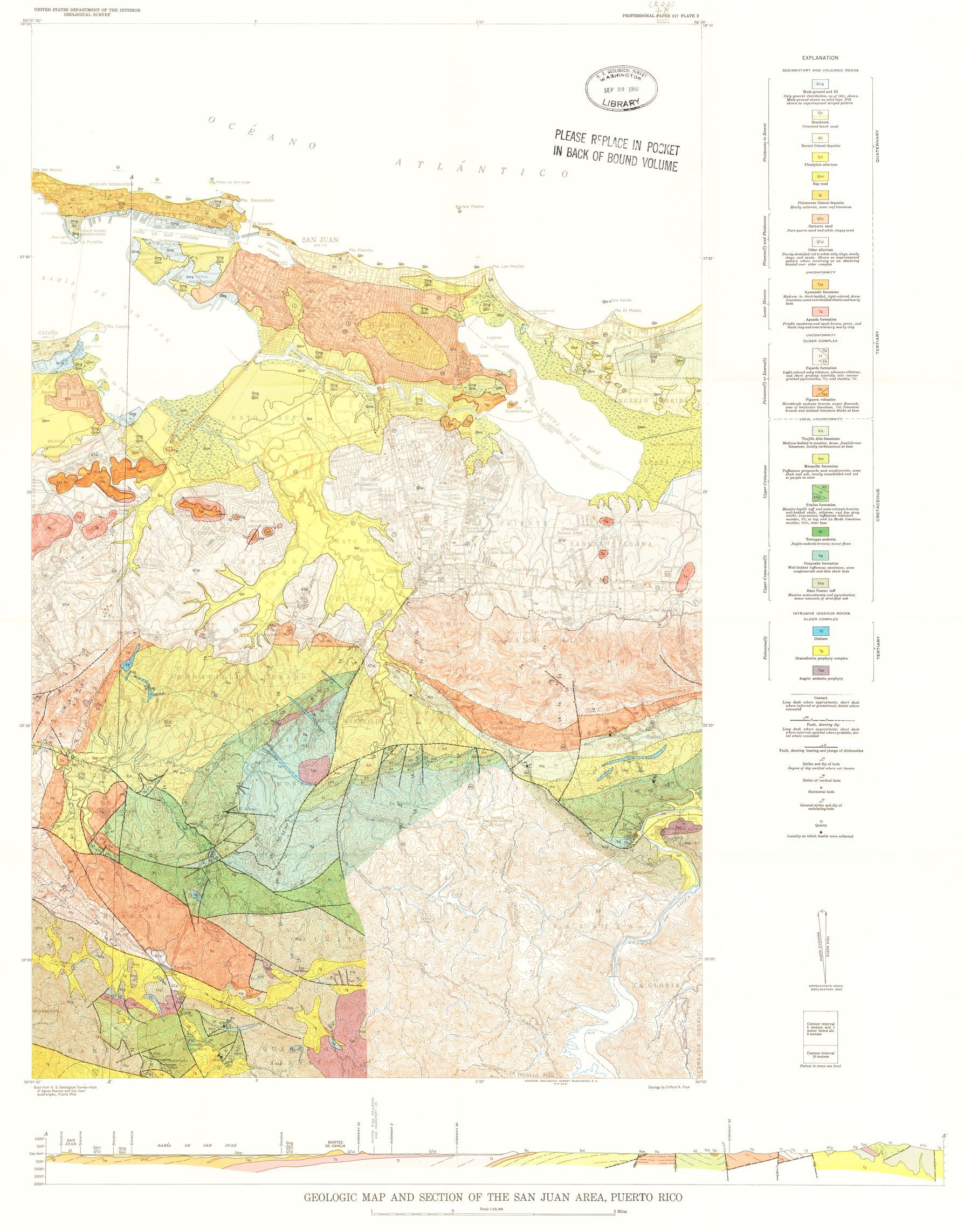
The Aguada formation marked as Ta can be seen in Sabana Llana

The Aguada Limestone also known as the Aguada formation is a geologic formation in San Juan, Puerto Rico. It preserves fossils dating back to the Neogene period.

== See also ==
- List of fossiliferous stratigraphic units in Puerto Rico
