= Sabana Llana Sur, San Juan, Puerto Rico =

Barrio of Puerto Rico

Sabana Llana Sur
- Barrio
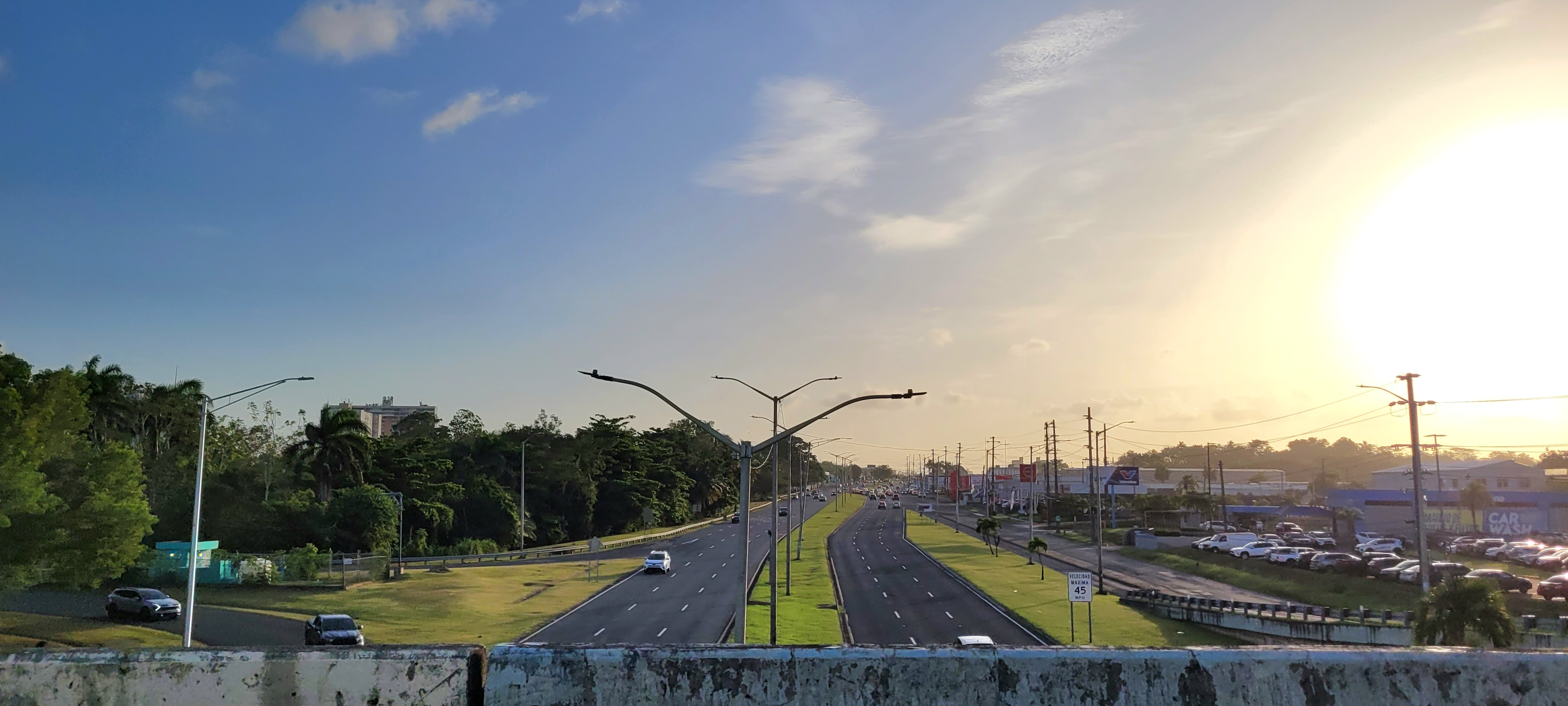
- Puerto Rico Highway 3 between Sabana Llana Sur and Sabana Llana Norte

- Location within Puerto Rico
- Coordinates: 18°23′03″N 66°01′18″W
- Commonwealth: Puerto Rico
- Municipality: San Juan

Area
  - Total: 4.2 sq mi (11 km^{2})
  - Land: 4.2 sq mi (11 km^{2})
  - Water: 0.00 sq mi (0 km^{2})
- Elevation: 226 ft (69 m)

Population (2020)
  - Total: 38,986
- Time zone: UTC−4 (AST)

Sabana Llana Sur is one of the 18 barrios in the municipality of San Juan, Puerto Rico.

== History and demographics ==
In 2020, Sabana Llana Sur had a total population of 38,986.

Historical population
Census	Pop.	Note	%±
1950	4,801		—
1960	10,424		117.1%
1970	28,349		172.0%
1980	38,098		34.4%
1990	43,716		14.7%
2000	43,839		0.3%
2010	41,346		−5.7%
2020	38,986		−5.7%
U.S. Decennial Census; 1900 (N/A) 1910-1930; 1930-1950 1980-2000 2010 2020

In 2024, the International Chamber Orchestra of Puerto Rico performed a symphony in Sabana Llana.

== Location ==
Sabana Llana Sur is located east of El Cinco barrio, north of the municipality of Trujillo Alto and west of the municipality of Carolina. It is bordered by the Sabana Llana Norte and Oriente barrios to the north.

== Territories ==
Sabana Llana Sur has the following features.

- Population: 38986 - Land: Area: 4.2 square miles (11 km^{2}) - Total Area: 4.2 square miles (11 km^{2})

== See also ==
- List of communities in Puerto Rico
- Aguada Limestone
