= Martín Peña (Santurce) =

Subbarrio of Santurce in San Juan, Puerto Rico

Coordinates: 18°26′15″N 66°03′40″W

- Subbarrio
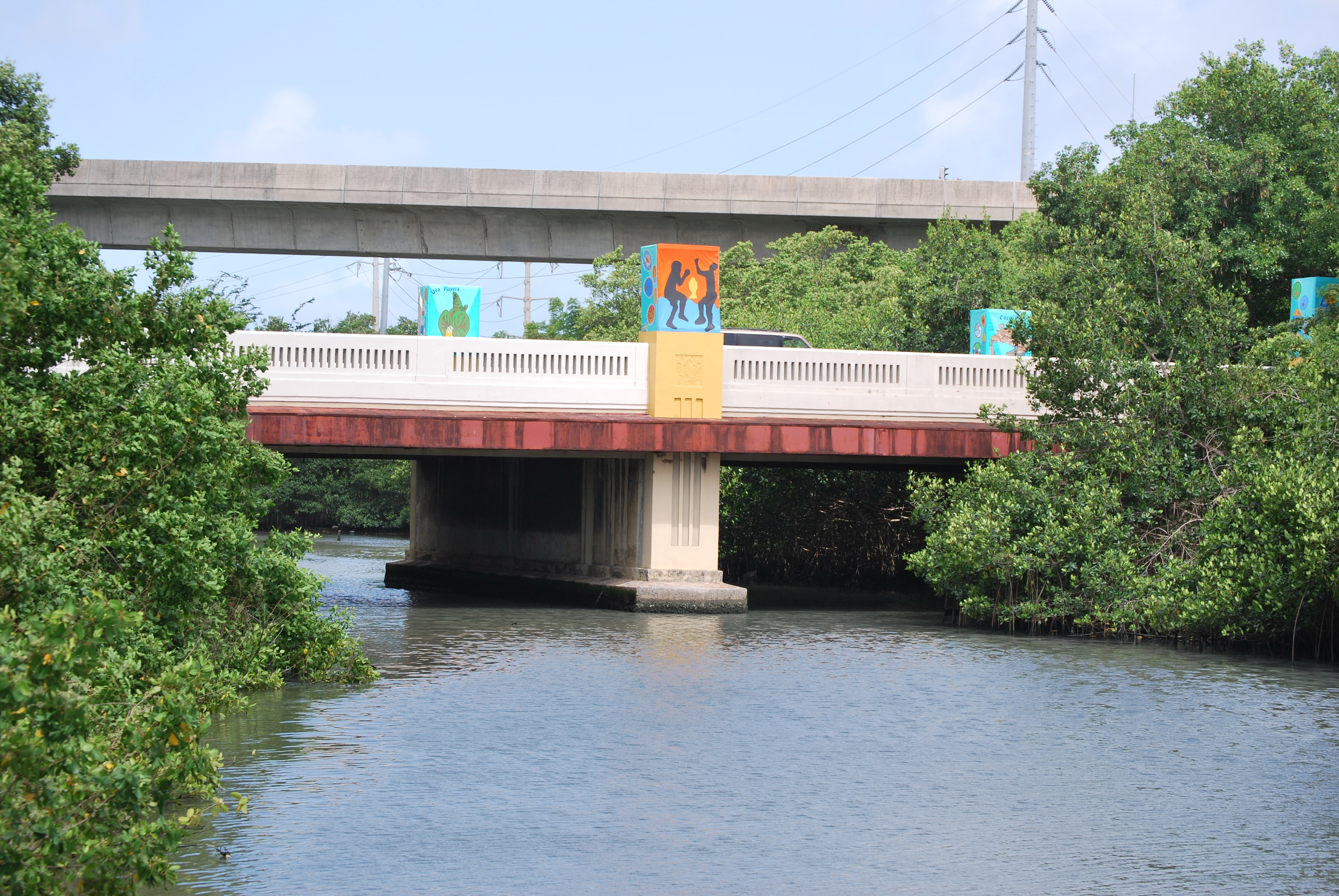
- Martin Peña Bridge in San Juan

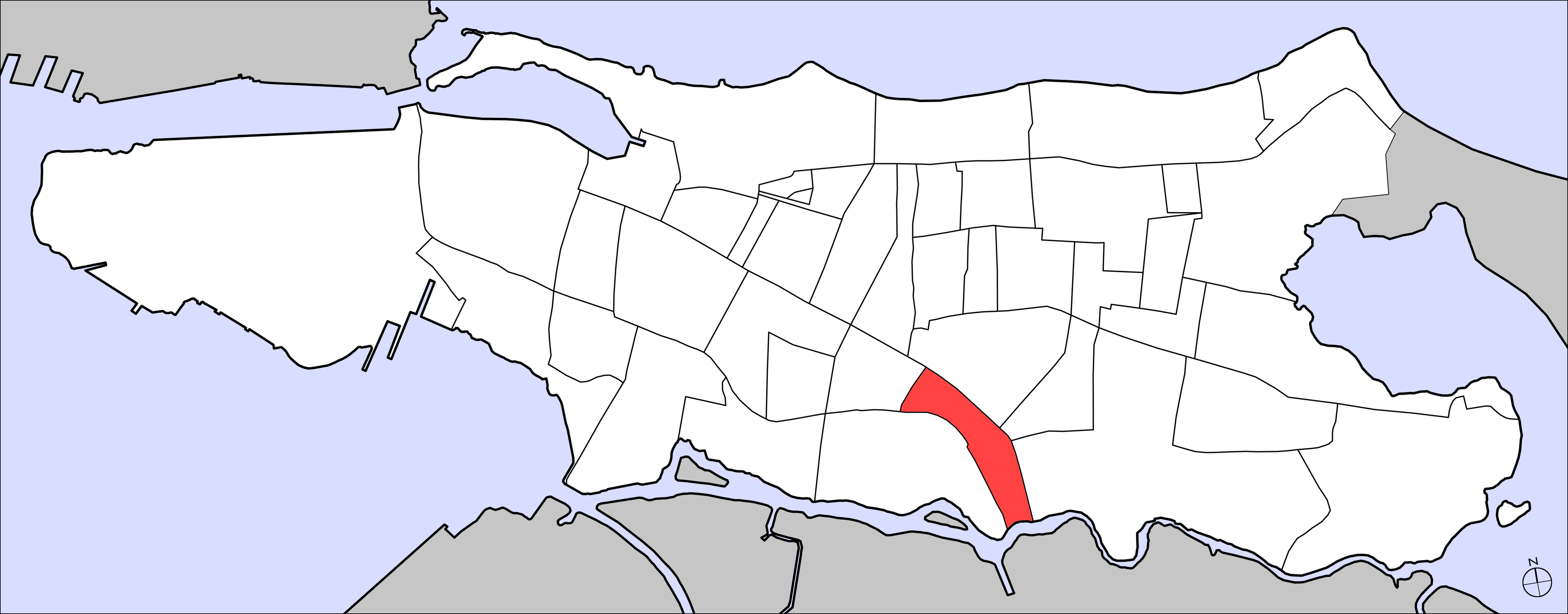
- Commonwealth: Puerto Rico
- Municipality: San Juan
- Barrio: Santurce

Area
  - Total: .08 sq mi (0.21 km^{2})
  - Land: .07 sq mi (0.18 km^{2})
  - Water: .01 sq mi (0.026 km^{2})
- Elevation: 0 ft (0 m)

Population (2010)
  - Total: 204
  - Density: 2,914.3/sq mi (1,125.2/km^{2})
- Source: 2010 Census
- Time zone: UTC−4 (AST)

Martín Peña is one of the 40 subbarrios of Santurce barrio, in the municipality of San Juan, Puerto Rico.

== Demographics ==
In 1940, Martín Peña had a population of 968.

In 2000, Martín Peña had a population of 415.

In 2010, Martín Peña had a population of 204 and a population density of 2,914.3 persons per square mile.

== Places ==
The Sagrado Corazón terminal station of the Tren Urbano of San Juan Is located in the corner of Fernández Juncos Avenue and Haydee Rexach street in Martín Peña.

== Gallery ==
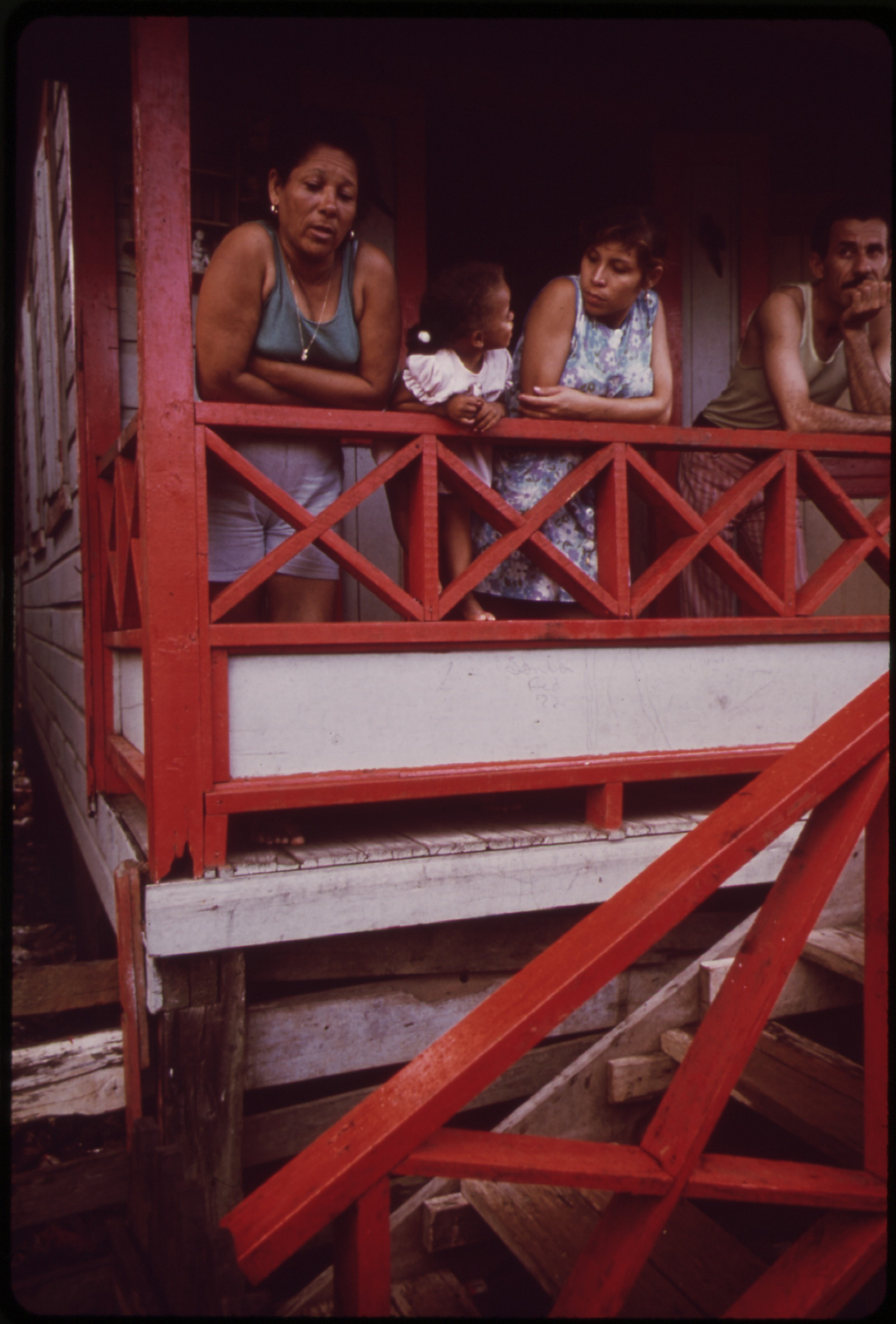
Martín Peña in 1972

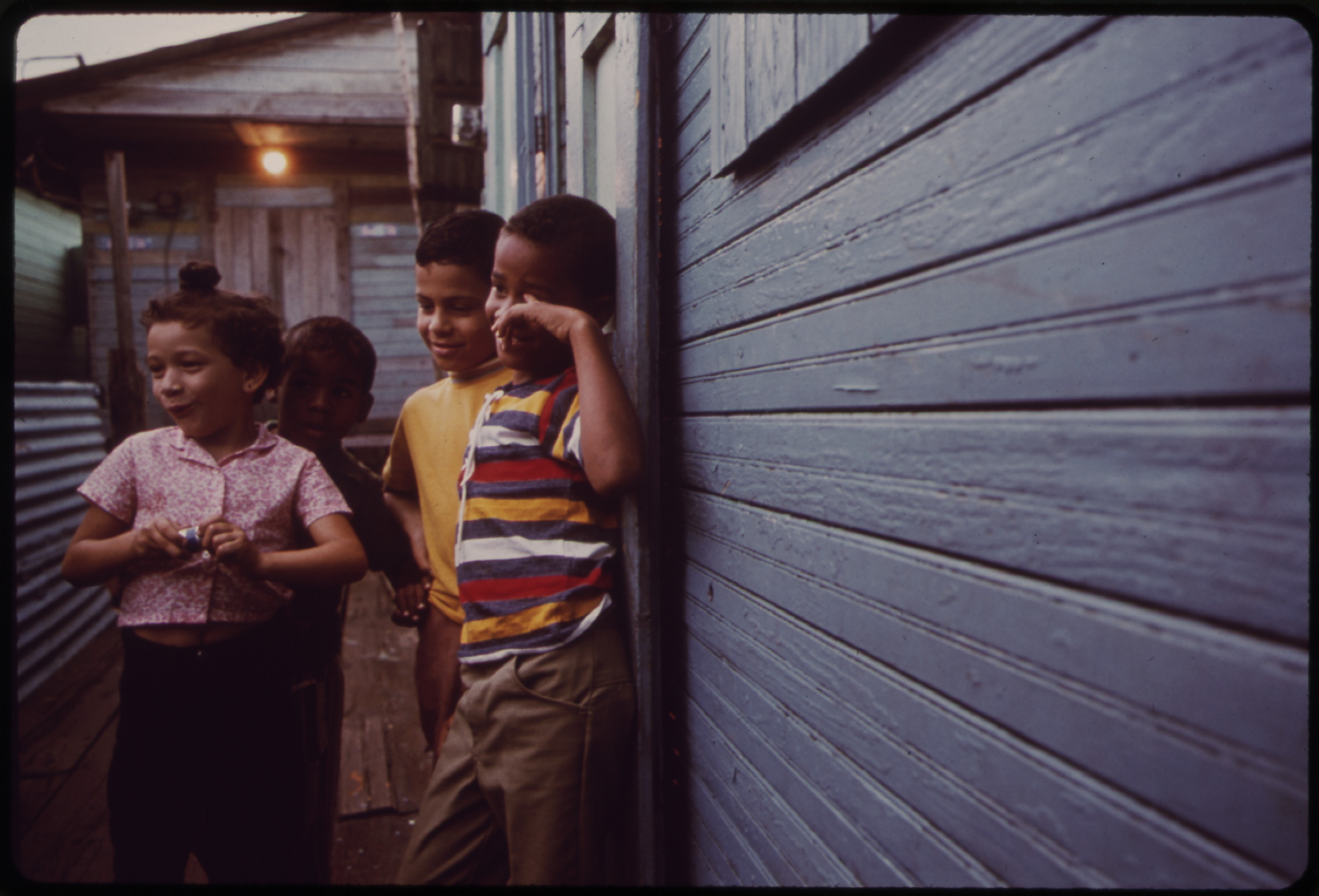
Martín Peña in 1972

== See also ==
- List of communities in Puerto Rico
