= Martín Peña (Hato Rey) =

Subbarrio in Puerto Rico

- Subbarrio
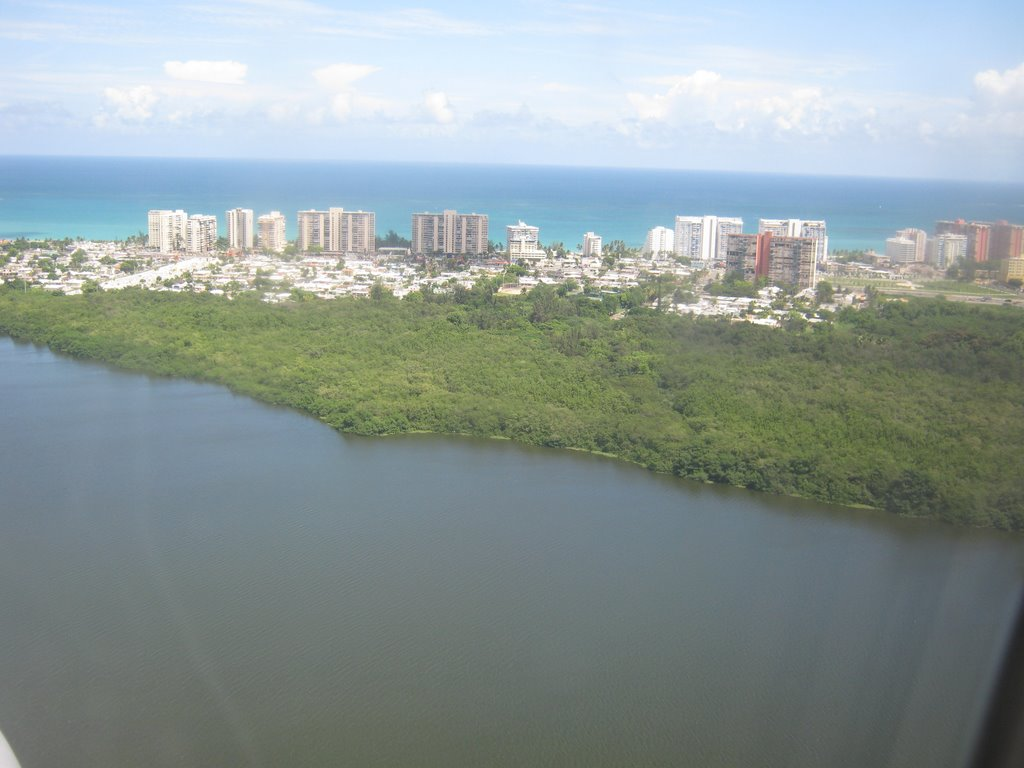
- View of the Martín Peña Channel

- Location within Puerto Rico
- Coordinates: 18°26′16″N 66°03′40″W
- Commonwealth: Puerto Rico
- Municipality: San Juan
- Barrio: Hato Rey Norte

Population (2000)
  - Total: 4,677
- Source: 2010 Census
- Time zone: UTC−4 (AST)

Martín Peña is one of the 4 subbarrios of barrio Hato Rey Norte, in the municipality of San Juan, Puerto Rico. The subbarrio has more than 2000 informal houses which get flooded with waters of the Martín Peña Channel.

For 30 years the community of Martin Peña dealt with the dirty waters of the Martin Peña Channel and in 2016 the area was still not safe from raw sewage.

In 2017 the community celebrated some victories such as their Community Land Trust but continued demanding the betterment of their community stating 26,000 people were still affected.
