= Oriente, San Juan, Puerto Rico =

Barrio of Puerto Rico

Oriente
- Barrio
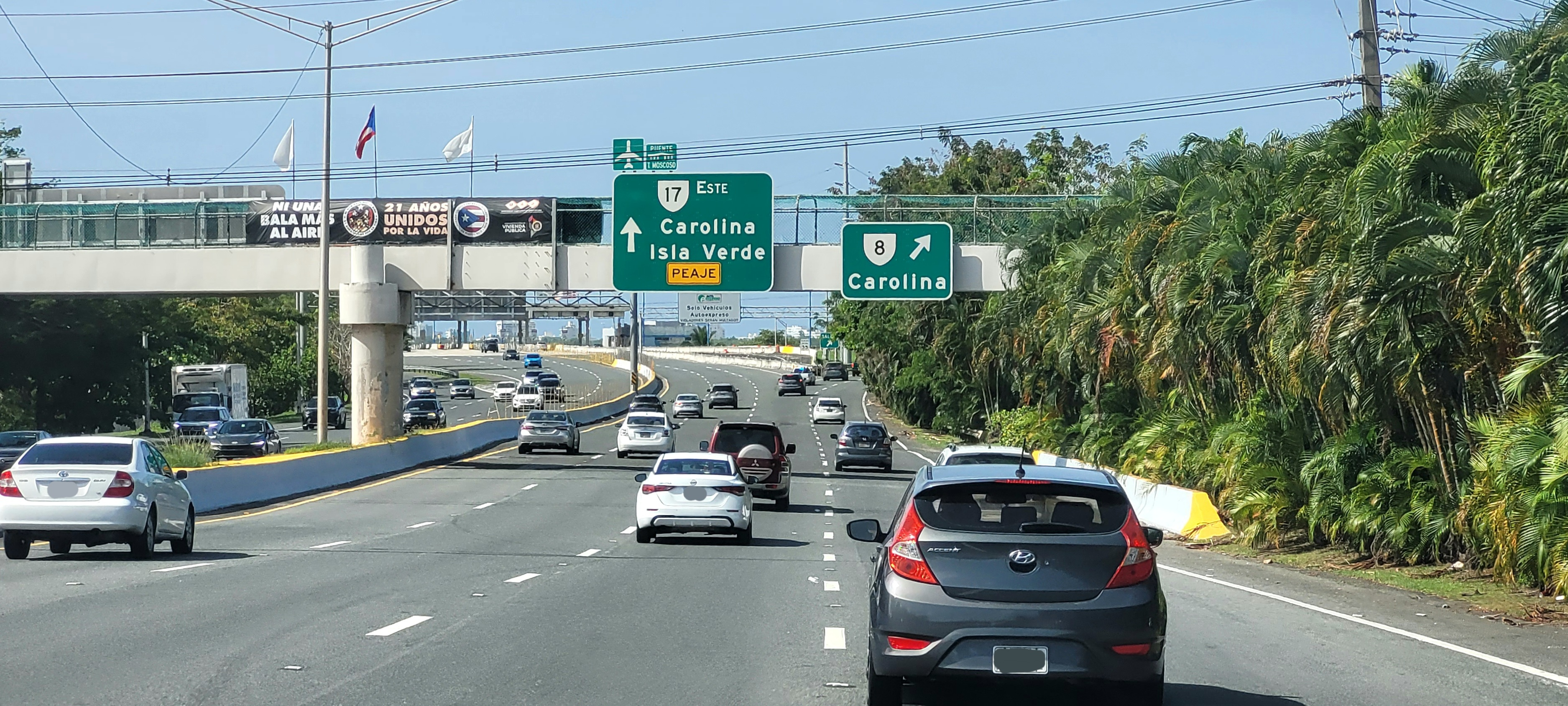
- Puerto Rico Highway 17 in Oriente

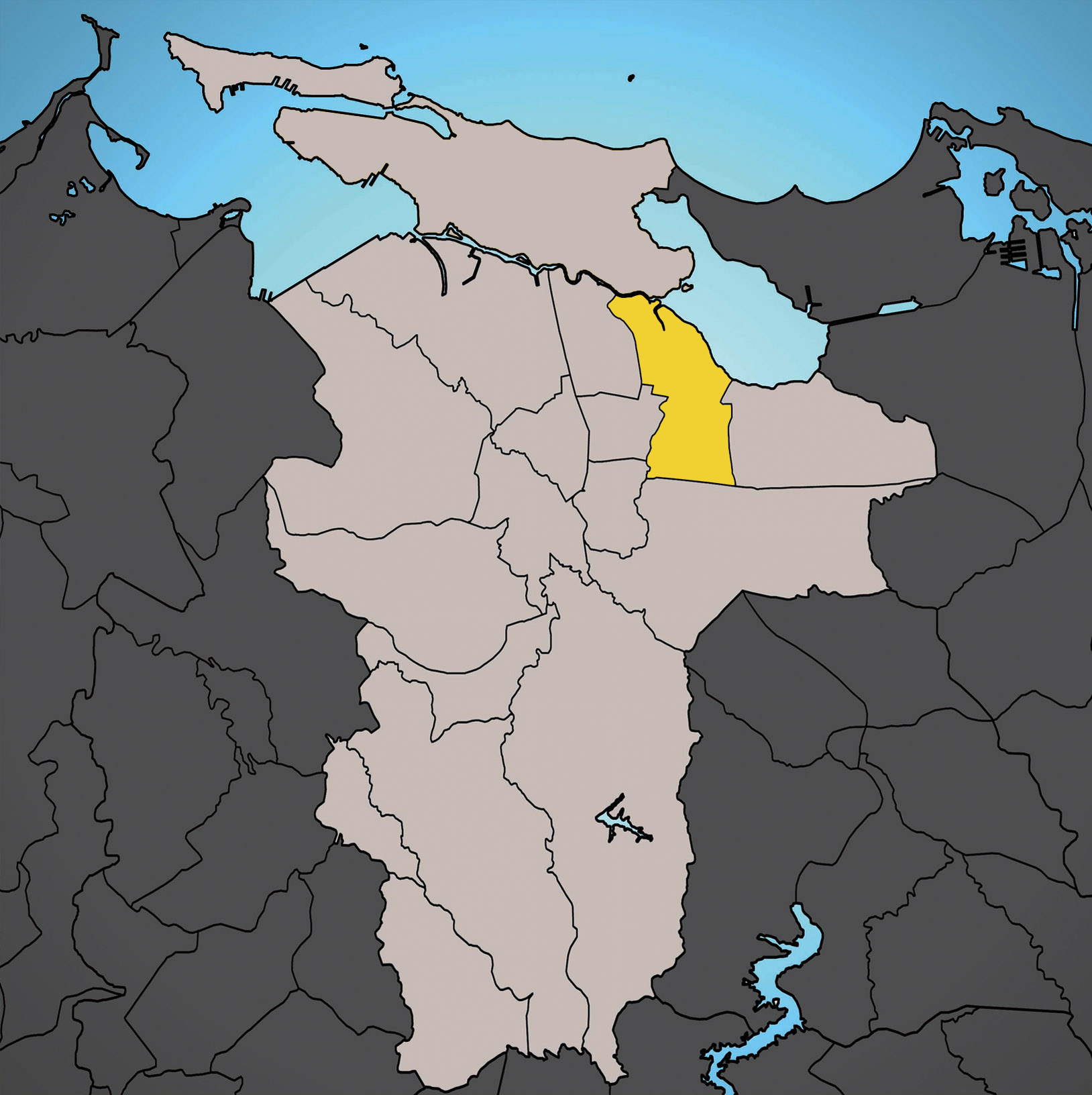
- Location of Oriente shown in yellow
- Coordinates: 18°24′51″N 66°02′05″W
- Commonwealth: Puerto Rico
- Municipality: San Juan

Area
  - Total: 2.23 sq mi (5.8 km^{2})
  - Land: 1.78 sq mi (4.6 km^{2})
  - Water: 0.45 sq mi (1.2 km^{2})
- Elevation: 10 ft (3.0 m)

Population (2010)
  - Total: 31,374
  - Density: 17,625.8/sq mi (6,805.4/km^{2})
- 2010 census
- Time zone: UTC−4 (AST)

Oriente is one of the 18 barrios of the municipality of San Juan, Puerto Rico. It is composed of 3 subbarrios: Borinquen, López Sicardó, and San José. Before 1951, it was a barrio of the former municipality of Rio Piedras. In 2010, it had a population of 31,374. It is surrounded by the barrios of Sabana Llana Norte to the east, Sabana Llana Sur to the south, Hato Rey Central and Hato Rey Norte to the west, and Santurce barrio and the San Jose Lagoon to the north.

== Demographics ==
Historical population
| Census | Pop. | Note | %± |
|---|---|---|---|
| 1950 | 14,595 | | — |
| 1960 | 34,985 | | 139.7% |
| 1970 | 43,194 | | 23.5% |
| 1980 | 39,857 | | −7.7% |
| 1990 | 37,621 | | −5.6% |
| 2000 | 34,799 | | −7.5% |
| 2010 | 31,374 | | −9.8% |
U.S. Decennial Census; 1900 (N/A) 1910-1930; 1930-1950 1980-2000 2010

== See also ==
- List of communities in Puerto Rico
