= Teodoro Moscoso Bridge =

Bridge in Puerto Rico

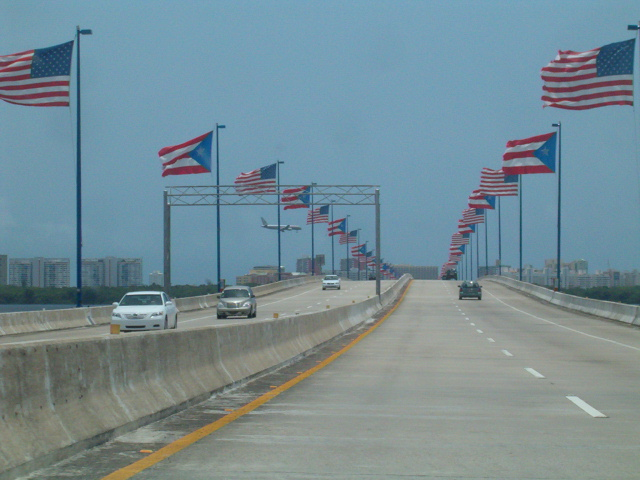
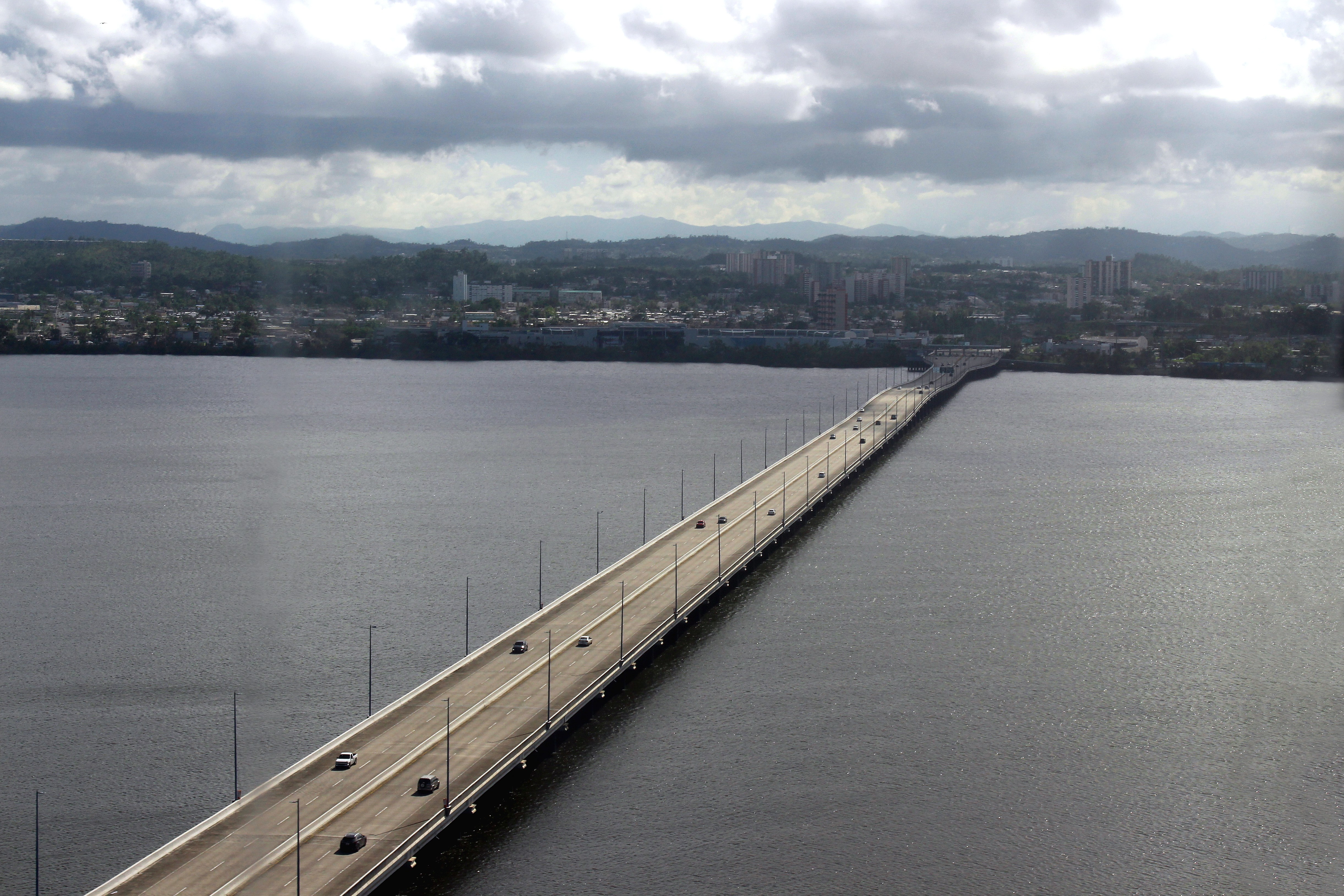
- East view of Teodoro Moscoso Bridge towards Isla Verde district in Carolina, 2006 West view of Bridge towards Hato Rey and Río Piedras districts in San Juan, 2017
- Coordinates: 18°25′28″N 66°01′29″W
- Carries: 4 lanes of PR-17 (Jesus T. Piñero Expressway)
- Crosses: San José Lagoon
- Locale: San Juan, P.R. and Carolina, P.R.
- Official name: Puente Teodoro Moscoso
- Maintained by: Autopistas de Puerto Rico

Characteristics
- Design: Low-level trestle girder bridge
- Total length: 2.25 kilometers (1.40 mi)

History
- Opened: February 28, 1994; 32 years ago

Location
- Interactive map of Teodoro Moscoso Bridge

The Teodoro Moscoso Bridge (Spanish: Puente Teodoro Moscoso) is a 2.25 kilometers (1.40 mi) long, four-lane toll bridge in northeastern coastal Puerto Rico, crossing over the San José Lagoon and connecting the municipalities of San Juan and Carolina in the main metropolitan area of the archipelago and island since its opening in 1994. Serving as a west-east extension of the Jesus T. Piñero Expressway (PR-17), it links this thoroughfare in the Hato Rey and Río Piedras business and commercial centers in San Juan with the Román Baldorioty de Castro Expressway (PR-26) in the Isla Verde resort area in Carolina, becoming a direct passageway from and to Luis Muñoz Marín International Airport. The bridge, the longest in Puerto Rico, recognizably has flagpoles on both sides with alternating American and Puerto Rican flags.

View of the Teodoro Moscoso Bridge from Mt. Britton Tower in El Yunque National Forest, 2013

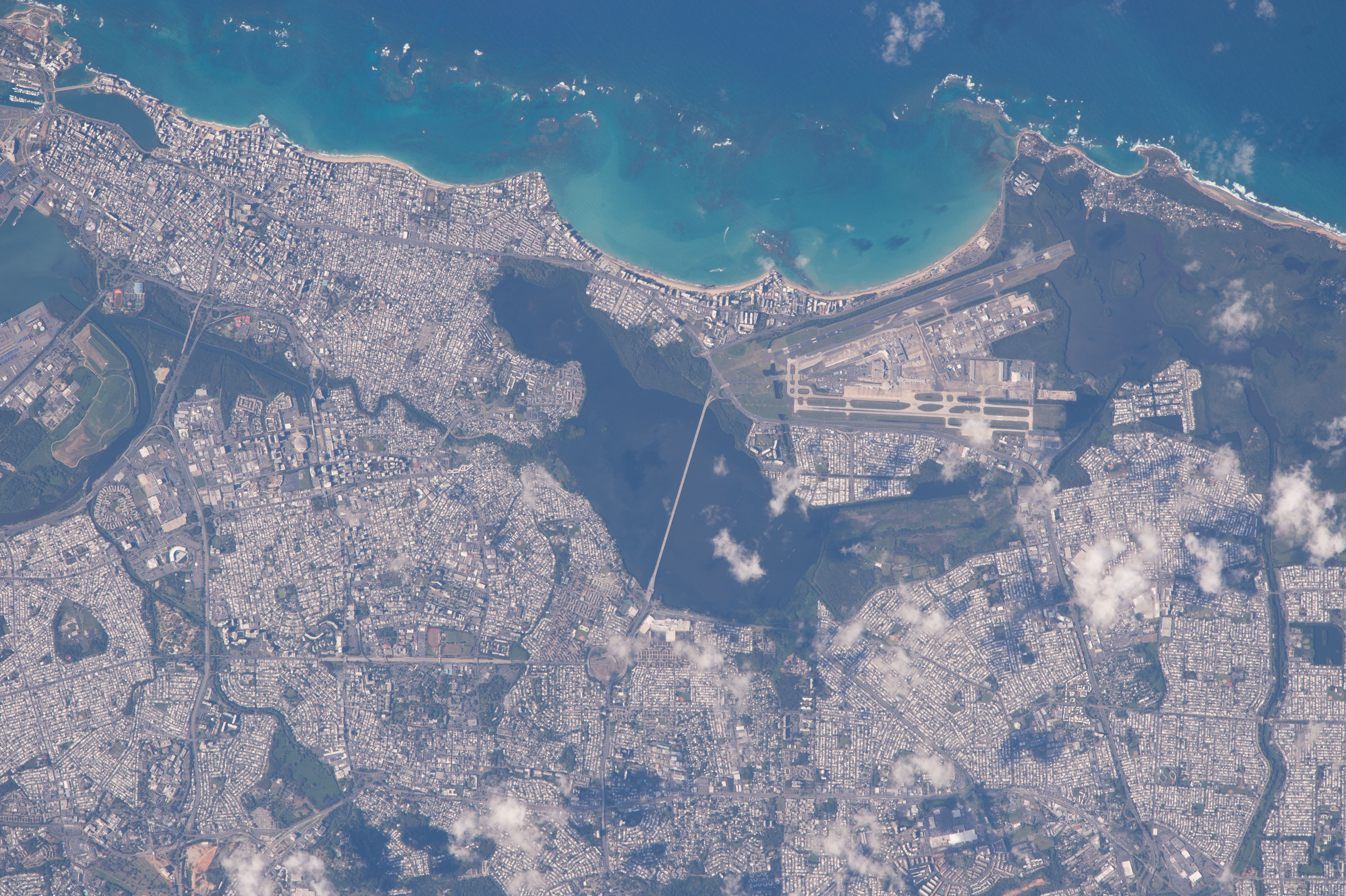
Satellite view from Condado district (upper left) in the San Juan capital municipality to Isla Verde area in the Carolina municipality with the Teodoro Moscoso Bridge visible (center), 2016

== Overview ==
As the longest bridge in Puerto Rico, the Teodoro Moscoso Bridge measures 1.40 miles (2.25 km) in length. It is located in the main metropolitan area of Puerto Rico in the northeastern coastal plain of the main island. Extending west-east from the Hato Rey and Rio Piedras business and commercial districts in the capital municipality of San Juan, it serves as a direct passageway from and to Luis Muñoz Marín International Airport in the Isla Verde resort area in the municipality of Carolina. It crosses over San José Lagoon, which forms part of the same estuary system of the nearby San Juan Bay.

The bridge was built with an investment of $126.8 million. It opened under the administration of Governor Pedro Rosselló as the first construction to be held under a public-private partnership in Puerto Rico and the United States.

The bridge formerly held one of the largest 10K races in the world, the World's Best 10K, which attracted thousands of local and international competitors through its duration.

In 2010, the bridge was used as a filming location for the climactic end of the vault chase scene in Universal Pictures' action heist film, Fast Five (2011), with Vin Diesel, Paul Walker, Dwayne Johnson, Elsa Pataky and Joaquim de Almeida present in the scene.

== Etymology ==
The Teodoro Moscoso Bridge is named after businessman and politician Teodoro Moscoso, who led the economic development and insdustralization of Puerto Rico under Operation Bootstrap in the 1940s and 1950s.

== Toll Plaza ==
Today, the bridge consists of electronic signs and a toll plaza with a fee of $3.85 in each direction. The bridge accepts AutoExpreso, Puerto Rico's toll transponder system.

Location	Toll	Direction	AutoExpreso acceptance	AutoExpreso replenishment (R) lane
San Juan-Carolina	$4.00	Two-way		

== See also ==
- List of bridges in the United States
- List of bridges by length
- Farmacias Moscoso
