= Laguna San José (Puerto Rico) =

Saline lake in Puerto Rico

San José Lagoon
- Laguna de San José (Spanish)
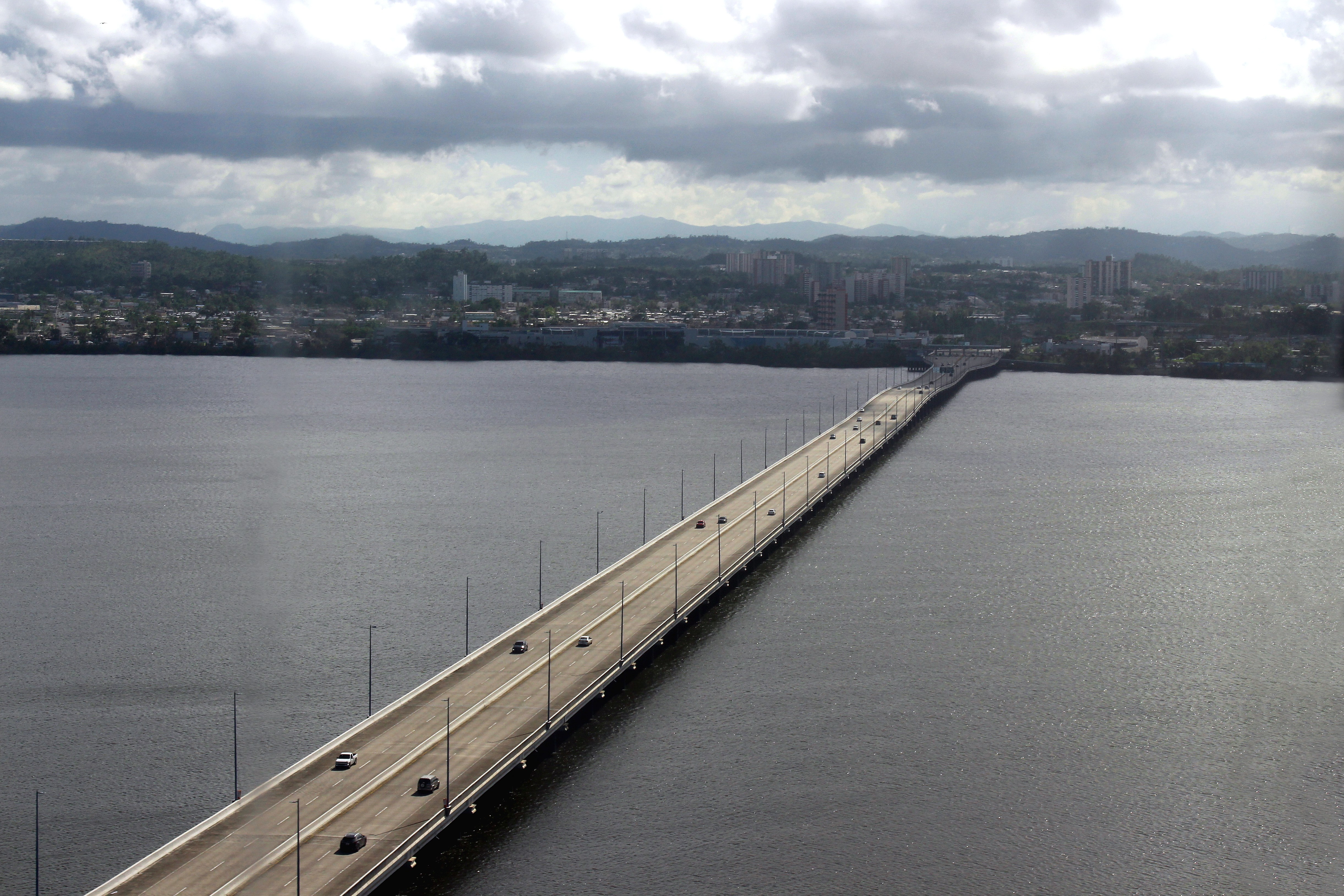
- Teodoro Moscoso Bridge (PR-17) crosses the San José Lagoon and connects Río Piedras and San Juan

- Location within Puerto Rico Location within the Caribbean
- Interactive map of San José Lagoon
- Location: San Juan, Puerto Rico
- Coordinates: 18°25′30″N 66°01′30″W
- Type: Saline lake
- Basin countries: Puerto Rico
- Surface area: 1,129 acres (457 ha)
- Max. depth: 36 feet (11 m)
- References: GNIS

The San José Lagoon (Spanish: Laguna de San José) is a shallow saline lake or lagoon located between the municipalities of San Juan and Carolina in northeast of the main island of Puerto Rico. Despite being located in a highly urbanized area, this body of water is important for its mangrove forests. The Teodoro Moscoso Bridge directly connects the Luis Muñoz Marín Airport in the Isla Verde resort and residential district to the Hato Rey financial and commercial center in the main metropolitan area of Puerto Rico.

== Ecology ==
The lagoon is of ecological importance due to the mangrove forests that grow on its shores which are home to numerous benthic species of flora and fauna. This ecosystem has been threatened due to the fast urbanization of San Juan and its urban area. Some of the fish species found in the lagoon are tarpon, ladyfish, and the common snook (Centropomus undecimalis). Green iguanas and caiman, which are invasive species in the region, are also common in the area.

== See also ==
- Condado Lagoon
- San Juan Bay
