= Puerto Rico Highway 199 =

Highway in Puerto Rico

Highway 199
- Ruta 199

Route information
- Maintained by Puerto Rico DTPW
- Length: 21.5 km (13.4 mi)

Western segment
- West end: Urbanización Portobello in Ortíz
- Major intersections: PR-167 in Pájaros; PR-5 in Minillas–Cerro Gordo
- East end: PR-831 in Minillas

Eastern segment
- West end: Conector Los Filtros in Santa Rosa
- Major intersections: PR-169 in Guaynabo barrio-pueblo; PR-20 in Guaynabo barrio-pueblo; PR-1 in Caimito; PR-52 in Monacillo; PR-176 in Cupey; PR-845 in Cuevas
- East end: PR-181 / PR-876 in Cuevas–St. Just

Location
- Country: United States
- Territory: Puerto Rico
- Municipalities: Toa Alta, Bayamón, Guaynabo, San Juan, Trujillo Alto

Highway system
- Roads in Puerto Rico; List
← PR-198	→ PR-200

Puerto Rico Highway 199 (PR-199) is a main highway, mostly divided, in San Juan, Puerto Rico and Guaynabo, Puerto Rico. It is one of the few highways in Puerto Rico with discontinuity, as there is also another Puerto Rico Highway 199 in Bayamón.

== Route description ==
=== San Juan to Guaynabo ===
In San Juan, near Trujillo Alto, it begins near PR-850 and PR-181 and goes through the exclusive Paseos area, goes west, intersecting Puerto Rico Highway 1, Puerto Rico Highway 52 and Puerto Rico Highway 20. It approaches downtown Guaynabo. Several schools can be found along the way.

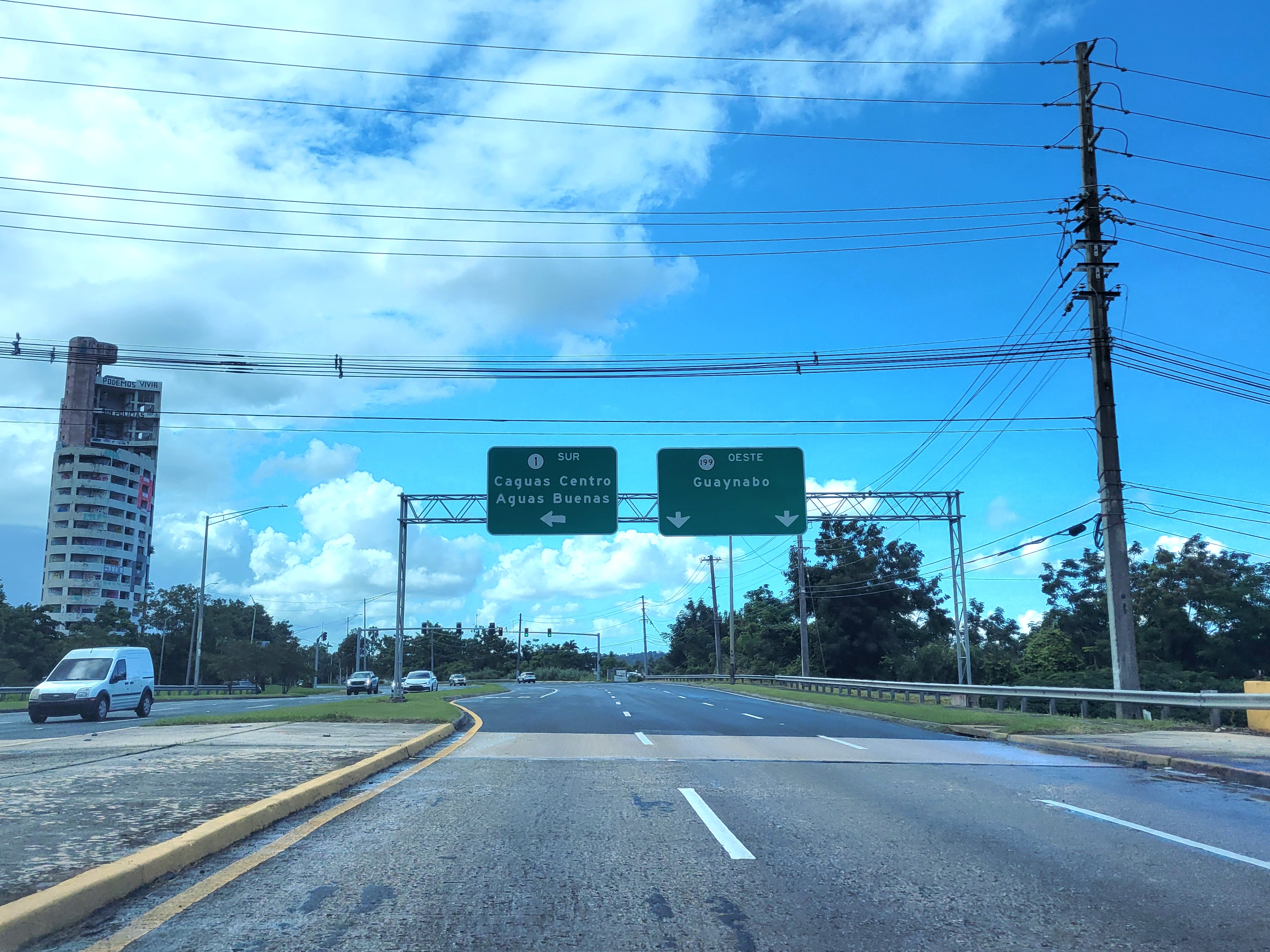
PR-199 west at PR-1 interchange in Caimito, San Juan

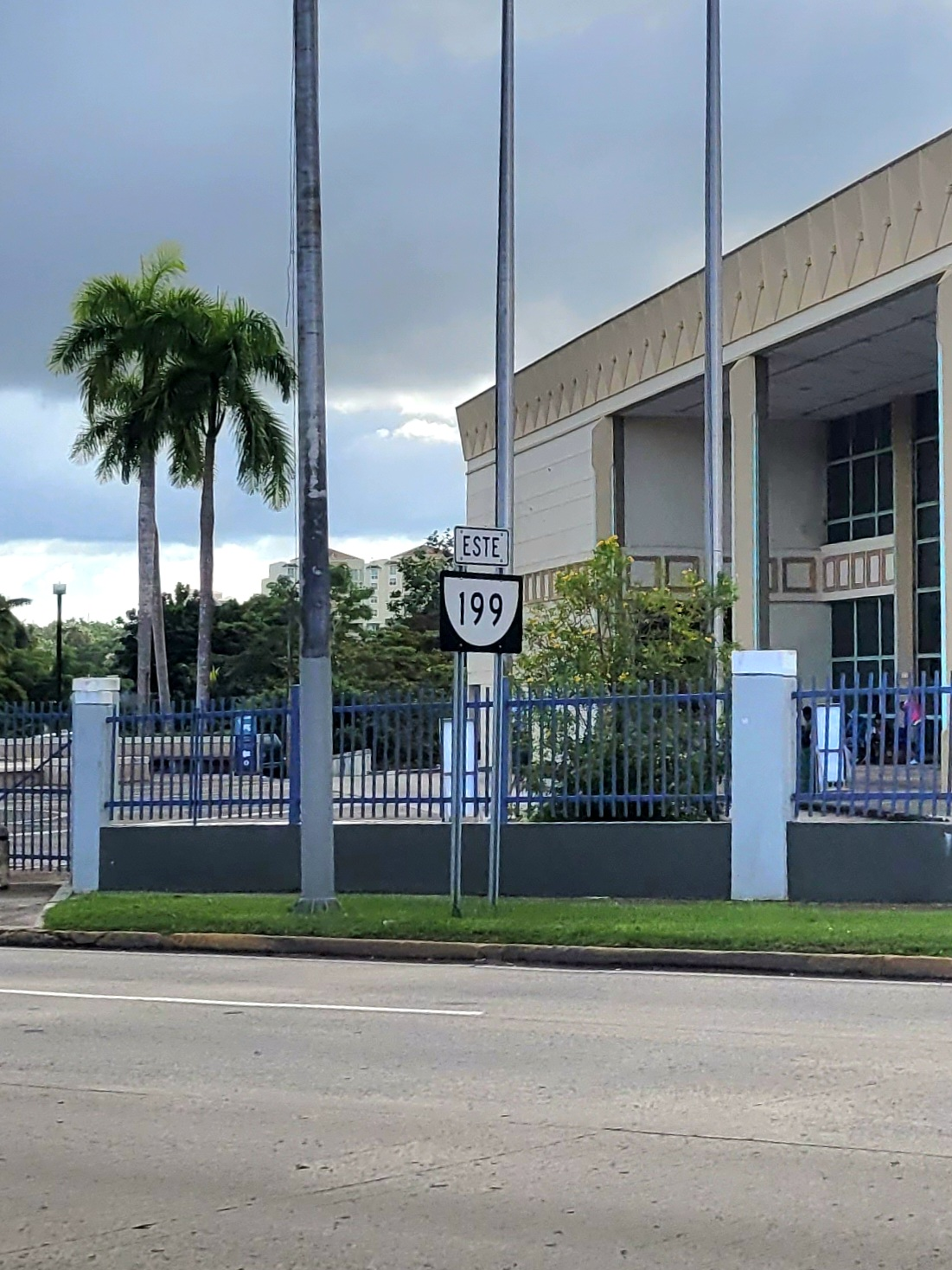
Eastbound sign in Guaynabo barrio-pueblo

=== Bayamón ===
Puerto Rico Highway 199 begins again at Puerto Rico Highway 5 and ends near Puerto Rico Highway 167. The segment is likely to be renumbered as Puerto Rico Highway 5 since the latter is being built into a tollway to Naranjito and Comerío and it shows to be not probable that PR-199 in Guaynabo will be connected to this segment in Bayamón.

== Major intersections ==
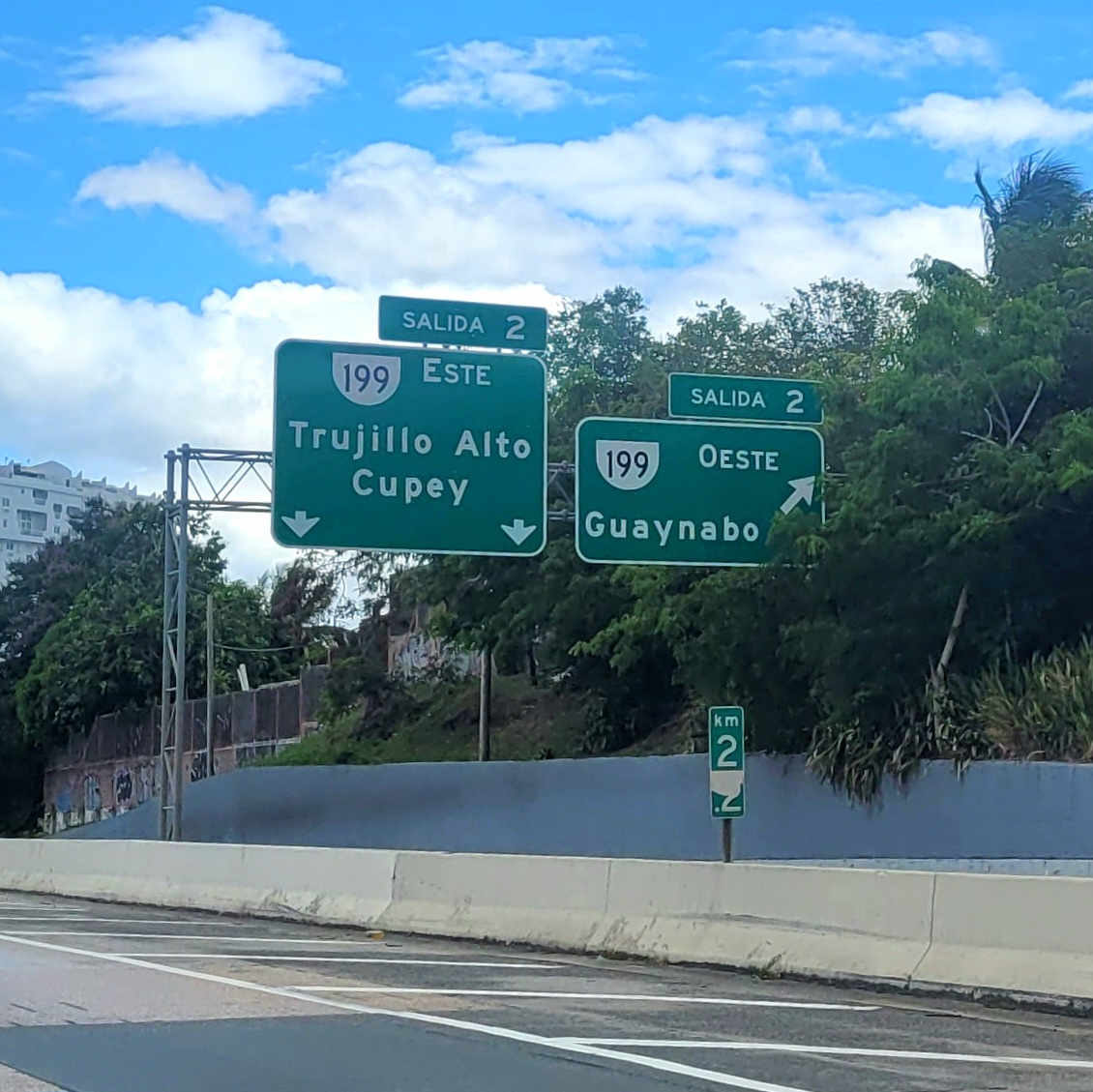
PR-52 south at exit 2 to PR-199 in Monacillo, San Juan

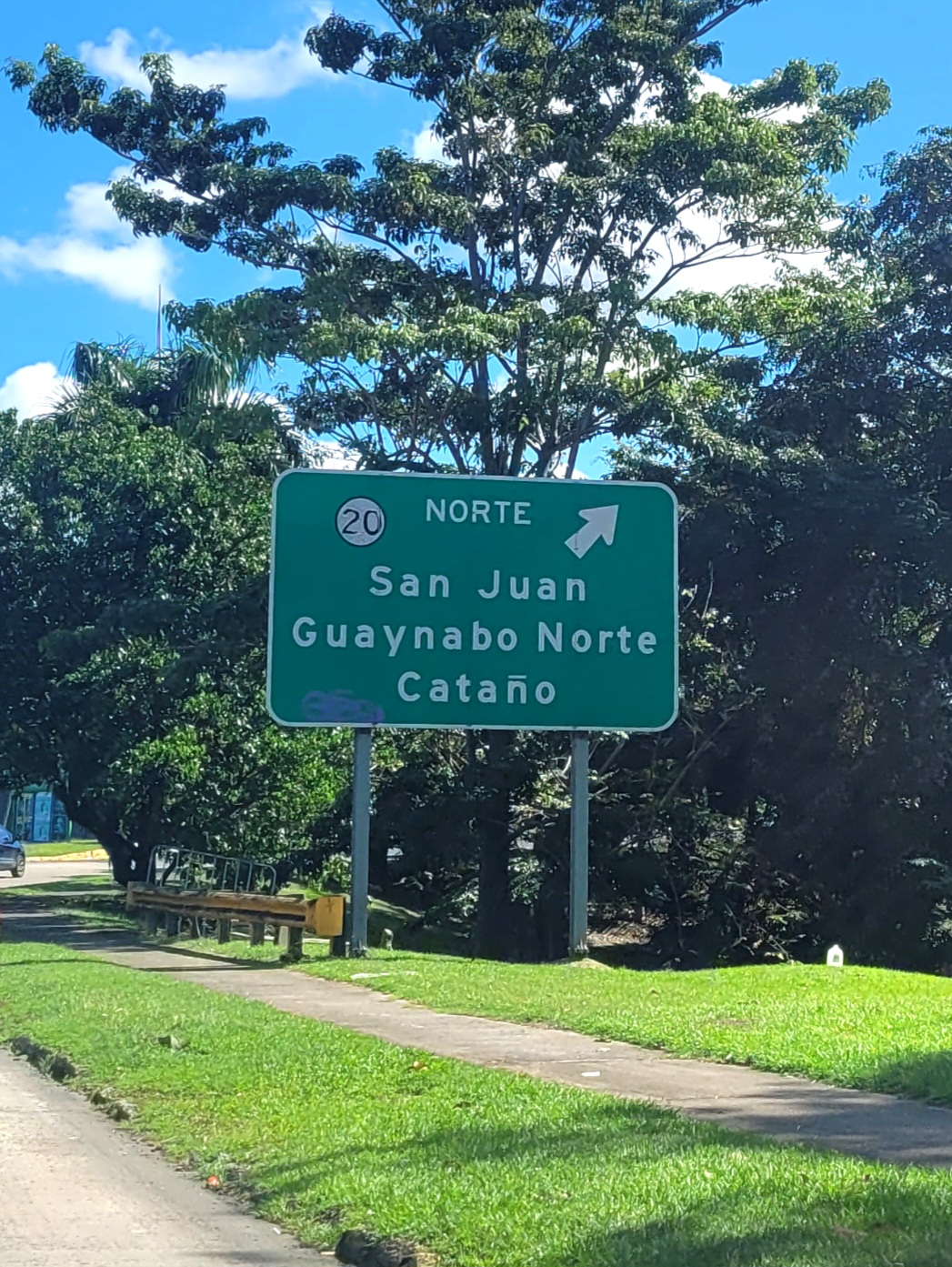
PR-199 east at PR-20 interchange between downtown Guaynabo and Frailes

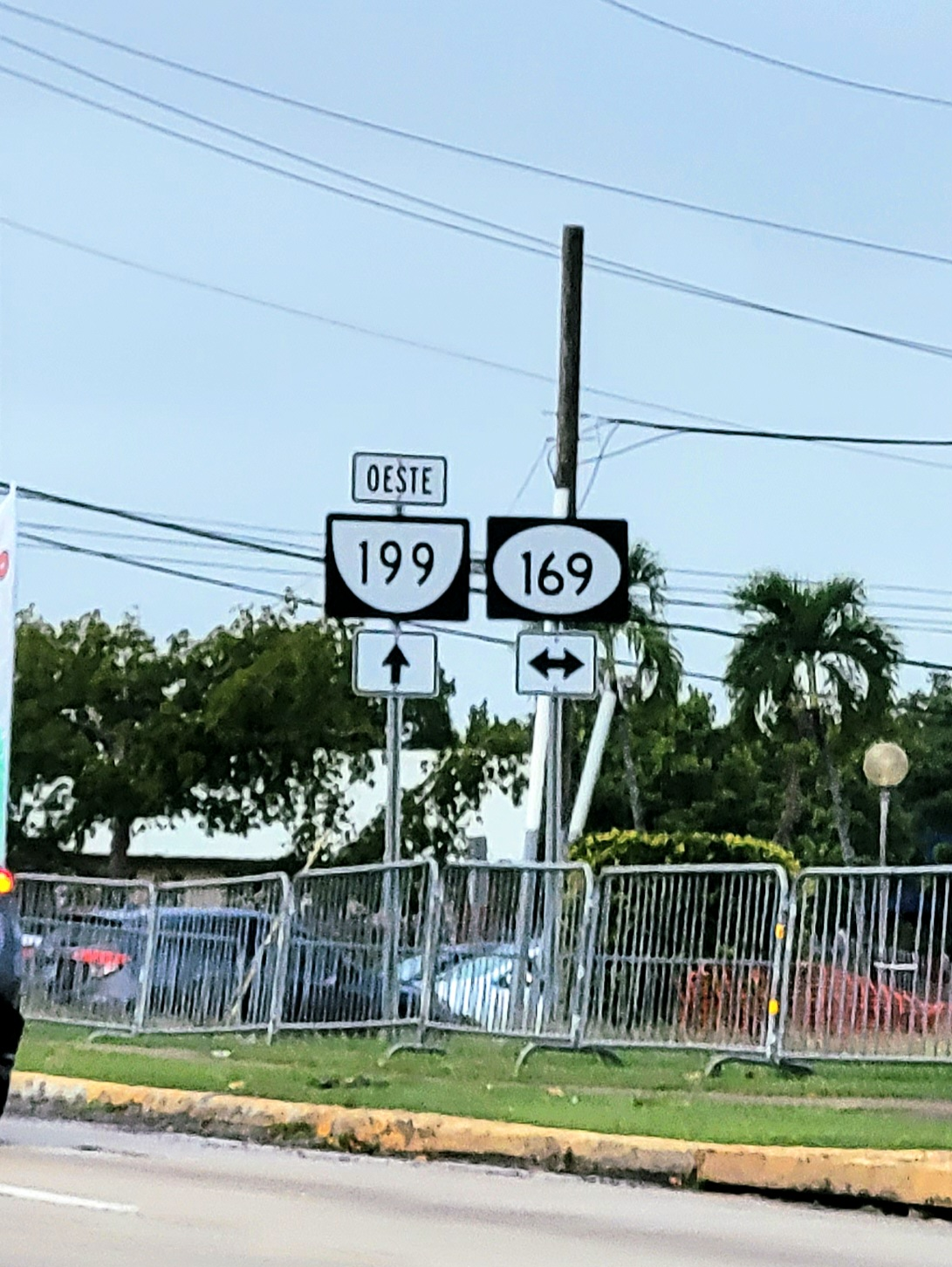
PR-199 west at PR-169 junction near downtown Guaynabo

Municipality	Location	km	mi	Destinations	Notes
Toa Alta	Ortíz	0.0	0.0	Western terminus of PR-199 at Urbanización Portobello	
Bayamón	Pájaros	2.0	1.2	PR-167 (Avenida Ramón Luis Rivera) – Bayamón, Comerío	
Bayamón	Cerro Gordo	3.4	2.1	PR-840 (Camino Aldea) – Aldea, Cerro Gordo	
Bayamón	Minillas–Cerro Gordo line	4.2	2.6	PR-5 north (Expreso Río Hondo) – Bayamón, Cataño	Seagull intersection
Bayamón	Minillas	5.7	3.5	PR-831 (Avenida Minillas) – Minillas	Eastern terminus of western segment
Temporary gap in PR-199
Guaynabo	Santa Rosa	8.1	5.0	PR-Conector Los Filtros – Bayamón	Western terminus of eastern segment; roundabout
Guaynabo	Guaynabo barrio-pueblo	10.4	6.5	PR-169 (Calle José R. Carazo) – Guaynabo, Bayamón, San Juan	
Guaynabo	Guaynabo barrio-pueblo	10.7	6.6	PR-20 (Expreso Rafael Martínez Nadal) – San Juan, Cataño, Caguas, Aguas Buenas	PR-20 exit 5; partial cloverleaf interchange
Guaynabo	Frailes	11.4	7.1	PR-838 (Camino Alejandrino) – Río Piedras	
San Juan	Caimito	13.0	8.1	PR-1 (Carretera Felipe "La Voz" Rodríguez) – San Juan, Río Piedras, Caguas, Aguas Buenas	Eastern terminus of Avenida Las Cumbres; western terminus of Avenida Doña Felisa Rincón de Gautier; partial cloverleaf interchange
San Juan	Caimito	13.5	8.4	PR-842 – Caimito	
San Juan	Monacillo	15.0	9.3	PR-52 (Autopista Luis A. Ferré) – San Juan, Río Piedras, Caguas, Ponce	PR-52 exit 2; diamond interchange
San Juan	Cupey	16.8	10.4	PR-176 – Río Piedras, Cupey	
San Juan	Cupey	18.1	11.2	PR-844 – Río Piedras, Cupey	Diamond interchange
Trujillo Alto	Cuevas	19.5– 19.6	12.1– 12.2	PR-845 – Cuevas, Cupey	Eastern terminus of Avenida Doña Felisa Rincón de Gautier; western terminus of Carretera Pedro L. Negrón Ramírez
Trujillo Alto	Cuevas	20.3– 20.4	12.6– 12.7	PR-846 – Cuevas, Río Piedras	
Trujillo Alto	Cuevas	21.1– 21.2	13.1– 13.2	PR-850 – Cuevas	No left turn from westbound
Trujillo Alto	Cuevas–St. Just line	21.5	13.4	PR-181 (Expreso Manuel Rivera Morales) / PR-876 (Carretera Federico Degetau) – Trujillo Alto, Río Piedras	Eastern terminus of PR-199
1.000 mi = 1.609 km; 1.000 km = 0.621 mi: Incomplete access; Route transition; Unopened
