= Puerto Rico Highway 175 =

Highway in Puerto Rico

Highway 175
- Ruta 175

Route information
- Maintained by Puerto Rico DTPW
- Length: 13.6 km (8.5 mi)
- Existed: 1953–present

Major junctions
- South end: PR-1 in Río Cañas
- PR-176 in Carraízo; PR-894 in Carraízo; PR-843 in Carraízo; PR-845 in Carraízo; PR-876 in Cuevas
- North end: PR-181 / PR-8860 in Cuevas–Saint Just

Location
- Country: United States
- Territory: Puerto Rico
- Municipalities: Caguas, Trujillo Alto

Highway system
- Roads in Puerto Rico; List
← PR-174	→ PR-176

Puerto Rico Highway 175 (PR-175) is a rural road that travels from Caguas, Puerto Rico to Trujillo Alto. This highway begins at PR-1 in Río Cañas and ends at PR-181 near downtown Trujillo Alto.

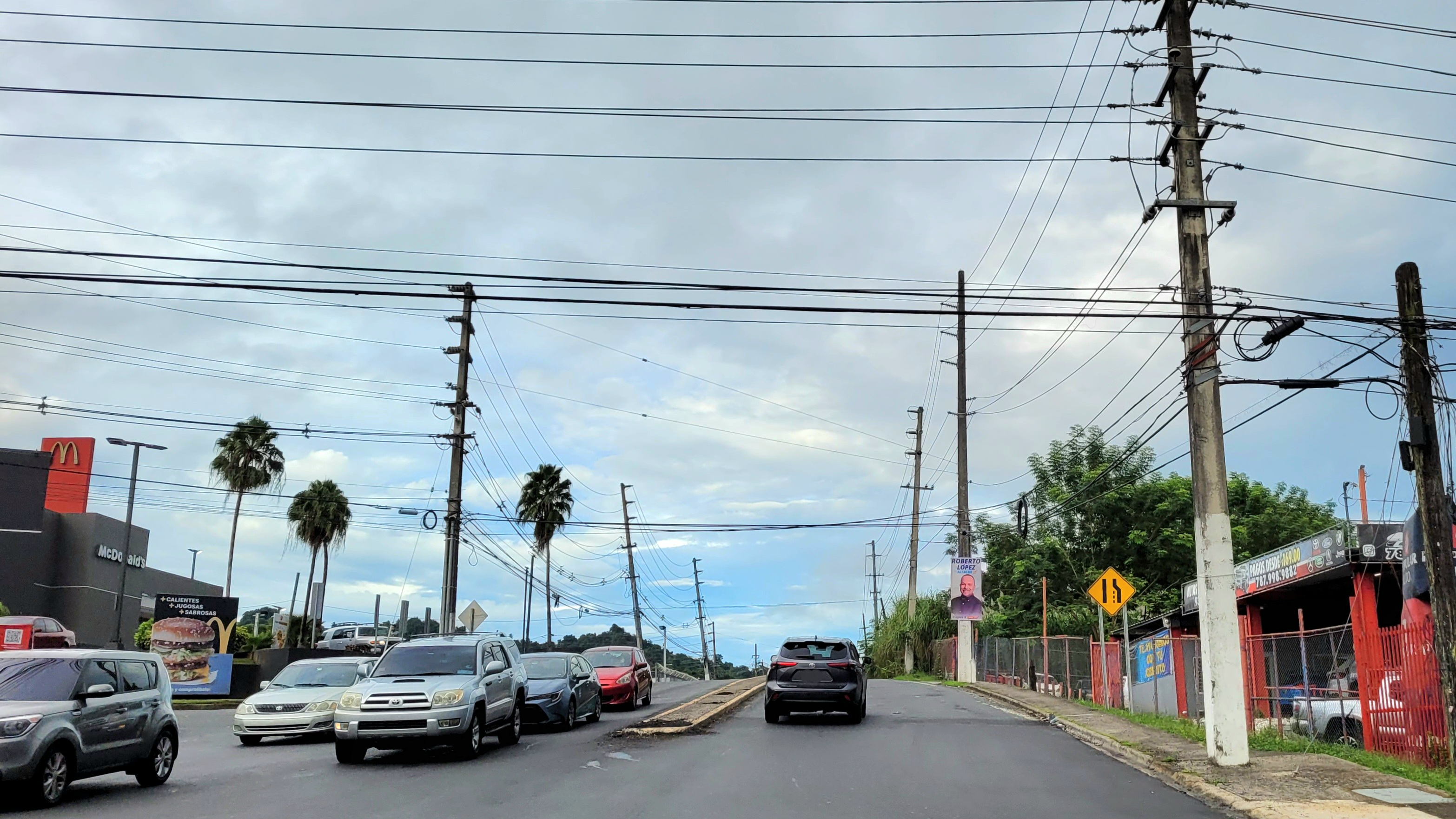
Northbound beginning of PR-175 in Río Cañas, leaving PR-1 junction

== Major intersections ==
Municipality	Location	km	mi	Destinations	Notes
Caguas	Río Cañas	0.0	0.0	PR-1 (Carretera Miguel Hernández Rodríguez) – Caguas, Guaynabo	Southern terminus of PR-175
Caguas	San Antonio	1.9	1.2	PR-739 – San Antonio	
Trujillo Alto	Carraízo	4.6	2.9	PR-176 – Cupey	
Trujillo Alto	Carraízo	10.9	6.8	PR-894 – Trujillo Alto, San Juan	
Trujillo Alto	Carraízo	11.0	6.8	PR-843 – Carraízo	
Trujillo Alto	Carraízo	11.8	7.3	PR-845 – Cupey	
Trujillo Alto	Cuevas	13.5– 13.6	8.4– 8.5	PR-876 (Carretera Federico Degetau) – Trujillo Alto	
Trujillo Alto	Cuevas–St. Just line	13.6	8.5	PR-181 (Expreso Manuel Rivera Morales) – Trujillo Alto, Río Piedras	Northern terminus of PR-175 and western terminus of PR-8860
Trujillo Alto	Cuevas–St. Just line	13.6	8.5	PR-8860 east – Carolina	Continuation beyond PR-181
1.000 mi = 1.609 km; 1.000 km = 0.621 mi

== See also ==
- 1953 Puerto Rico highway renumbering
