= List of barrios and sectors of Caguas, Puerto Rico =

List of sectors of Caguas, Puerto Rico

Like all municipalities of Puerto Rico, Caguas is subdivided into administrative units called barrios, which are, in contemporary times, roughly comparable to minor civil divisions, (and means wards or boroughs or neighborhoods in English). The barrios and subbarrios, in turn, are further subdivided into smaller local populated place areas/units called sectores (sectors in English). The types of sectores may vary, from normally sector to urbanización to reparto to barriada to residencial, among others.

The 11 barrios of the municipality of Caguas are further subdivided into a total of 461 sectores. The number of sectores in a barrio varies widely from 10 (Barrio San Antonio) to 90 (Barrio Cañabóncito) and 101 (Barrio-Pueblo).

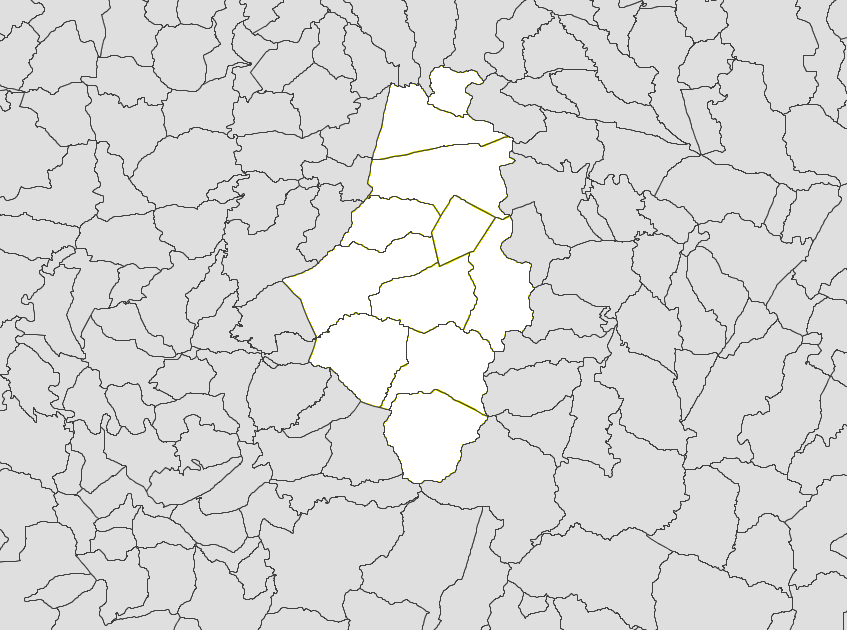
Caguas map with barrio subdivisions

== List of sectors by barrio ==
=== Beatriz ===
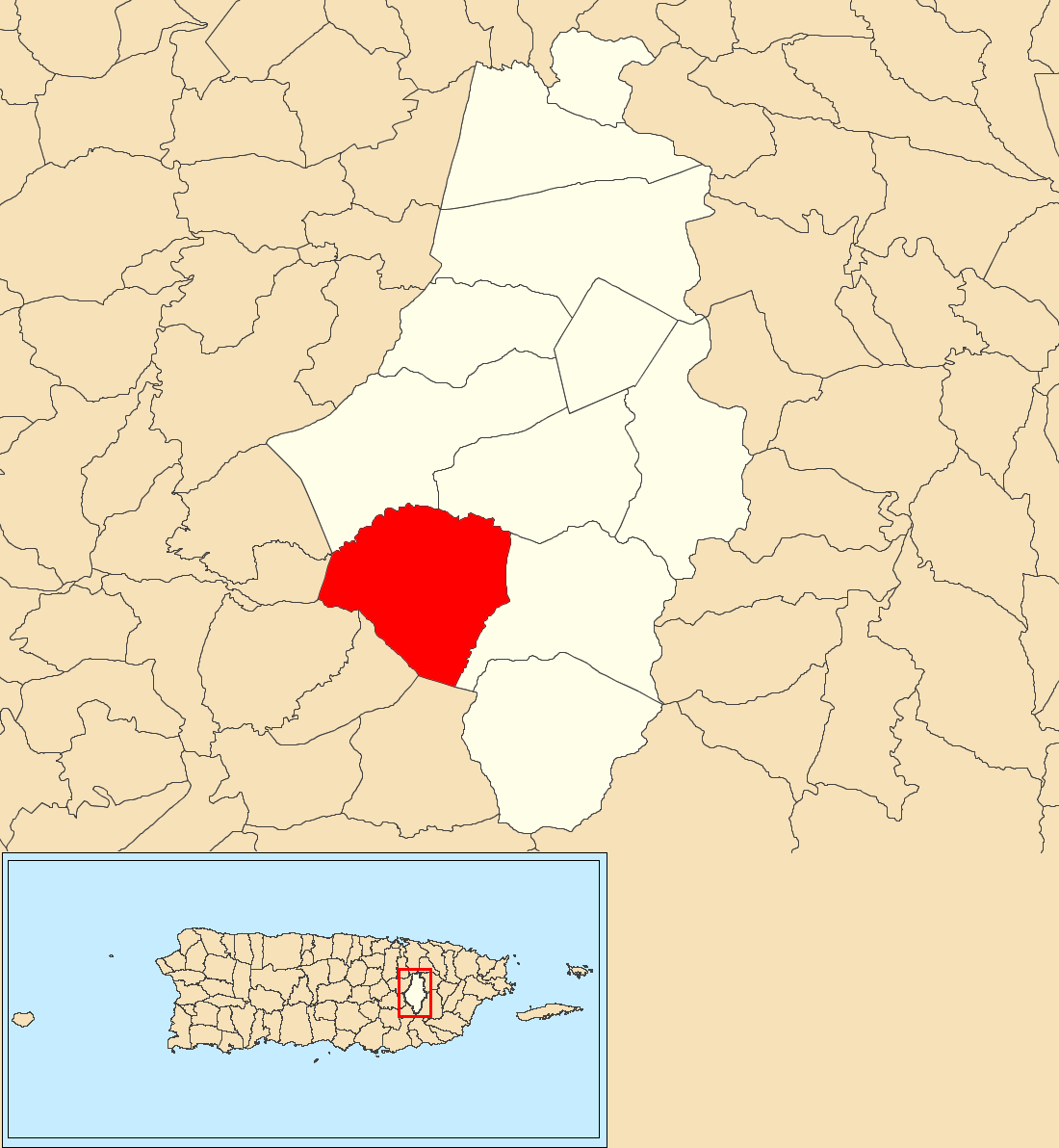
Barrio Beatriz in Caguas

1. Alturas de Beatriz
2. Alturas de Caguas (Beatriz)
3. Bo. Beatriz
4. Colinas de Villa Coquí
5. La Jurado
6. Las Abejas
7. Los Ortíz
8. Los Panes
9. Muñoz Grillo
10. Piñas I
11. Piñas II
12. Piñas III
13. Villa Paolo

=== San Salvador ===
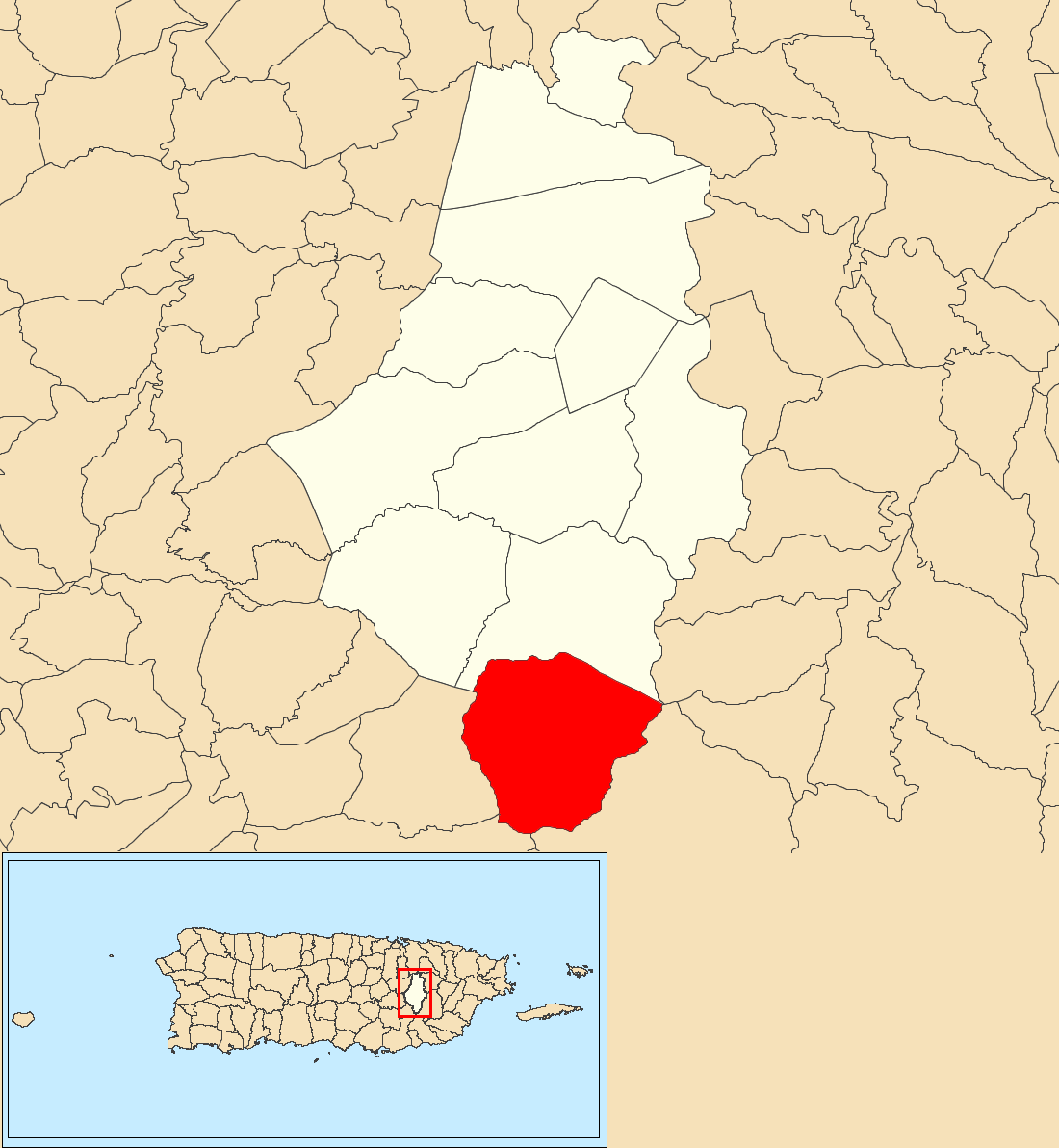
Barrio San Salvador in Caguas

1. Anon Ruta I
2. El Lomo
3. Hacienda Lilimar
4. Hato Abajo
5. Hato Arriba
6. La Plaza
7. Los Cipreses
8. Los Rosales
9. Maracal
10. Morena
11. Río Abajo

=== Borinquen ===
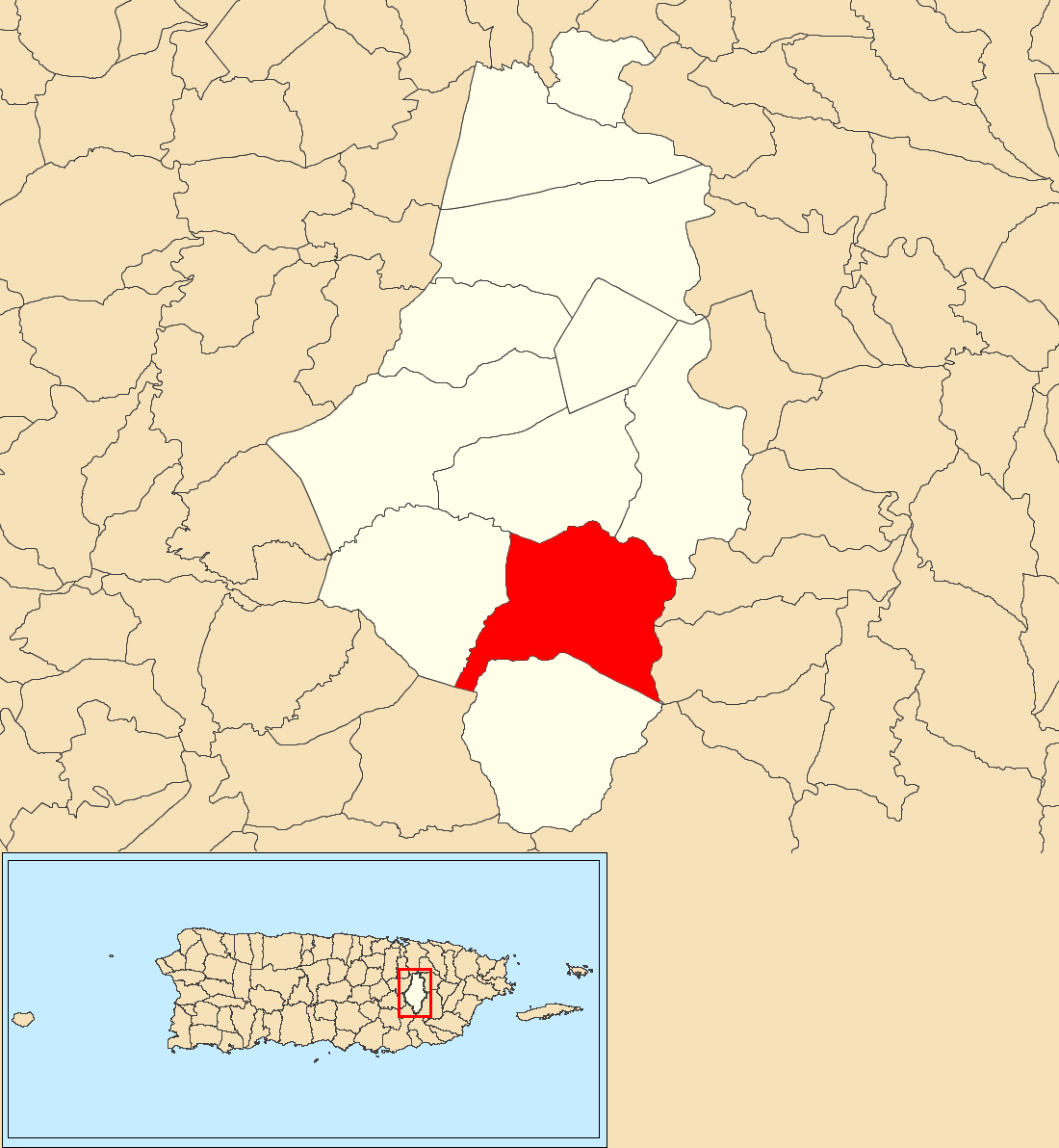
Barrio Borinquen in Caguas

1. Alturas de/Padre Miguel
2. Alturas de Caguas (Borinquen)
3. Anon Ruta II
4. Bo. Borinquen
5. Atravezada
6. Valley
7. Bosques de La Sierra
8. Buenos Aires
9. Felipito Flores
10. Jensen
11. JuanXXIII
12. La Charca
13. La Loma del Viento
14. Lajita
15. Los Ángeles
16. Los Báez (Borinquen)
17. Naranjito
18. Parcelas Nuevas
19. Parcelas Viejas
20. Pradera
21. Terrazas de
22. Villas Saurí

=== Tomás de Castro ===
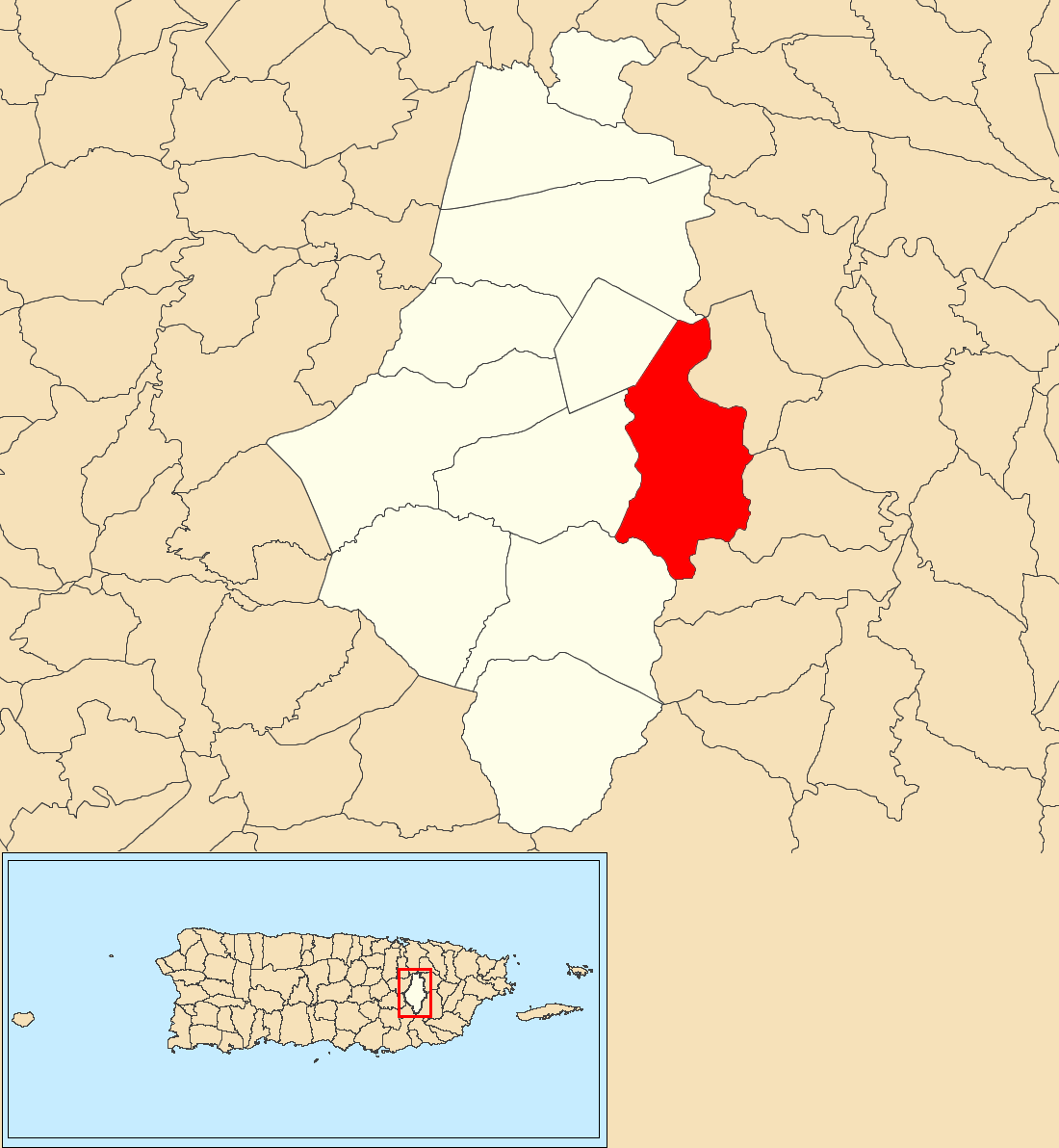
Barrio Tomás de Castro in Caguas

1. Apts. Santa Cecilia
2. Barrancas (La Vía)
3. Bo. Tomás de Castro
4. Caguax
5. Caribe Gardens
6. Colegio Cristo de los Milagros
7. Columbia College
8. El Cinco
9. El Cinco (Loma Linda)
10. El Tamarindo
11. Hacienda Borinquen
12. José Mercado
13. La Loma
14. La Meseta
15. La Palmera
16. La Vaquería
17. Las Haciendas
18. Loma Linda
19. Los Adorno
20. Los Claudio
21. Los Flores
22. Los Montañez
23. Los Muleros
24. Montifiori
25. Parcelas I
26. Parcelas II
27. Parque Las Mercedes
28. Paseo del Río
29. River Park
30. San Rafael
31. Santa Cecilia
32. Santa Elvira
33. Santa Rosa
34. Tomás de Castro I
35. Tomás de Castro II
36. Valle Hermoso
37. Villa Borinquen
38. Villa Cariño
39. Villa Confianza
40. Villa Criollos
41. Villa Guadalupe
42. Villa Las Mercedes
43. Villa María
44. Villa Victoria
45. Villas de Castro
46. Villas de Castro - Gardens Apartments

=== Río Cañas ===
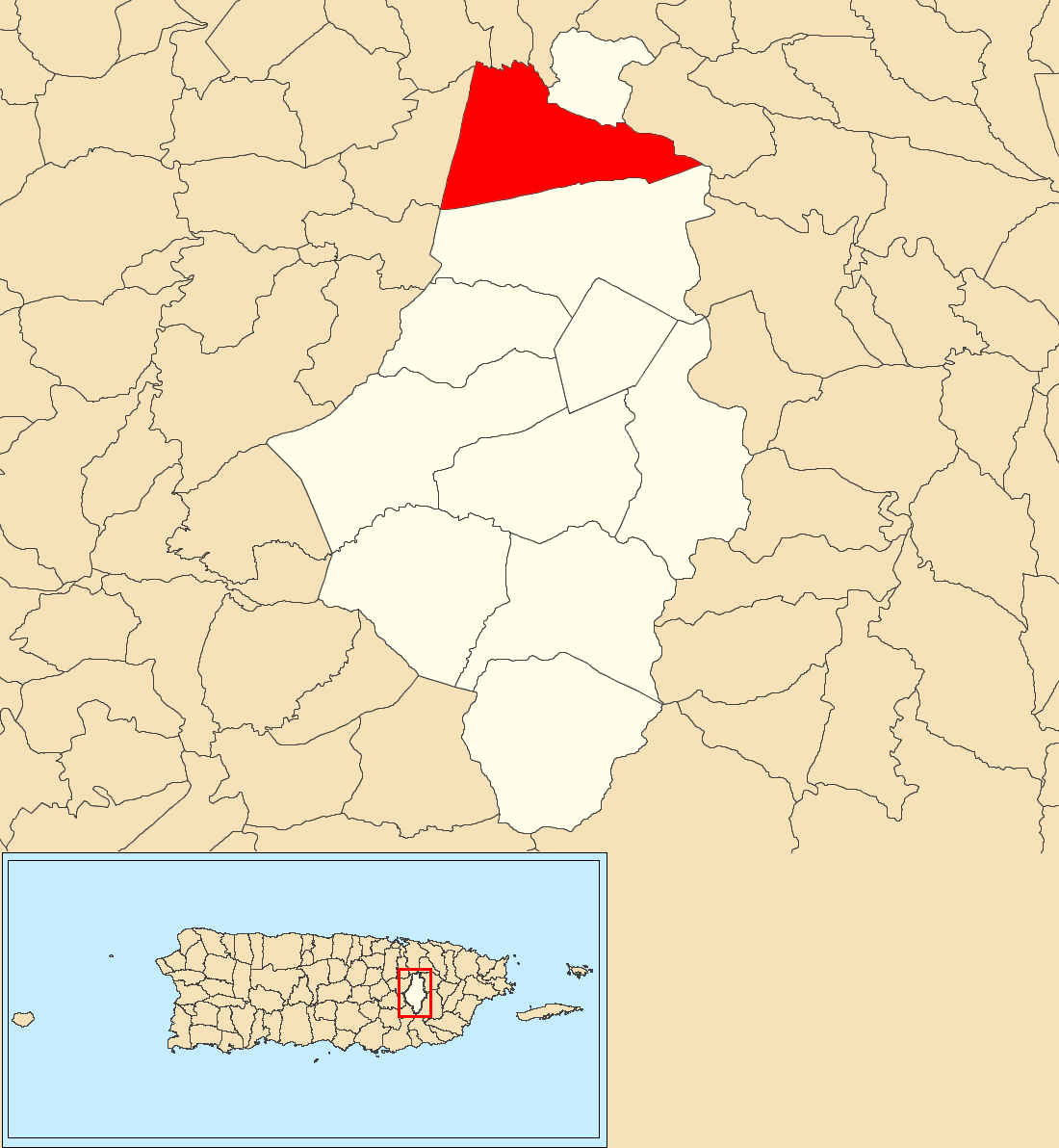
Barrio Río Cañas in Caguas

1. Aquí me quedo
2. Área Industrial
3. Bo. Río Cañas
4. Borinquen Memorial Park I
5. Borinquen Memorial Park II
6. Campo Chico
7. Campo Real
8. El Coquí
9. El Edén
10. El Naranjal
11. Estancias del Lago
12. Hoyo Frío (Villa Marcela)
13. La Barra
14. La Barra - Los Ápostoles
15. La Barra - Los Camacho
16. La Barra - Los Muchos
17. La Changa
18. La Changa - Los Ángeles de
19. La Changa - Los Esteves
20. La Changa - Villa Burgos
21. La Guasabara
22. La Mesa
23. La Ponderosa
24. Lakeview Estates
25. Parque de Luz
26. Quebrada Arenas
27. Quintas de las Américas
28. Quintas de San Luis
29. Quintas de San Luis II
30. Reparto Solano
31. San Pedro Estates
32. Twin Valley
33. Valle del Lago
34. Valle San Luis
35. Villa Vietnam - La Liga / Sector Arroyo

=== Cañabón ===
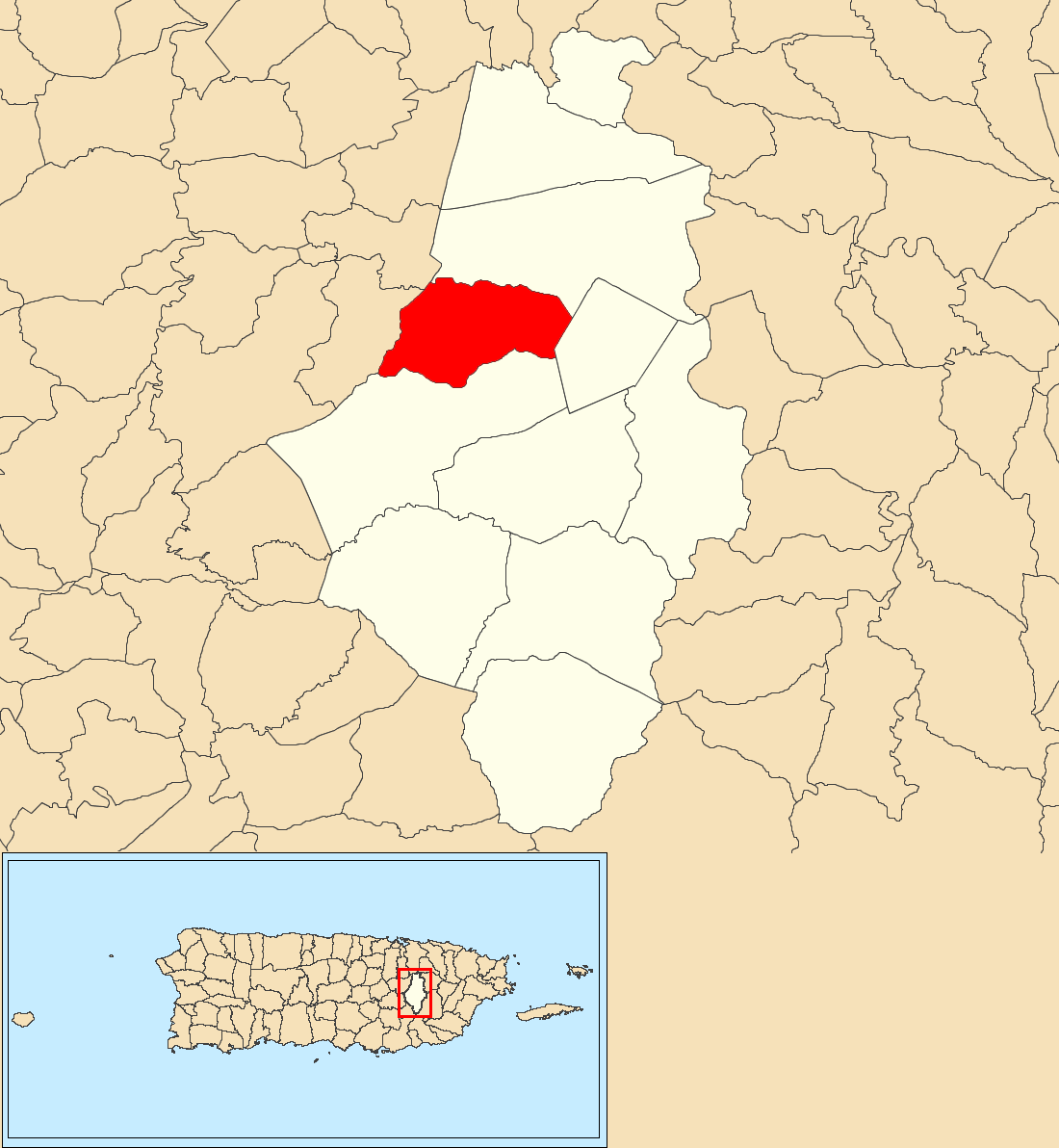
Barrio Cañabón in Caguas

1. Apts. Vistas del Río
2. Bo. Cañabón
3. Cementerio Municipal 3
4. Centro de Empresas Emergentes
5. Complejo Deportivo
6. Del Rio Shopping Mall
7. Hacienda San José
8. Hacienda San José - Asomante
9. Hacienda San José - Cautiva
10. Hacienda San José - La Estancia
11. Hacienda San José - Las Nubes
12. Hacienda San José - Puerta del Parque
13. Hacienda San José - Sanjuanera
14. Hacienda San José - Sureña
15. Hacienda San José - Villa Caribe
16. Idamaris Gardens
17. Jardín Botánico y Cultural William Miranda Marín
18. La Unión
19. Los Lozada
20. Los Prados
21. Los Prados - Armonía
22. Los Prados - El Valle
23. Los Prados - Islabella
24. Los Prados - La Reserva
25. Los Prados - Plaza Los Prados
26. Los Prados - Serenna
27. Monte Borrás
28. Parque del Monte
29. Parque del Río
30. Parque del Turabo
31. Parque Industrial Carr.156
32. Parque Las Haciendas
33. Pozo Dulce
34. Turabo Cluster
35. Valle Tolima

=== Cañaboncito ===
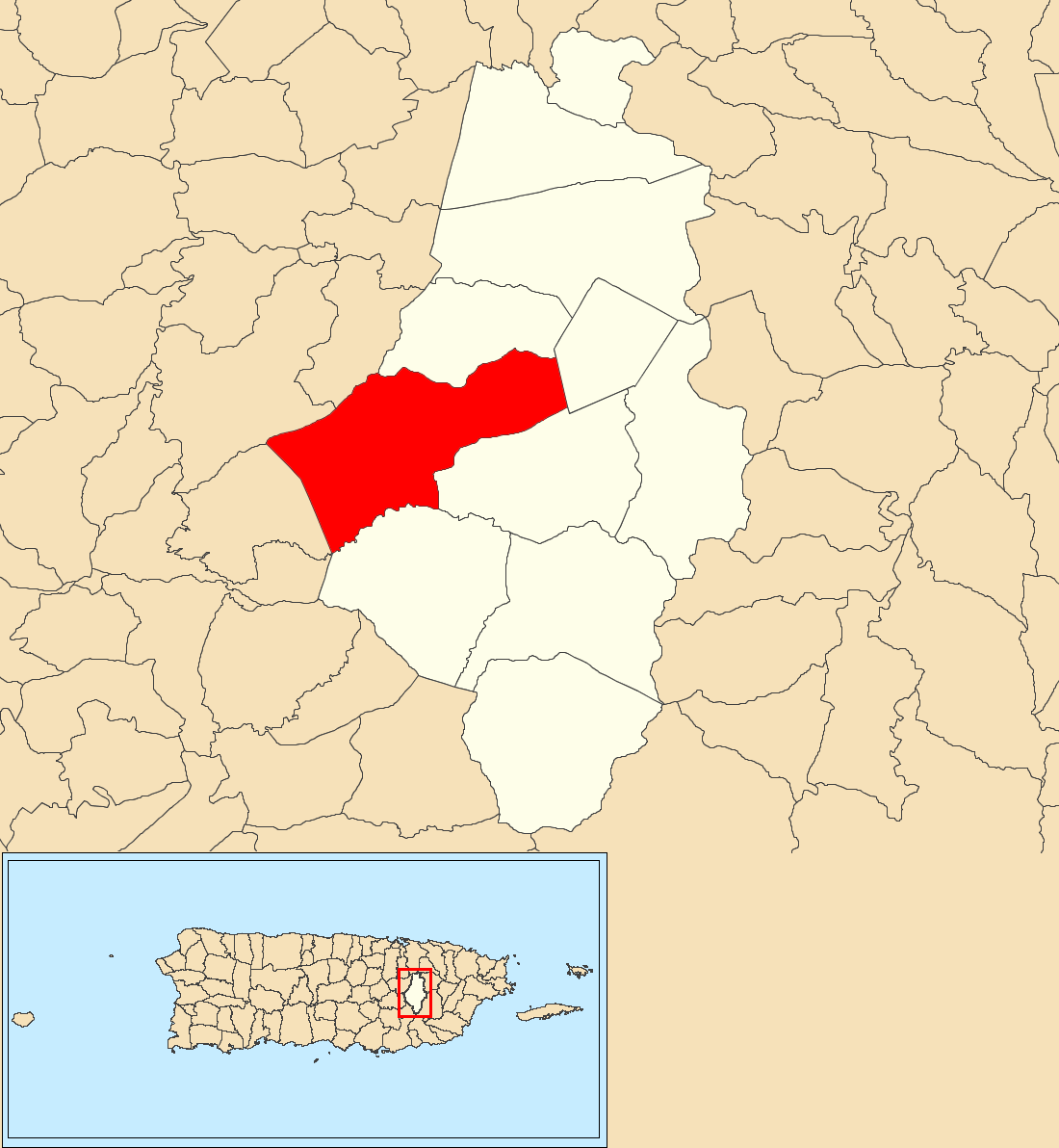
Barrio Cañaboncito in Caguas

1. Alto de las Flores
2. Alturas de Villa del Rey
3. Apts. San Antonio
4. Bo. Cañaboncito
5. Bonneville Apts.
6. Bonneville Hgts. I
7. Bonneville Hgts. II
8. Bonneville Manor
9. Bonneville Townhouses
10. Bonneville Valley
11. Brisas del Monte/Parcelas Nuevas
12. Bucaná
13. Buena Vista (Cañaboncito)
14. Caguas Tower
15. Camino a las Torres
16. Camino Real
17. Arriba
18. Carrasquillo
19. Certenejas II
20. Colegio Bautista
21. Ctro. Comercial Turabo Gard.
22. El Chaparral
23. El Mirador Apts.
24. El Paraíso
25. Estancias Degetau
26. Estancias del Bosque
27. Estancias La Sierra
28. Hector Colón
29. Hogar Cristo Rey
30. Hormigas
31. Hormigas - Bachiche
32. Hormigas - Benito Guzmáz
33. Hormigas - Cano Rivera
34. Hormigas - Capilla Sagrada
35. Hormigas - Carrasco
36. Hormigas - Casimiro Báez
37. Hormigas - Cheo Nieves
38. Hormigas - Cundo Rodríguez
39. Hormigas - Emilio González
40. Hormigas - Estancias del Carmen
41. Hormigas - Los González
42. Hormigas - Los Hermanos
43. Hormigas - Los Pérez
44. Hormigas - Tabonuco
45. Hormigas - Villa Marina
46. Hormigas - Villas del Campo
47. Hormigas Los Flores
48. Hosp. Menonita
49. Juan León
50. La Cantera
51. La Cantera - La Rampla
52. La Cantera - Tico Álamo
53. La Esmeralda
54. La Pajilla
55. La Sierra
56. La Sierra
57. La Sierra - Los Ayala
58. La Sierra - Los Serrano
59. La Sierra - Montebrisas
60. Los Báez (Beatriz)
61. Los Flamboyanes (Cañaboncito)
62. Los Meléndez
63. Los Orellana
64. Los Quintana
65. Los Solá
66. Los Velázquez
67. Los Zayas
68. Palmas del Turabo
69. Parcelas
70. Parques de Bonneville
71. Paseo Degetau
72. Plaza Degetau Shopping Center
73. Reparto San José
74. Res. Bonneville Hgts.
75. Res. Turabo Heights
76. Sec. García
77. Shufford Court
78. Turabo Gardens 1ra, 2da, 3ra Sec.
79. Turabo Gardens 4ta Sec.
80. Turabo Gardens 5ta Sec.
81. Urb. Los Pinos
82. Villa Cáliz II
83. Villa del Rey 4ta Sec.
84. Villa del Rey 5ta Sec.
85. Villa Hermosa
86. Villa Turabo
87. Villa Vigía
88. Villas de Oro
89. Vista Real I
90. Vista Real II

=== San Antonio ===
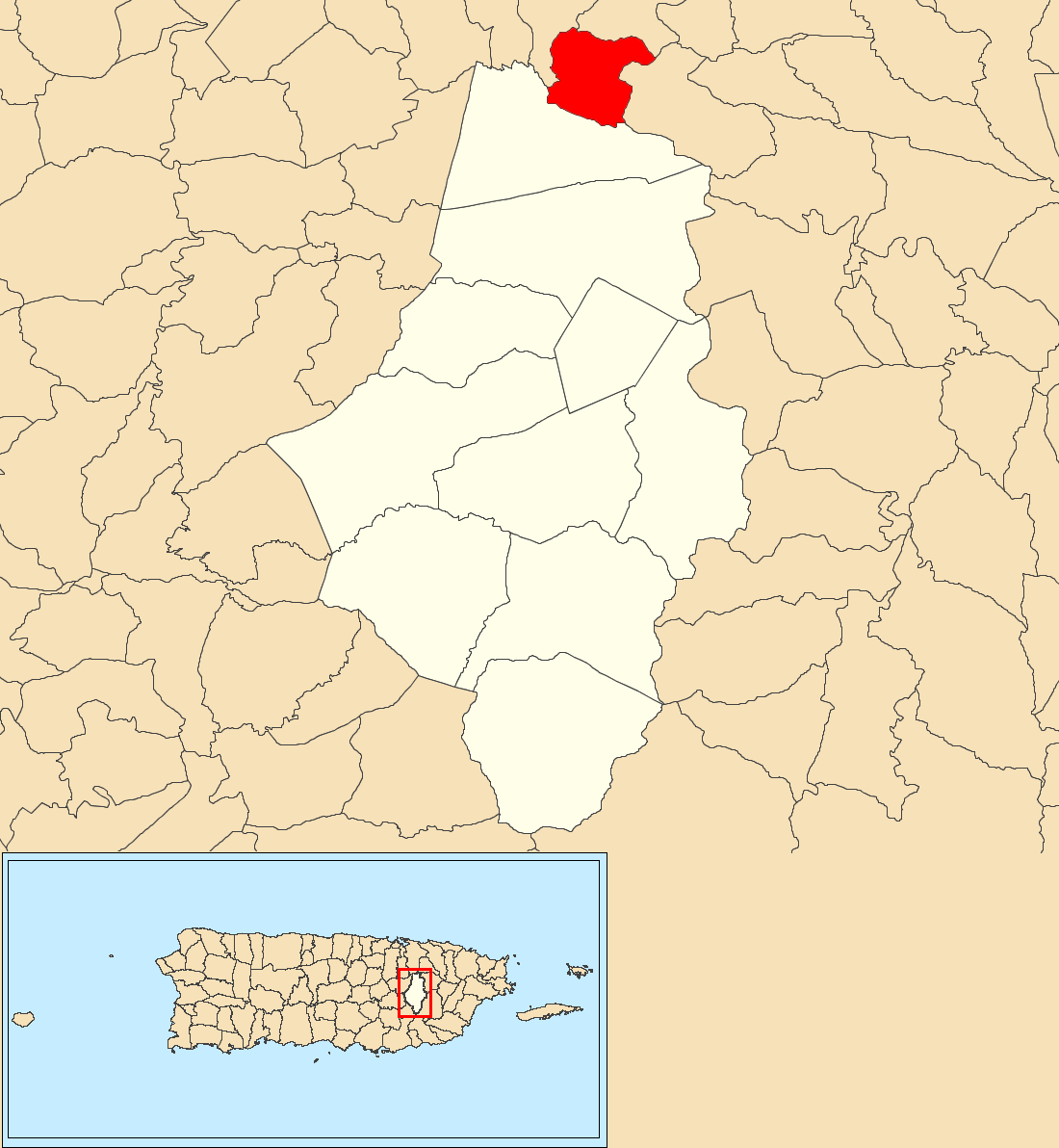
Barrio San Antonio in Caguas

1. Bo. San Antonio
2. Buena Vista (S. Antonio)
3. Buena Vista (S. Antonio) - Las Penas
4. Cuatro Calles
5. El Faro
6. José A Díaz
7. La Cuchilla
8. Los Matress/Las Carmelitas
9. Los Pinos
10. Monte Lago
11. Sur de las Américas

=== Pueblo ===
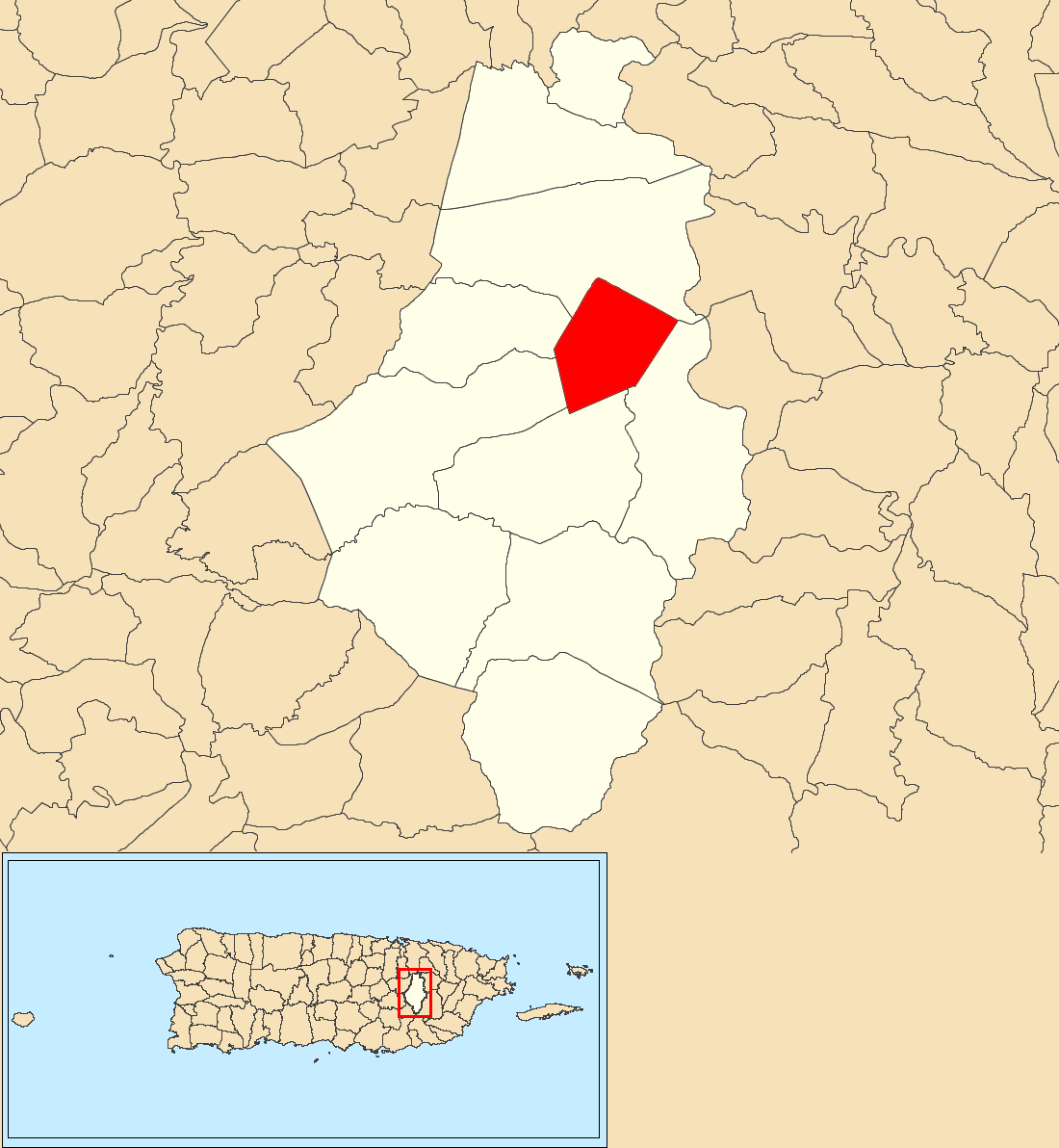
Barrio-Pueblo in Caguas

1. Angora
2. Apts. Bunker
3. Apts. Notre Dame
4. Área Comercial Ave. Gautier Benítez
5. Área Comercial Ave. Joviniano
6. Barriada Morales
7. Barriada Morales - Balcones de Las Catalinas
8. Batista
9. Billy Suárez
10. Bo. Pueblo
11. Bonneville Gardens
12. Bonneville Terrace
13. Borinquen (Urb.)
14. Borinquen Apts.
15. Brisas de San Alfonso
16. Brisas del Parque
17. Brisas del Parque II
18. Brisas del Turabo
19. Brooklyn
20. Brooklyn- Urb. Jiménez Rosa
21. Bunker
22. C3TEC
23. Caguas Courtyard
24. Caguas Norte
25. Cementerio Municipal 1
26. Central AEE
27. Community Shopping Ctr.
28. Cond. El Verde
29. Cond. Torre de Tokio
30. Condado
31. Condado Moderno
32. Consolidated Mall
33. Correo Sur
34. Ctro. de Bellas Artes
35. Ctro. de Gob. Municipal
36. Ctro. de Gob.Estatal
37. Ctro. Judicial
38. Cuartel de Distrito Estatal
39. Delgado
40. E. González
41. Egida el Buen Samaritano
42. El Campito
43. El Pueblo
44. El Verde
45. El Verde Sur
46. Emp. Masso
47. Esc. Libre de Música
48. Estadio I. Solá Morales
49. Estancias del Verde
50. Ext. Ave. Degetau
51. Ext. El Verde
52. Ext. La Granja
53. Gatsby
54. Guardia Nacional
55. Huertas Junior College
56. Jardines de Caguas
57. Jardines Plá
58. Jom Apts.
59. La Granja
60. La Industria
61. Las Catalinas Mall
62. Los Flamboyanes 3
63. Machín
64. Monumento L.M.Marín
65. Myrlena
66. Nazario
67. Notre Dame
68. Notre Dame Plaza
69. Nueva Comandacia Policía Estatal
70. Nuevo Centro Judicial
71. Paradis
72. Parque Industrial Caguax
73. Parque Industrial Villa Blanca
74. Parque J.E. Monagas
75. Paseo El Verde
76. Paseo Gautier Benítez
77. Paseo Las Catalinas
78. Plaza Angora
79. Plaza Cagüitas
80. Plaza del Mercado
81. Plaza Gautier Benítez
82. Plaza Palmer
83. Plaza San Alfonso
84. Portales Reales
85. Quiñones
86. Reparto Aldrich
87. Res. Castellón
88. Res. Jiménez García
89. Reserva Federal
90. San Alfonso
91. San Antonio
92. San Marcos
93. Santo Domingo
94. Savarona
95. Senderos del Roble
96. Terminal Pancho Pereira
97. Terralinda
98. Vía Ducto
99. Villa Blanca
100. Villa Blanca Plaza
101. Villa Flores

=== Turabo ===
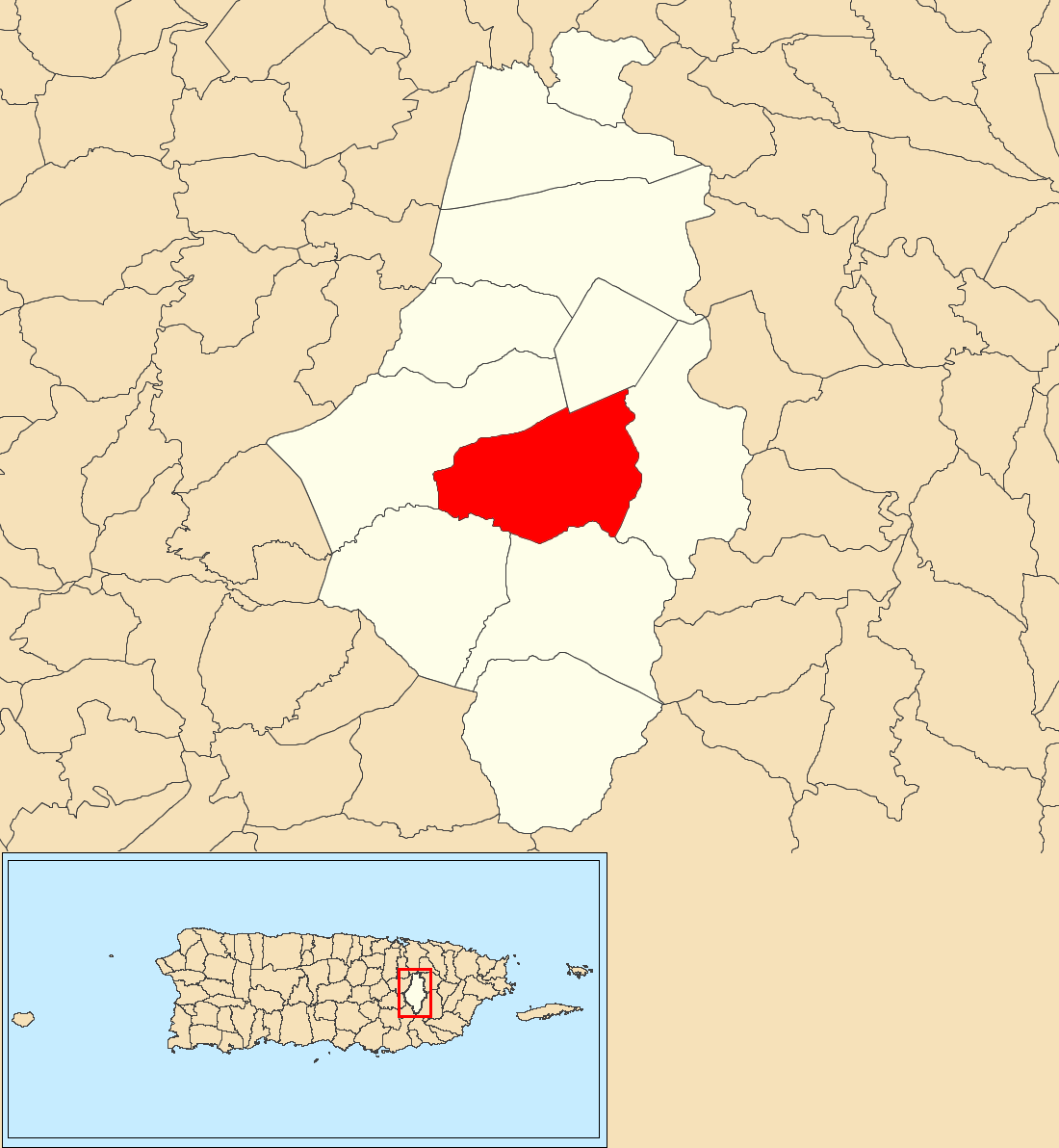
Barrio Turabo in Caguas

1. Altos de la Fuente
2. Apts. Vistas del Turabo
3. Bo. Turabo
4. Bosque Verde
5. Caguas Real
6. Caguas Real - Mansiones del Golf
7. Caguas Real - Villas del Golf
8. Ctro. Comercial Villa Carmen
9. El Ramal
10. El Ramal - Los Berrios
11. El Ramal - Los Soto
12. El Ramal (Loma Linda)
13. Estancias del Rey
14. Hacienda Ramonita
15. Haciendas del Rey
16. Hosp. HIMA
17. Hotel Sheraton
18. La Macanea
19. La Macanea - Los Solá
20. Los Flamboyanes 1
21. Los Flamboyanes 2
22. Mansiones del Paraíso
23. Mariolga
24. Plaza del Carmen Mall
25. Res. Gautier Benítez
26. Res. Kennedy
27. Res. San Carlos
28. Río Turab
29. Turabo Abajo
30. Turabo Arriba
31. Turabo Arriba - Santa María I
32. Villa Cáliz I
33. Villa Carmen
34. Villa del Rey 1ra Sec.
35. Villa del Rey 2da Sec.
36. Villa del Rey 3ra Sec.
37. Villa Esperanza
38. Villa Nueva
39. Villas del Río Verde
40. Vistas del Valle

=== Bairoa ===
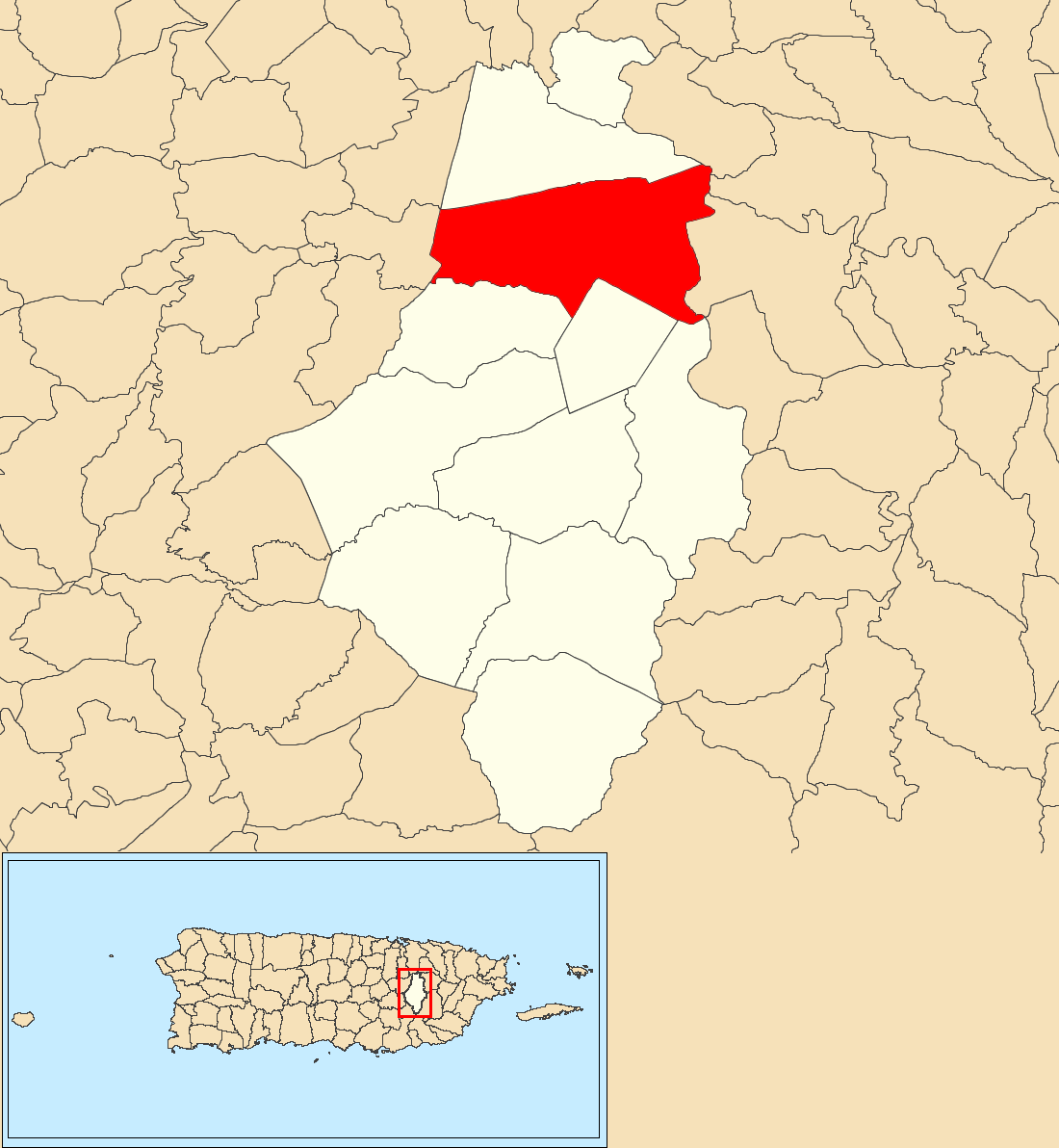
Barrio Bairoa in Caguas

1. Alto Monte
2. Altos de San Luis
3. Antigua Planta de Tratamiento
4. Antigua Via
5. Apts. Los Pinos
6. Arbolada
7. Bairoa I
8. Bairoa II
9. Bairoa La 25
10. Bairoa Park
11. Bairoa Shopping Center
12. Bo. Bairoa
13. Caguas Milenio I
14. Caguas Milenio II
15. Caribbean Containers
16. Cementerio Monte Calvario
17. Chalets de
18. Ciudad Jardín
19. Ciudad Jardín - La Cima
20. Colinas de
21. Ctro. Comercial San Antonio
22. Diamond Village
23. El Retiro
24. Estancias de
25. Estancias de Santa Teresa
26. Estancias del Turabo
27. Golden Gate I
28. Golden Gate II
29. Jardines de Condado Moderno
30. La Serranía
31. La Serranía - Lomas de La Serranía
32. La Serranía - Ricón de La Serranía
33. Las Carolinas
34. Las Carolinas - Urb. Las Carolinas
35. Los Cajones
36. Los Curas
37. Los Reyes
38. Mansiones de
39. Mirador de
40. Monte Altos de San Luis
41. Monticelo
42. Obras Públicas Mun.
43. Parque Industrial Angora
44. Parque Industrial
45. Parque Industrial Santa Elvira
46. Planta de Tratamiento La 25
47. Plaza Centro
48. Santa Juana Apts.
49. Santa Juana I y II
50. Santa Juana III
51. Santa Juana IV
52. Telefónica
53. Valle Verde
54. Valley View Park
55. Villa Blanca Apts.
56. Walmart
57. Wind Gate

== See also ==
- List of communities in Puerto Rico

== Internet Links ==
- Official Caguas sector subdivision maps
- Desglose de Sectores
