= Puerto Rico Highway 176 =

Highway in Puerto Rico

Highway 176
- Ruta 176

Route information
- Maintained by Puerto Rico DTPW
- Length: 11.7 km (7.3 mi)
- Existed: 1953–present

Major junctions
- South end: PR-175 in Carraízo
- PR-843 in Carraízo; PR-199 in Cupey; PR-8176 in Cupey; PR-177 in Cupey; PR-8176 in Cupey; PR-845 in Cupey; PR-8838 in El Cinco
- North end: PR-1 / PR-21 in El Cinco

Location
- Country: United States
- Territory: Puerto Rico
- Municipalities: Trujillo Alto, San Juan

Highway system
- Roads in Puerto Rico; List
← PR-175	→ PR-177
← PR-7760	PR-8176	→ PR-8177

Puerto Rico Highway 176 (PR-176) is a main road in Cupey. It begins at its intersection with PR-175 near Carraízo Lake in Trujillo Alto and ends at PR-1 near downtown Río Piedras.

Puerto Rico Highway 176 by municipality

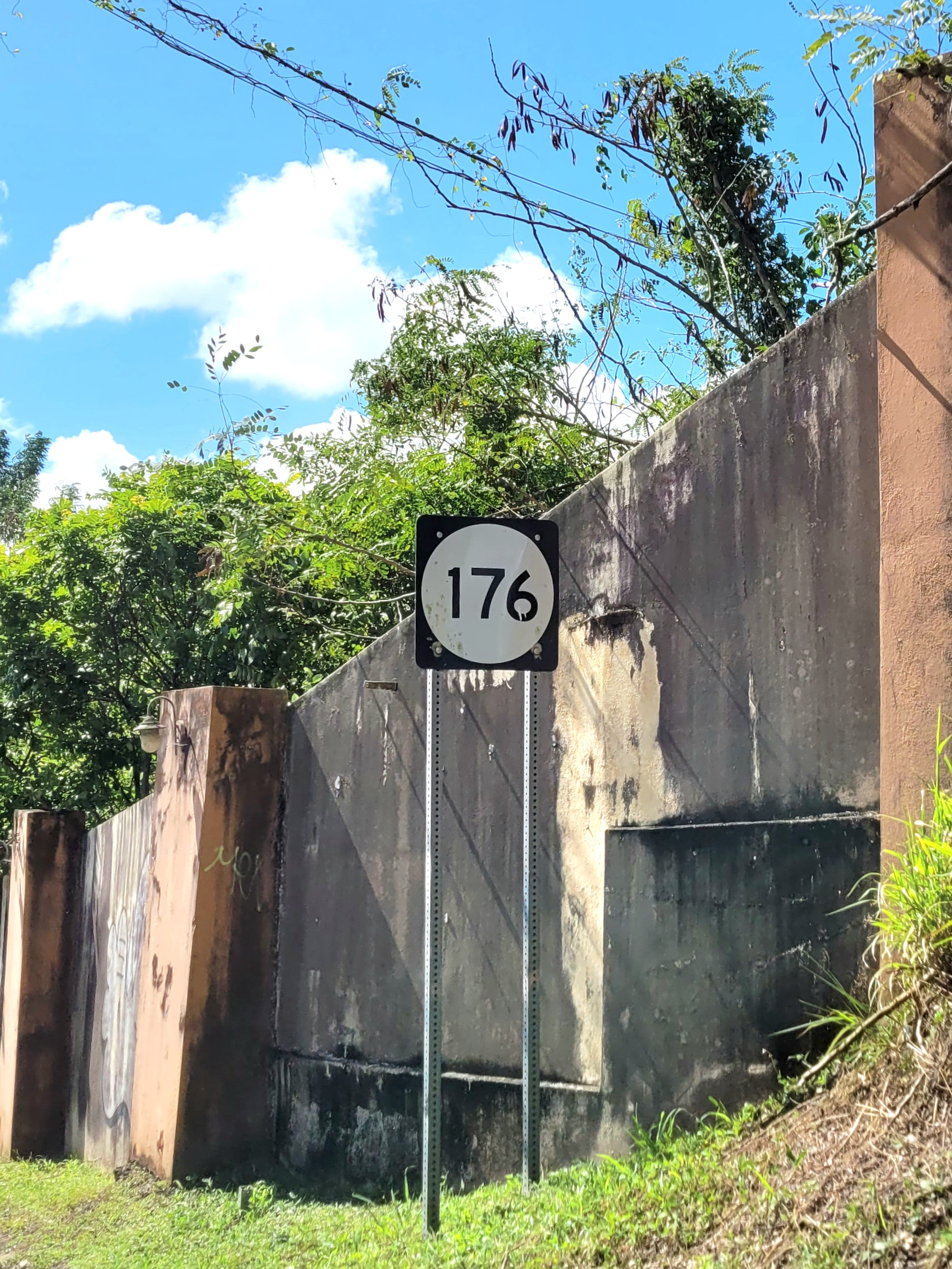
Southbound sign in Carraízo, Trujillo Alto

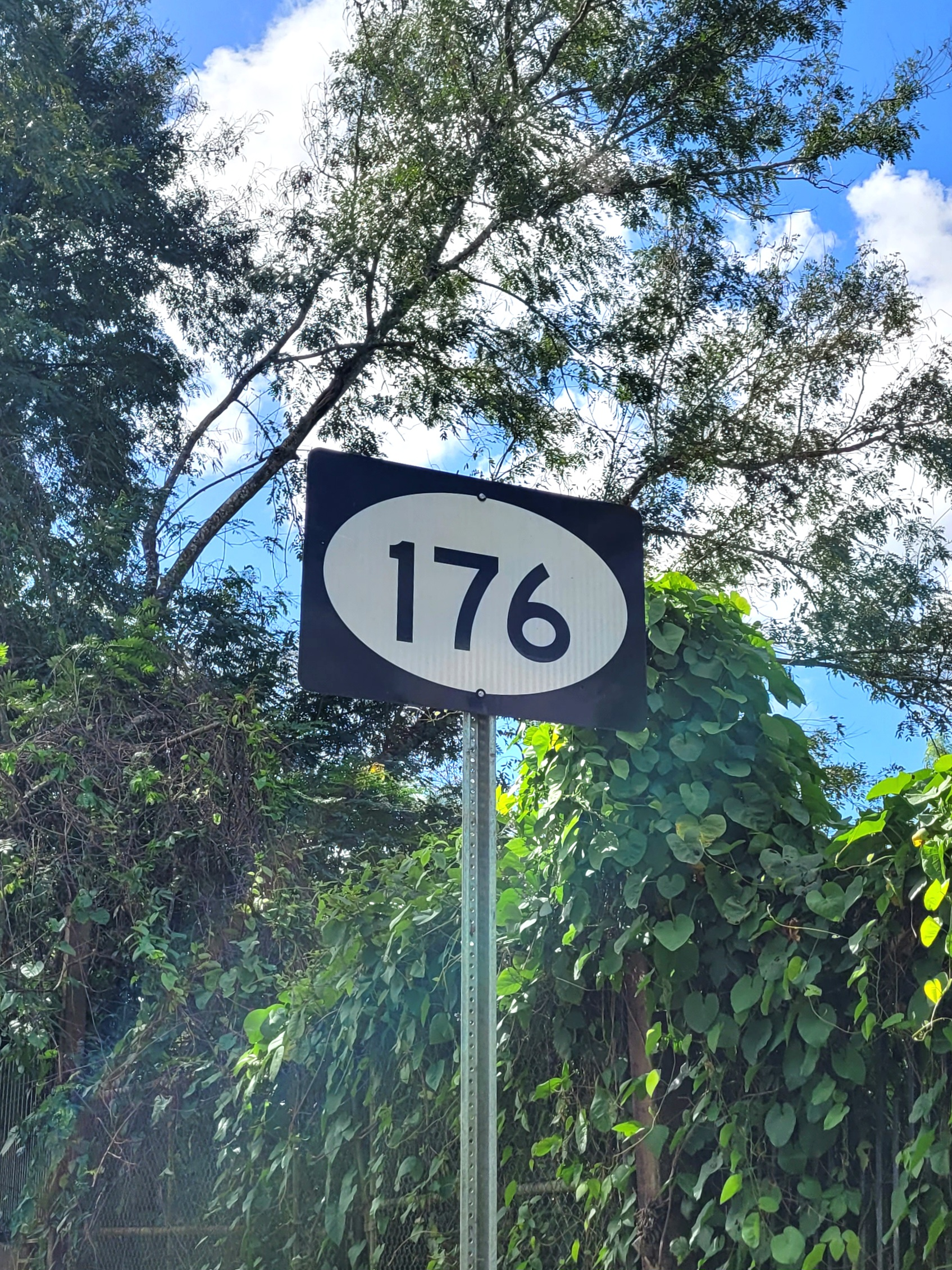
Southbound sign in Cupey, San Juan

== Major intersections ==
Municipality	Location	km	mi	Destinations	Notes
Trujillo Alto	Carraízo	11.7	7.3	PR-175 – Trujillo Alto, Caguas	Southern terminus of PR-176
Trujillo Alto	Carraízo	11.5	7.1	PR-843 – Carraízo	
San Juan	Cupey	4.1– 4.0	2.5– 2.5	PR-199 (Avenida Doña Felisa Rincón de Gautier) – Guaynabo, Trujillo Alto	
San Juan	Cupey	3.7	2.3	PR-Avenida Cupey Gardens / PR-Avenida Winston Churchill – Cupey	
San Juan	Cupey	3.4	2.1	PR-8176 (Calle Santa Águeda) – Cupey	
San Juan	Cupey	2.8	1.7	PR-177 west (Avenida Lomas Verdes) – Guaynabo	
San Juan	Cupey	2.1	1.3	PR-8176 (Calle San Javier) – Cupey	
San Juan	Cupey	1.6	0.99	PR-845 (Avenida San Claudio) – Cupey	
San Juan	El Cinco	0.2	0.12	PR-8838 (Avenida Juan Ponce de León) – El Cinco	
San Juan	El Cinco	0.0	0.0	PR-1 (Carretera Felipe "La Voz" Rodríguez) – Río Piedras, Carolina, Caguas	Northern terminus of PR-176 and eastern terminus of PR-21
San Juan	El Cinco	0.0	0.0	PR-21 west (Avenida Ingeniero José "Kiko" Custodio) – Guaynabo, Bayamón	Continuation beyond PR-1
1.000 mi = 1.609 km; 1.000 km = 0.621 mi

== Related route ==
Highway 8176
- Location: San Juan
- Length: 1.4 km (0.87 mi)

Puerto Rico Highway 8176 (PR-8176) is a road parallel to PR-176 in Cupey. The entire route is located in Cupey, San Juan.

km	mi	Destinations	Notes
0.0	0.0	PR-176 south	Southern terminus of PR-8176; no access to PR-176 north; access to Trujillo Alto, Caguas and Guaynabo
0.7	0.43	PR-177 – San Juan, Río Piedras	Access to Bayamón
1.4	0.87	PR-176	Northern terminus of PR-8176; access to Río Piedras
1.000 mi = 1.609 km; 1.000 km = 0.621 mi: Incomplete access

== See also ==
- 1953 Puerto Rico highway renumbering
