= Cerro Gordo, Bayamón, Puerto Rico =

Barrio of Puerto Rico

Cerro Gordo
- Barrio
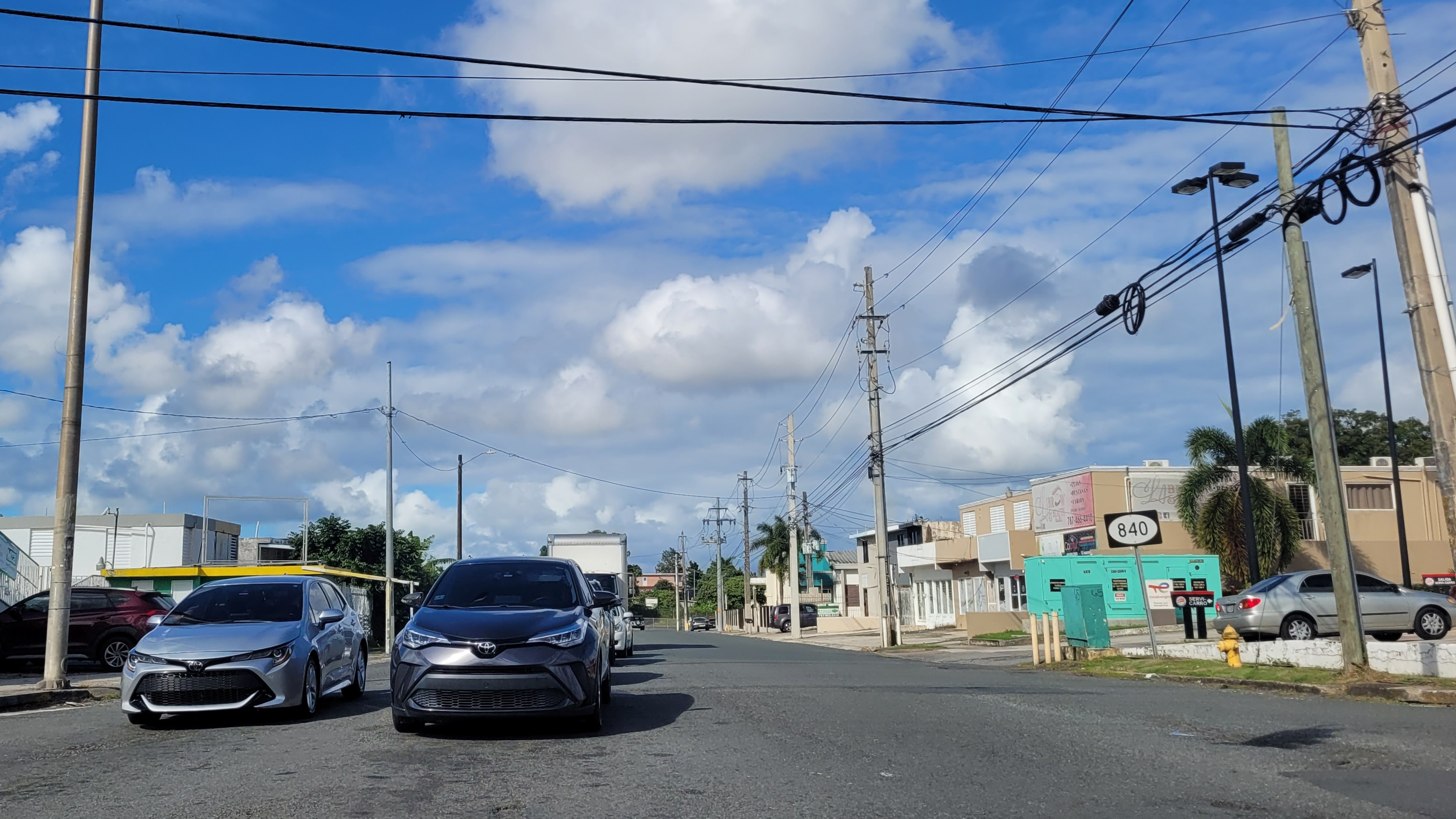
- Puerto Rico Highway 840 in Cerro Gordo

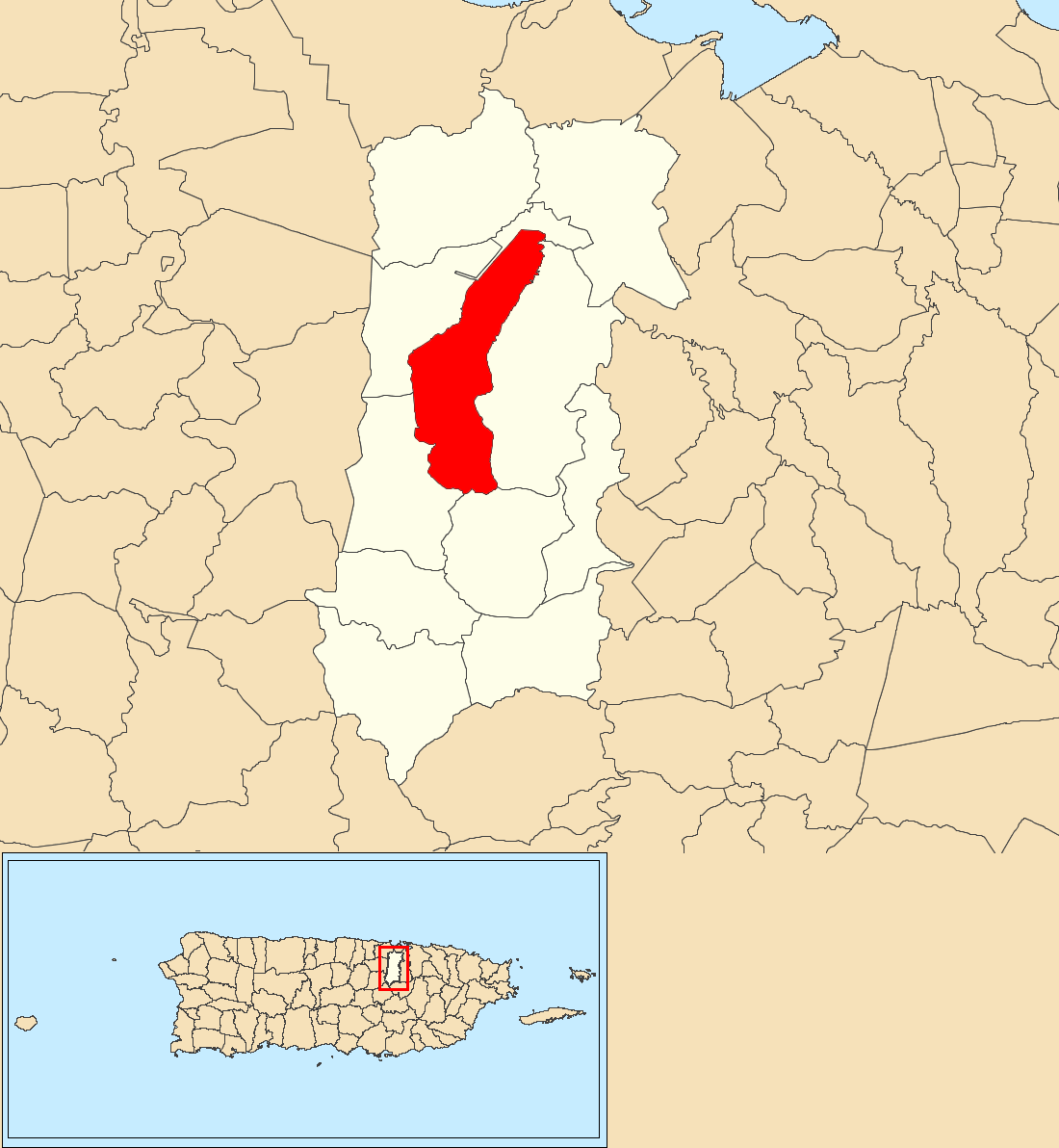
- Location of Cerro Gordo within the municipality of Bayamón shown in red

- Location of Puerto Rico
- Coordinates: 18°21′42″N 66°10′23″W
- Commonwealth: Puerto Rico
- Municipality: Bayamón

Area
  - Total: 4.31 sq mi (11.2 km^{2})
  - Land: 4.31 sq mi (11.2 km^{2})
  - Water: 0.00 sq mi (0 km^{2})
- Elevation: 128 ft (39 m)

Population (2010)
  - Total: 31,508
  - Density: 3,124.1/sq mi (1,206.2/km^{2})
- Source: 2010 Census
- Time zone: UTC−4 (AST)

Cerro Gordo is a barrio in the municipality of Bayamón, Puerto Rico. Its population in 2010 was 31,508.

== History ==
Cerro Gordo was in Spain's gazetteers until Puerto Rico was ceded by Spain in the aftermath of the Spanish–American War under the terms of the Treaty of Paris of 1898 and became an unincorporated territory of the United States. In 1899, the United States Department of War conducted a census of Puerto Rico finding that the population of Cerro Gordo barrio was 845.

Historical population
Census	Pop.	Note	%±
1900	845		—
1910	1,081		27.9%
1920	964		−10.8%
1930	1,339		38.9%
1940	1,591		18.8%
1950	3,441		116.3%
1960	11,084		222.1%
1970	0		−100.0%
1980	31,399		—
1990	34,510		9.9%
2000	34,161		−1.0%
2010	31,508		−7.8%
U.S. Decennial Census; 1899 (shown as 1900) 1910-1930; 1930-1950 1980-2000 2010

== See also ==
- List of communities in Puerto Rico
