= San Antonio, Caguas, Puerto Rico =

Barrio of Puerto Rico

San Antonio
- Barrio
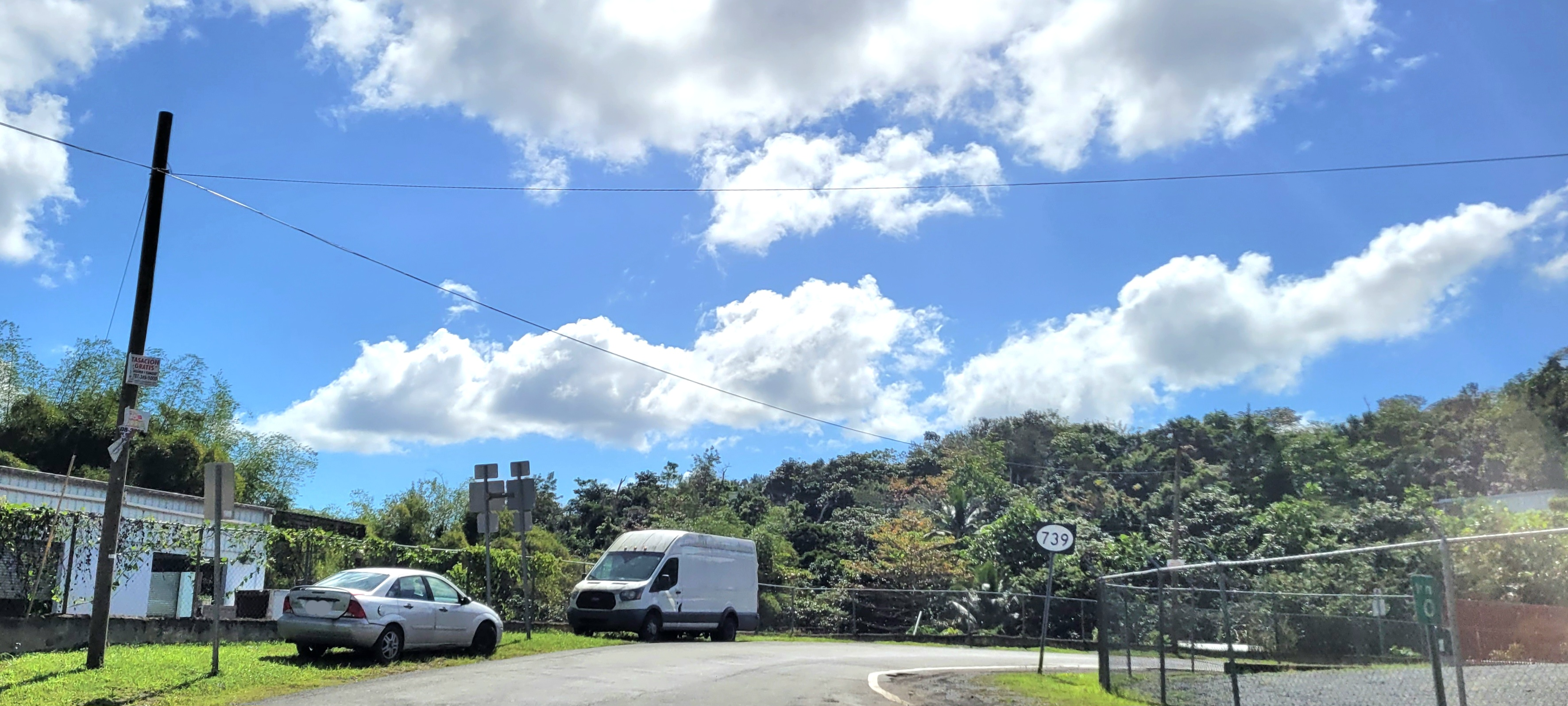
- Puerto Rico Highway 739 in San Antonio

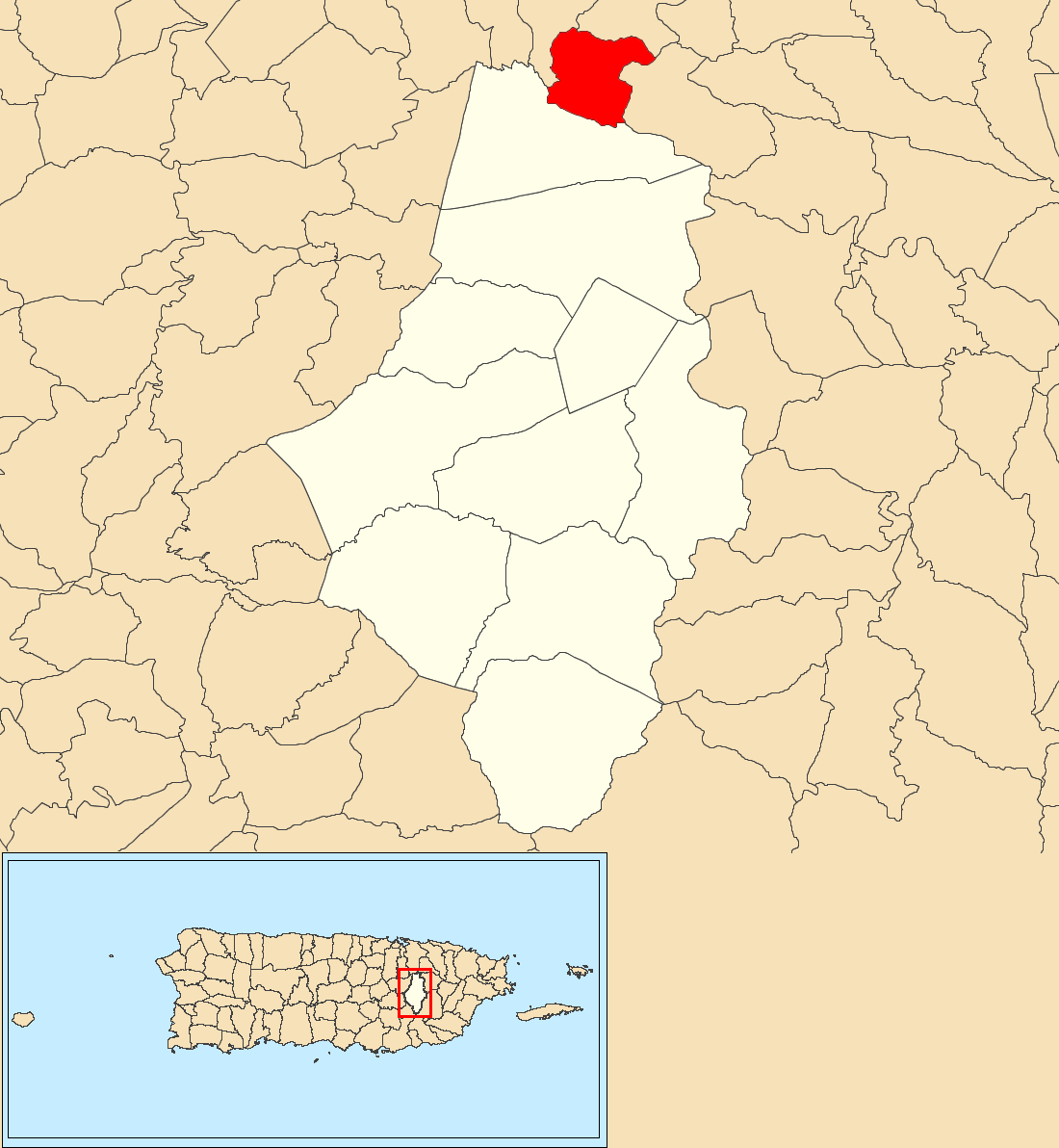
- Location of San Antonio within the municipality of Caguas shown in red

- Location of Puerto Rico
- Coordinates: 18°18′05″N 66°02′11″W
- Commonwealth: Puerto Rico
- Municipality: Caguas

Area
  - Total: 1.84 sq mi (4.8 km^{2})
  - Land: 1.67 sq mi (4.3 km^{2})
  - Water: 0.17 sq mi (0.44 km^{2})
- Elevation: 161 ft (49 m)

Population (2010)
  - Total: 2,224
  - Density: 1,331.7/sq mi (514.2/km^{2})
- Source: 2010 Census
- Time zone: UTC−4 (AST)
- ZIP Code: 00725, 00726, 00727
- Area codes: 787, 939

San Antonio is a barrio in the municipality of Caguas, Puerto Rico. Its population in 2010 was 2,224.

== History ==
San Antonio was in Spain's gazetteers until Puerto Rico was ceded by Spain in the aftermath of the Spanish–American War under the terms of the Treaty of Paris of 1898 and became an unincorporated territory of the United States. In 1899, the United States Department of War conducted a census of Puerto Rico finding that the population of San Antonio barrio was 887.

Historical population
Census	Pop.	Note	%±
1900	887		—
1910	735		−17.1%
1920	770		4.8%
1930	1,010		31.2%
1940	1,103		9.2%
1950	974		−11.7%
1960	1,281		31.5%
1970	1,719		34.2%
1980	1,639		−4.7%
1990	2,149		31.1%
2000	2,395		11.4%
2010	2,224		−7.1%
U.S. Decennial Census; 1899 (shown as 1900) 1910-1930; 1930-1950 1980-2000 2010

A landslide occurred in January 2024 in San Antonio.

In 2017, Barrio San Antonio accounted for only 2 of the 146 permits approved for construction in Caguas.

== Sectors ==
The following sectors are in San Antonio, Caguas:

- Buena Vista
- Las Penas
- Cuatro Calles
- El Faro
- José A Díaz
- La Cuchilla
- Los Matress/Las Carmelitas
- Los Pinos
- Monte Lago

== Gallery ==
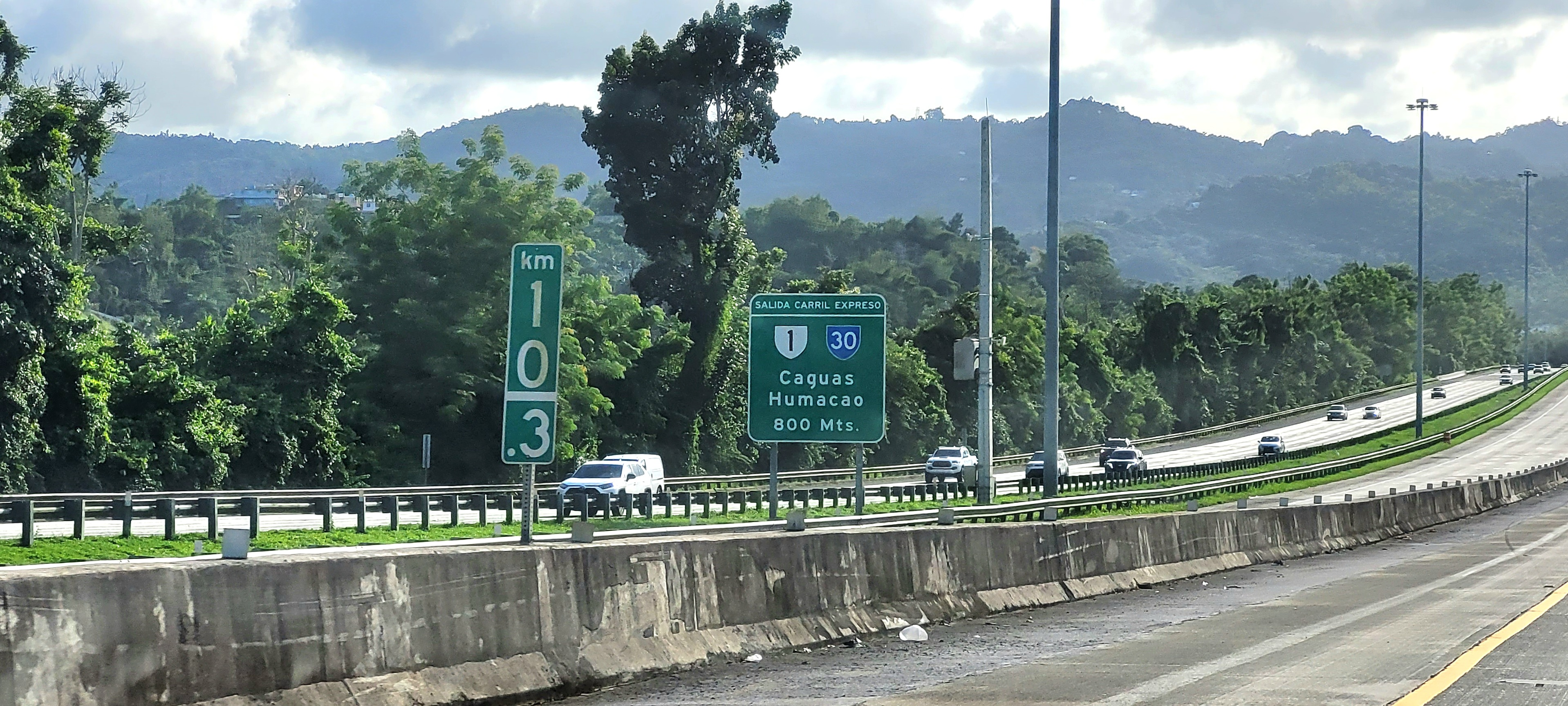
Puerto Rico Highway 52 in San Antonio

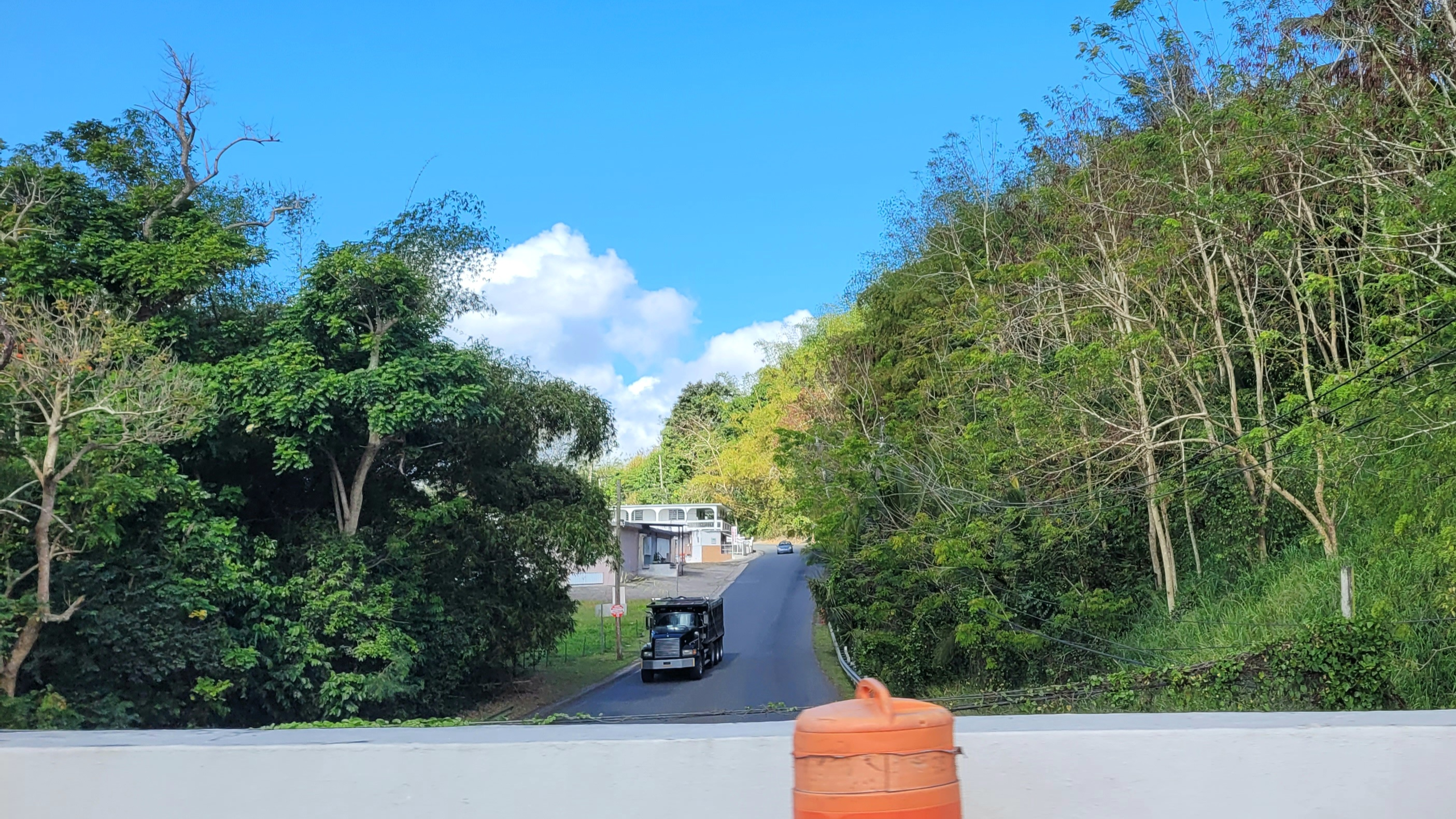
Puerto Rico Highway 175 from Puerto Rico Highway 52 in San Antonio

== See also ==
- List of communities in Puerto Rico
