= St. Just, Trujillo Alto, Puerto Rico =

Barrio of Puerto Rico

St. Just
- Barrio
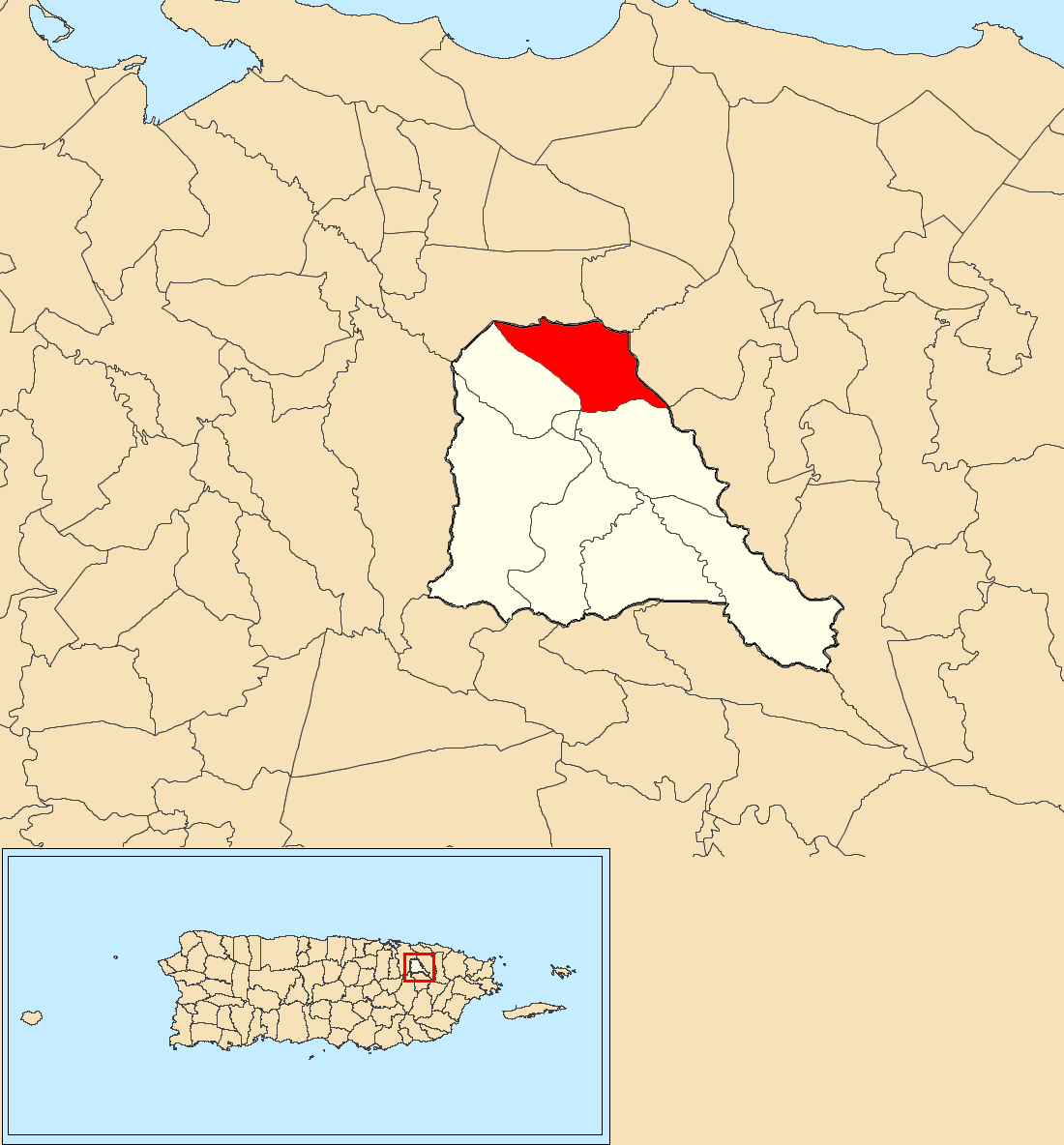
- Location of St. Just within the municipality of Trujillo Alto shown in red

- Location of Puerto Rico
- Coordinates: 18°22′13″N 66°00′09″W
- Commonwealth: Puerto Rico
- Municipality: Trujillo Alto
- Founded: 1990

Area
  - Total: 2.26 sq mi (5.9 km^{2})
  - Land: 2.23 sq mi (5.8 km^{2})
  - Water: 0.03 sq mi (0.078 km^{2})
- Elevation: 125 ft (38 m)

Population (2010)
  - Total: 14,635
  - Density: 6,592.3/sq mi (2,545.3/km^{2})
- Source: 2010 Census
- Time zone: UTC−4 (AST)

St. Just is a barrio in the municipality of Trujillo Alto, Puerto Rico. A newer barrio, its population is counted starting with the 2000 Census, and in 2010 was 14,635.

Historical population
Census	Pop.	Note	%±
2000	12,572		—
2010	14,635		16.4%
U.S. Decennial Census; 2000 2010

A newer barrio of Trujillo Alto, it was established in 1990. The barrio is named after an Infantry Captain of the Spanish army, Federico Saint Just, who in 1818 and by royal decree was granted a large swath of land belonging to barrio Cuevas in Trujillo Alto.

== See also ==
- List of communities in Puerto Rico
