= Cuevas, Trujillo Alto, Puerto Rico =

Barrio of Puerto Rico

Cuevas
- Barrio
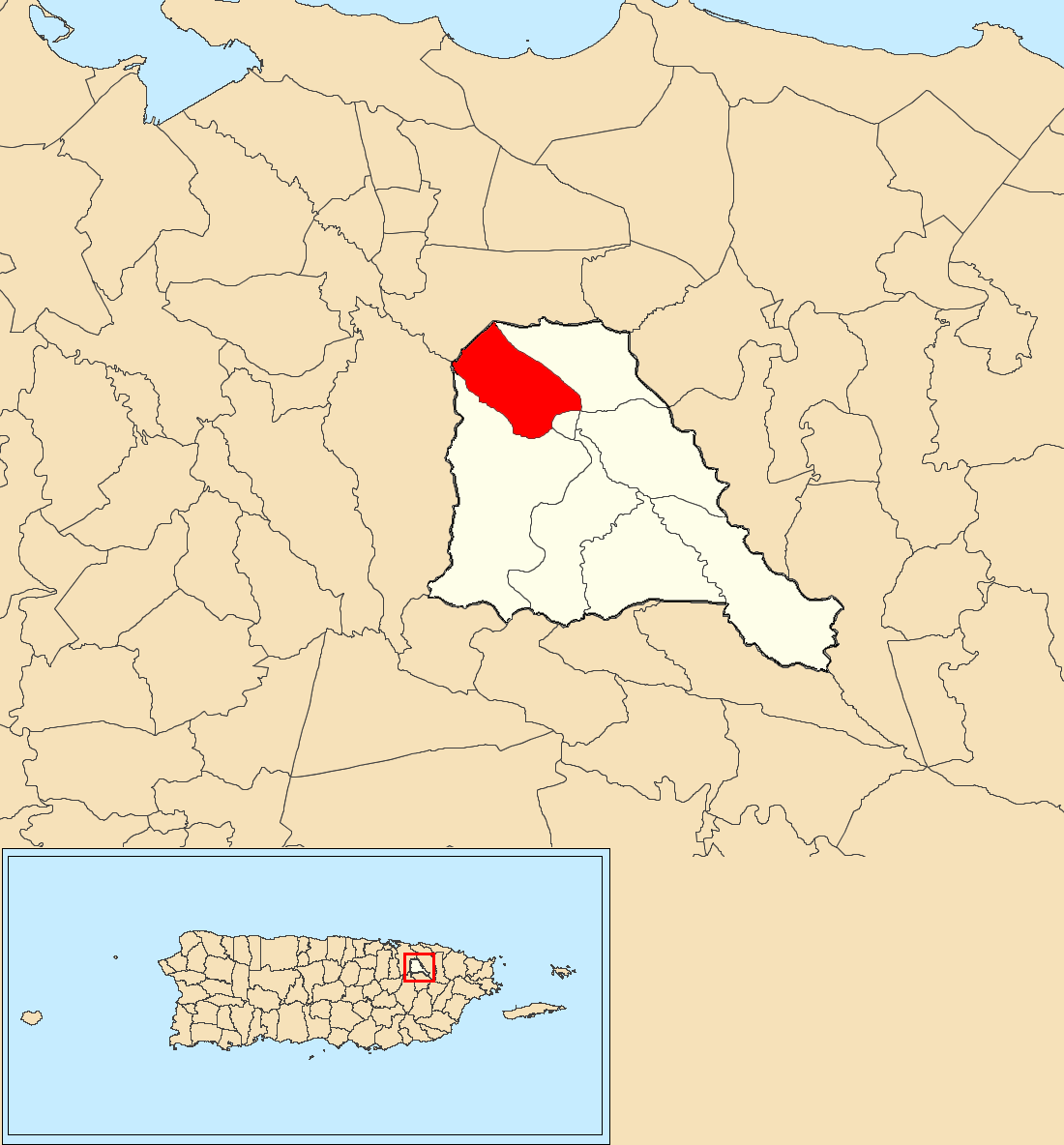
- Location of Cuevas within the municipality of Trujillo Alto shown in red

- Location of Puerto Rico
- Coordinates: 18°21′51″N 66°01′08″W
- Commonwealth: Puerto Rico
- Municipality: Trujillo Alto

Area
  - Total: 2.02 sq mi (5.2 km^{2})
  - Land: 2.01 sq mi (5.2 km^{2})
  - Water: 0.01 sq mi (0.026 km^{2})
- Elevation: 292 ft (89 m)

Population (2010)
  - Total: 19,852
  - Density: 9,827.7/sq mi (3,794.5/km^{2})
- Source: 2010 Census
- Time zone: UTC−4 (AST)

Cuevas is a barrio in the municipality of Trujillo Alto, Puerto Rico. Its population in 2010 was 19,852.

== History ==
Cuevas was in Spain's gazetteers until Puerto Rico was ceded by Spain in the aftermath of the Spanish–American War under the terms of the Treaty of Paris of 1898 and became an unincorporated territory of the United States. In 1899, the United States Department of War conducted a census of Puerto Rico finding that the population of Cuevas barrio was 688.

Historical population
Census	Pop.	Note	%±
1900	688		—
1910	1,101		60.0%
1920	1,463		32.9%
1930	2,550		74.3%
1940	3,703		45.2%
1950	4,848		30.9%
1960	7,801		60.9%
1970	0		−100.0%
1980	30,347		—
1990	30,597		0.8%
2000	22,101		−27.8%
2010	19,852		−10.2%
U.S. Decennial Census; 1899 (shown as 1900) 1910-1930; 1930-1950 1980-2000 2010

== Features ==
In 1952, along with the Carraízo Dam constructed in barrio Carraízo, a filtration plant was constructed in barrio Cuevas.

There is a Banco Popular in Cuevas.

== Notable people ==
- Ángel Rivero Méndez, Puerto Rican soldier, journalist and businessman

== See also ==
- List of communities in Puerto Rico
