= Autoroute 20 =

Autoroute 20 may refer to:

- A20 autoroute, in France
- Quebec Autoroute 20, in Quebec, Canada

== See also ==
- List of A20 roads
- List of highways numbered 20
