= Puerto Rico Highway 20 =

Highway in Puerto Rico

Highway 20
- Ruta 20
- Expreso Rafael Martínez Nadal

Route information
- Maintained by Metropistas
- Length: 9.5 km (5.9 mi)

Major junctions
- South end: PR-1 in Río
- PR-169 in Río; PR-199 in Guaynabo barrio-pueblo; PR-177 in Frailes; PR-21 in Monacillo Urbano–Gobernador Piñero; PR-17 in Gobernador Piñero
- North end: PR-2 in Pueblo Viejo

Location
- Country: United States
- Territory: Puerto Rico
- Municipalities: Guaynabo, San Juan

Highway system
- Roads in Puerto Rico; List
← PR-19	→ PR-21

Puerto Rico Highway 20 (PR-20) or Expreso Rafael Martínez Nadal is a short tollway located between the municipalities of Guaynabo and San Juan in Puerto Rico. With a length of 9.5 km (5.9 mi), it begins at PR-2 interchange in Pueblo Viejo barrio and ends at PR-1 junction in Río barrio.

== Route description ==
It used to be divided highway with traffic signals, which even turned into a rural road near its south end, but due to the traffic congestion in parallel freeway PR-18, and also in PR-1 and PR-52, it had to be converted and is now 9.5 kilometers long. It has few exits; the first being to PR-169, a road to the rural area of Guaynabo and part of Aguas Buenas; PR-199 which connects it to PR-1 and PR-52; PR-177 which serves Bayamón and Cupey, and PR-17 (Avenida Jesús T. Piñero). It begins in the Muda sector of PR-1 and ends near San Patricio in Caparra, Guaynabo, at PR-2. It is tolled going north from PR-1, but not in the other direction.

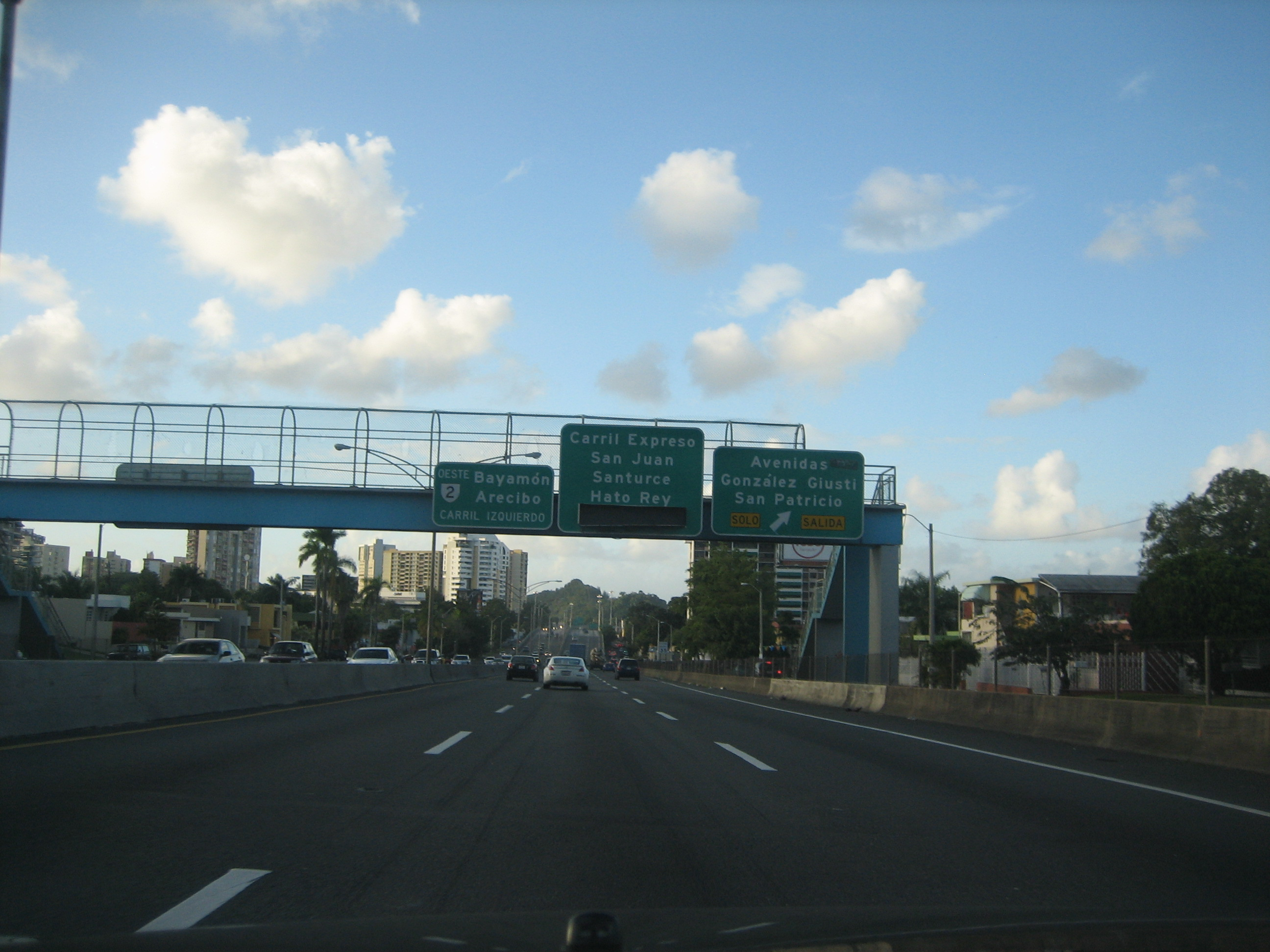
PR-20 near its northern terminus in Guaynabo

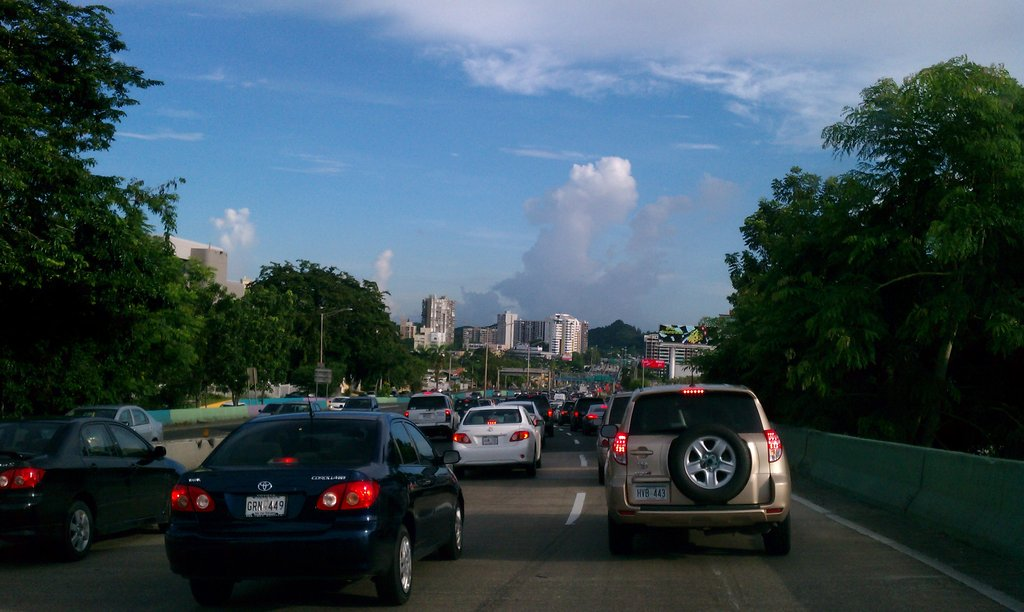
Traffic on Expreso Rafael Martínez Nadal

== Tolls ==
Location	Toll	Direction	AutoExpreso acceptance	AutoExpreso replenishment (R) lane
Guaynabo	$0.60	Two-way		(northbound only)

== Exit list ==
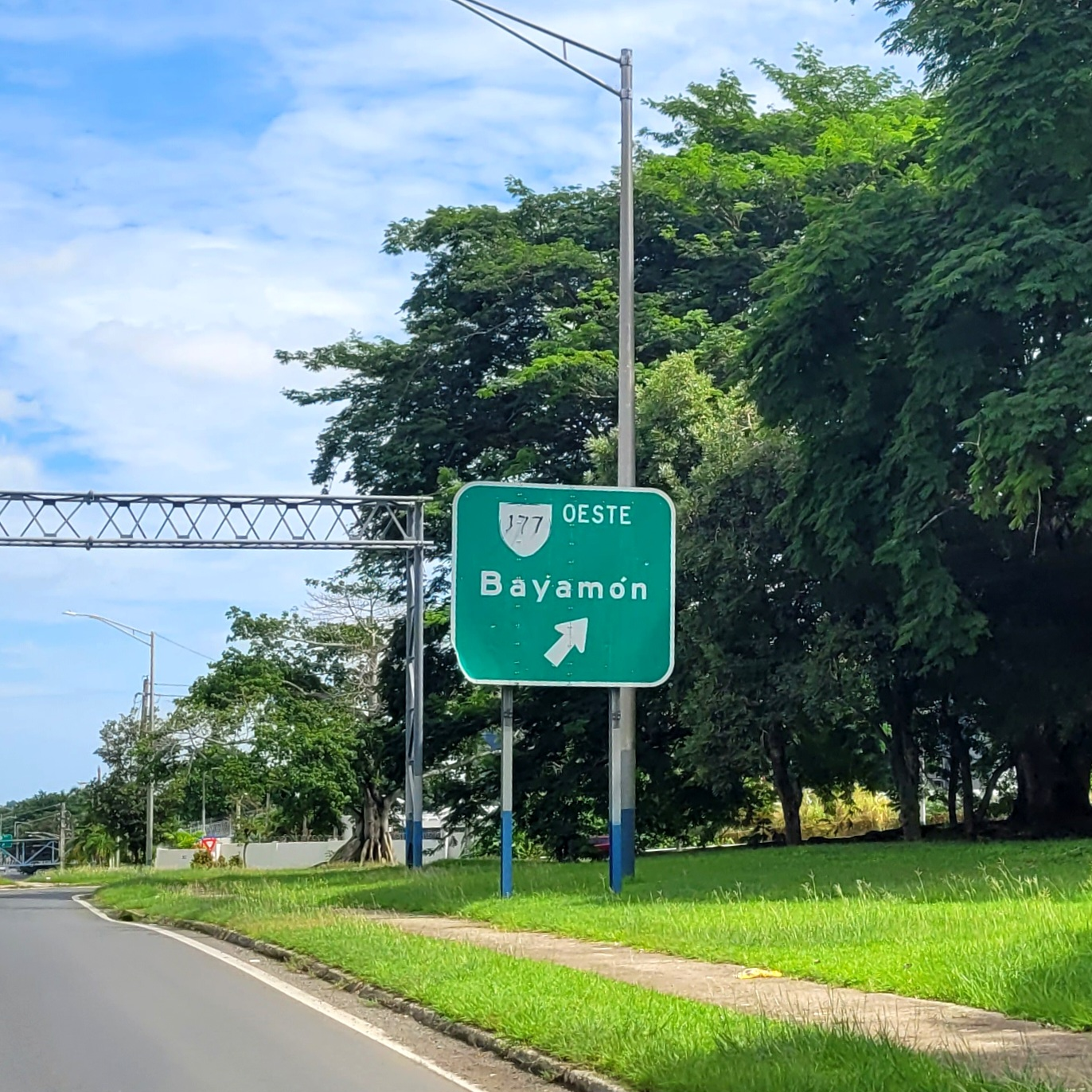
PR-20 north at its exit to PR-177 west in Frailes, Guaynabo

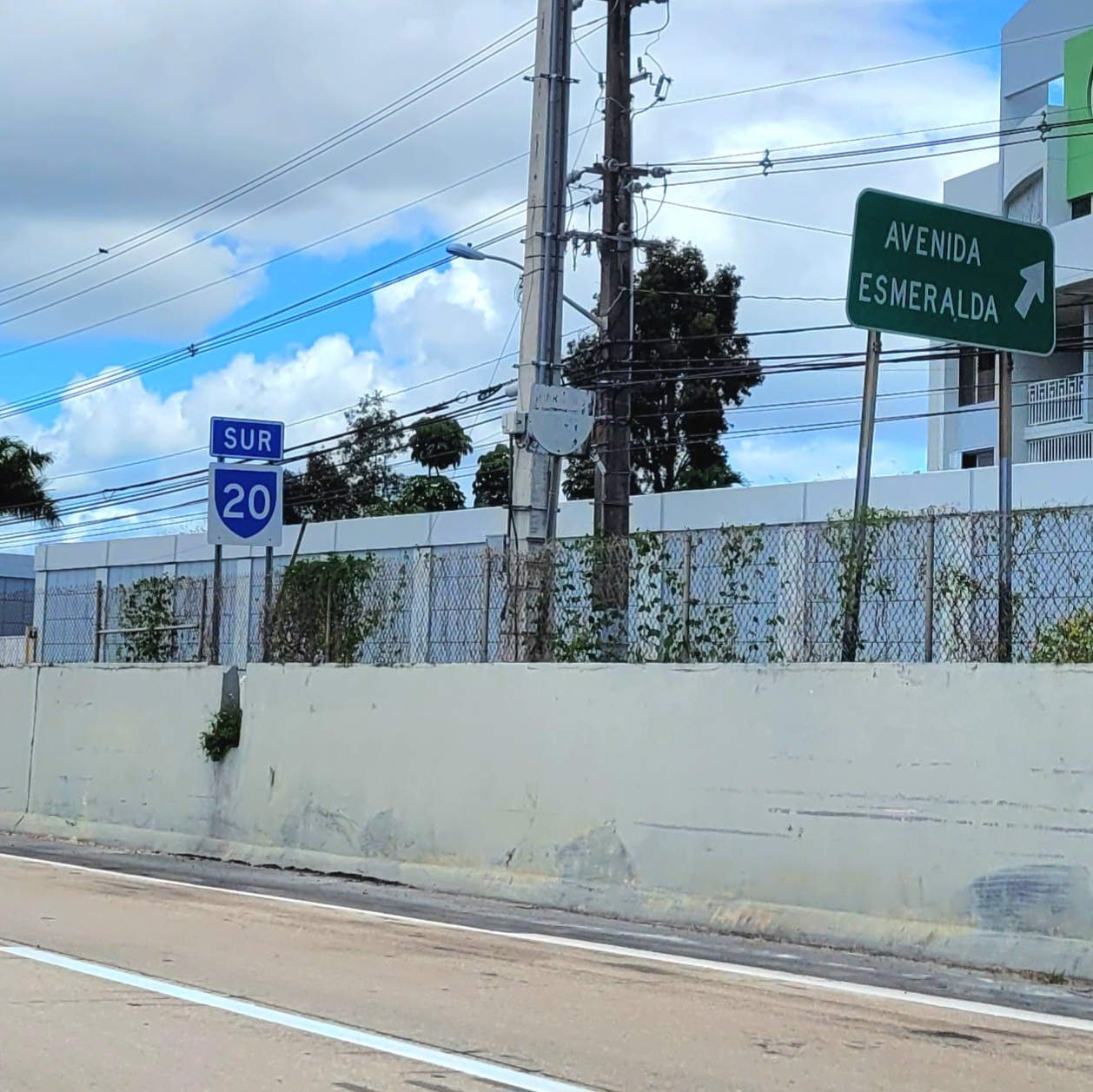
PR-20 south at its exit to Avenida Esmeralda in Frailes, Guaynabo

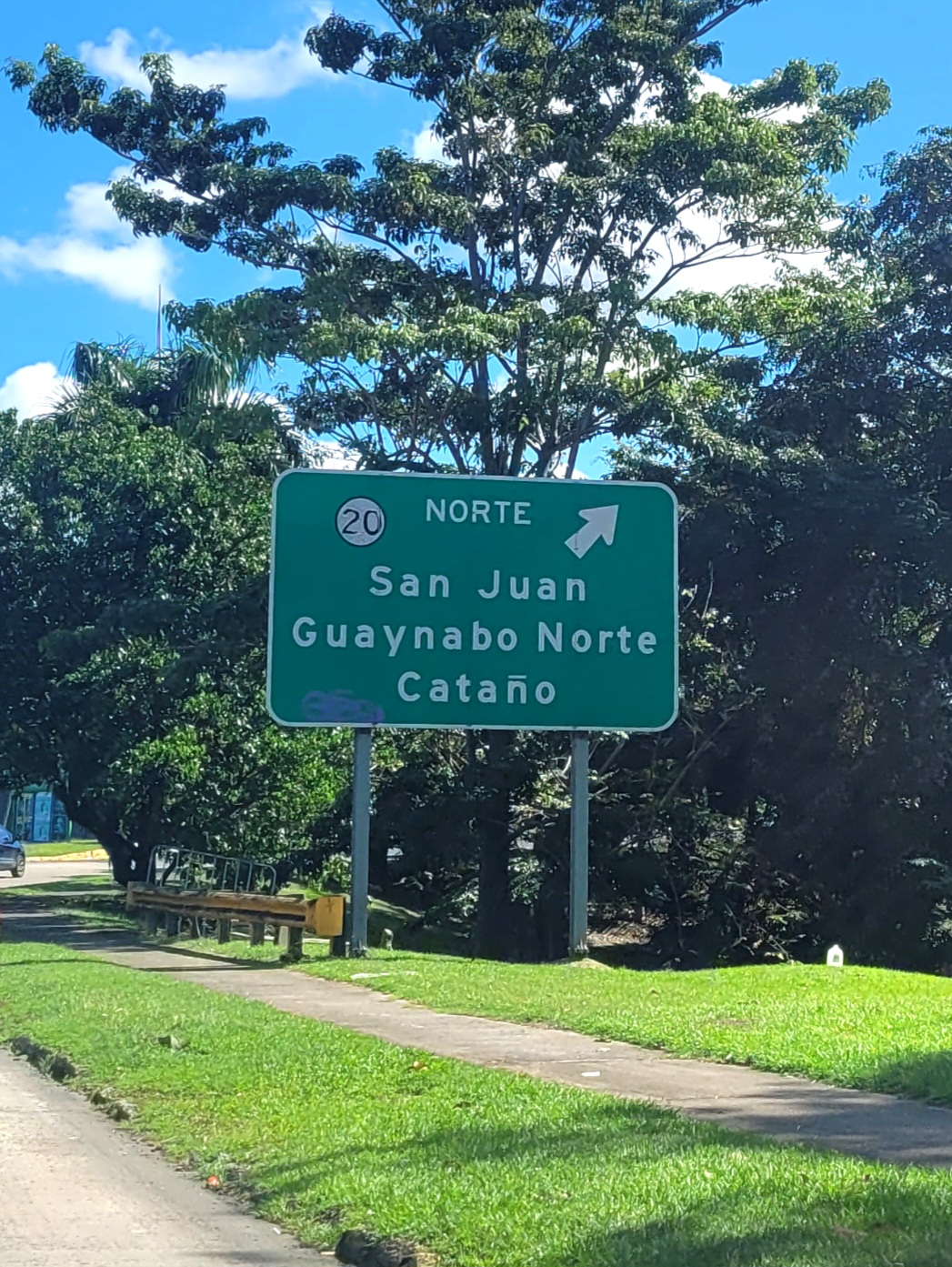
PR-199 east at PR-20 interchange between downtown Guaynabo and Frailes

Municipality	Location	km	mi	Exit	Destinations	Notes
Guaynabo	Río	9.5	5.9	—	PR-1 south (Carretera Felipe "La Voz" Rodríguez) – Caguas	Southern terminus of PR-20
Guaynabo	Río	9.1	5.7	—	PR-169 to PR-1 north (Carretera Felipe "La Voz" Rodríguez) – Río Piedras, La Muda, Camarones, Hato Nuevo	
Guaynabo	Camarones	6.8– 6.7	4.2– 4.2	6	PR-Avenida David Urbina – Guaynabo	
Guaynabo	Frailes–Guaynabo barrio-pueblo line	6.4	4.0	Guaynabo Toll Plaza		
Guaynabo	Guaynabo barrio-pueblo	5.4– 5.3	3.4– 3.3	5	PR-199 (Avenida Las Cumbres) – Guaynabo, Bayamón, Río Piedras, Caguas	
Guaynabo	Frailes	4.2– 4.1	2.6– 2.5	—	PR-Avenida Esmeralda – Guaynabo	
Guaynabo	Frailes	3.1	1.9	—	PR-177 (Avenida Lomas Verdes) – Bayamón, Caguas	
San Juan	Monacillo Urbano–Gobernador Piñero line	2.2	1.4	—	PR-21 (Carretera Roberto Clemente Walker) to PR-19 (Avenida Luis Vigoreaux) – Río Piedras	
San Juan	Gobernador Piñero	1.6	0.99	—	PR-17 (Avenida Jesús T. Piñero) – San Juan, Puerto Nuevo, Río Piedras	
Guaynabo	Pueblo Viejo	0.4	0.25	—	PR-Avenida González Giusti / PR-Avenida San Patricio – Guaynabo	
Guaynabo	Pueblo Viejo	0.0	0.0	4	PR-2 – Bayamón, Arecibo, San Juan, Santurce, Hato Rey, Río Piedras	Northern terminus of PR-20
1.000 mi = 1.609 km; 1.000 km = 0.621 mi: Tolled

== See also ==
- Rafael Martínez Nadal
