= George Floyd protests in Puerto Rico =

2020 civil unrest after the murder of George Floyd

- Part of George Floyd protests
- Date: June 2020
- Location: Puerto Rico
- Caused by: Police brutality; Institutional racism against African Americans and Afro-Puerto Ricans; Reaction to the murder of George Floyd; Economic, racial and social inequality

Puerto Rico has seen a series of George Floyd protests with hundreds of participants marching in demonstrations island-wide.

== Background ==
=== Political ===
On June 3, 2020, San Juan Mayor, Carmen Yulín Cruz, announced that flags would be at half-mast in San Juan for 46 days in honor of George Floyd. Floyd was 46 years old at the time of his murder. Yulín Cruz tweeted "we must stand up against police brutality and racism if we all want to live in peace."

On June 2, 2020, former Governor Aníbal Acevedo Vilá criticized Resident Commissioner Jenniffer González's silence and her ties to Trump. Acevedo Vilá also criticized Trump's reactions to the protests, noting the use of military force in his visit to St. John's Church.

=== Military and law enforcement ===
In response to U.S. President Donald Trump's call for military intervention in the George Floyd protests, Puerto Rico National Guard (PRNG) General, José J. Reyes, stated that the priority of the PRNG is not to control protests in the United States but that they would activate if called to do so. He elaborated that the PRNG is active in efforts to mitigate the COVID-19 pandemic in Puerto Rico and preparing for potential hurricanes.

The San Juan Police Department Chief, José Juan García, stated he did not wish to arrest protesters and said that he wishes to maintain order.

== Demonstrations ==
=== June 1 ===
Hundreds participated in a vigil at El Ancón and Río Grande in Loíza before the 7:00 pm curfew to express solidarity with African Americans.

=== June 2 ===
Protesters assembled in front of La Fortaleza around 5:00 pm. Over 200 protesters violated the 7:00 pm curfew leading police to use pepper spray. Protesters threw motor oil at the police shortly after 7:00 pm. Onlookers observed that the police used plastic shields and assembled in a battle formation known as Fuerzas de choque. The protest in front of La Fortaleza was organized by Colectiva Feminista (CF). CF posted an anti-racist manifesto. Participants called for the end of racism and police brutality in the Commonwealth while blaming local officials for the deaths of black residents. In an effort to prevent the spread of COVID-19, protesters had masks, hand sanitizer and attempted to practice social distancing. The San Juan Police Chief reported that there were no arrests, although 10 officers were injured. The event ended around 8:30 pm.
