= Puerto Rico Highway 17 =

Highway in Puerto Rico

Highway 17
- Ruta 17
- Avenida Jesús T. Piñero

Route information
- Maintained by Metropistas
- Length: 11.5 km (7.1 mi)

Major junctions
- West end: PR-19 in Gobernador Piñero
- PR-20 in Gobernador Piñero; PR-18 in Gobernador Piñero; PR-41 in Hato Rey Sur; PR-1 in Hato Rey Sur; PR-25 in Hato Rey Sur–Universidad; PR-27 in Universidad; PR-181 in Oriente; PR-8 in Oriente
- East end: PR-26 in Cangrejo Arriba

Location
- Country: United States
- Territory: Puerto Rico
- Municipalities: San Juan, Carolina

Highway system
- Roads in Puerto Rico; List
← PR-16	→ PR-18

Puerto Rico Highway 17 (PR-17) is a main highway located in Carolina, San Juan and Guaynabo, Puerto Rico. It begins at PR-20 near its terminus with PR-2, and ends in the Luis Muñoz Marín International Airport in Carolina. It is known as Jesús T. Piñero Avenue along its entire length.

== Route description ==
It intersects several important highways and streets in the metro area, including Las Américas Expressway (PR-18), Juan Ponce de León Avenue (PR-25), Trujillo Alto Expressway (PR-181) and PR-8. After the intersection with PR-181, it becomes a very short freeway and part of it is a toll bridge (the longest bridge above water in the island) called the Teodoro Moscoso Bridge, which is tolled with $3.80. After the bridge, it makes a final intersection with Román Baldorioty de Castro Expressway (PR-26) before becoming the road to the airport.

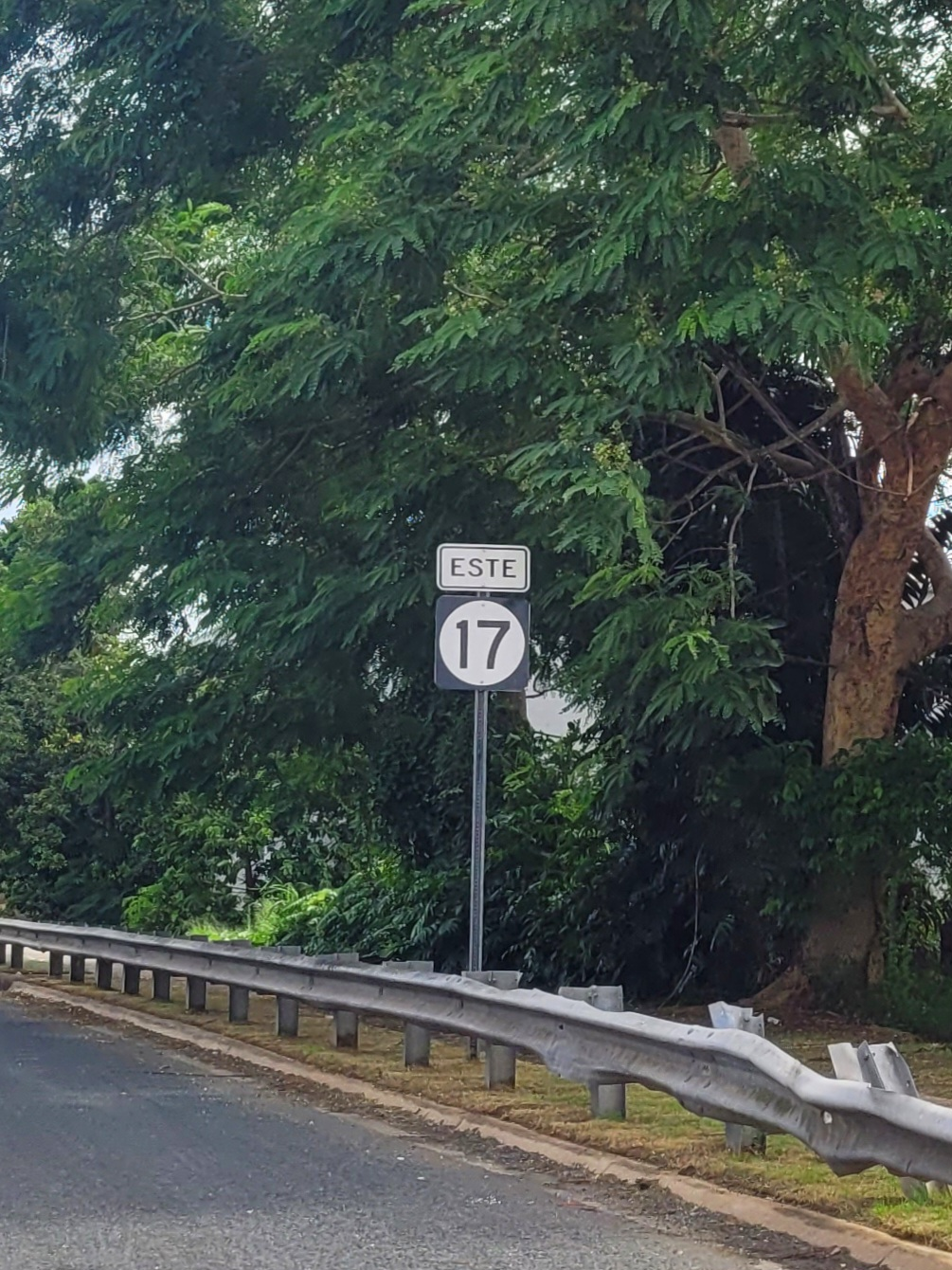
PR-17 east in Gobernador Piñero, San Juan

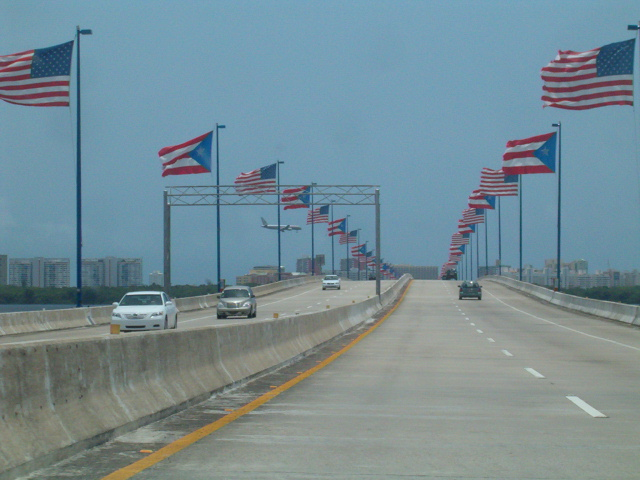
Teodoro Moscoso Bridge (PR-17) connecting San Juan and Isla Verde, Carolina

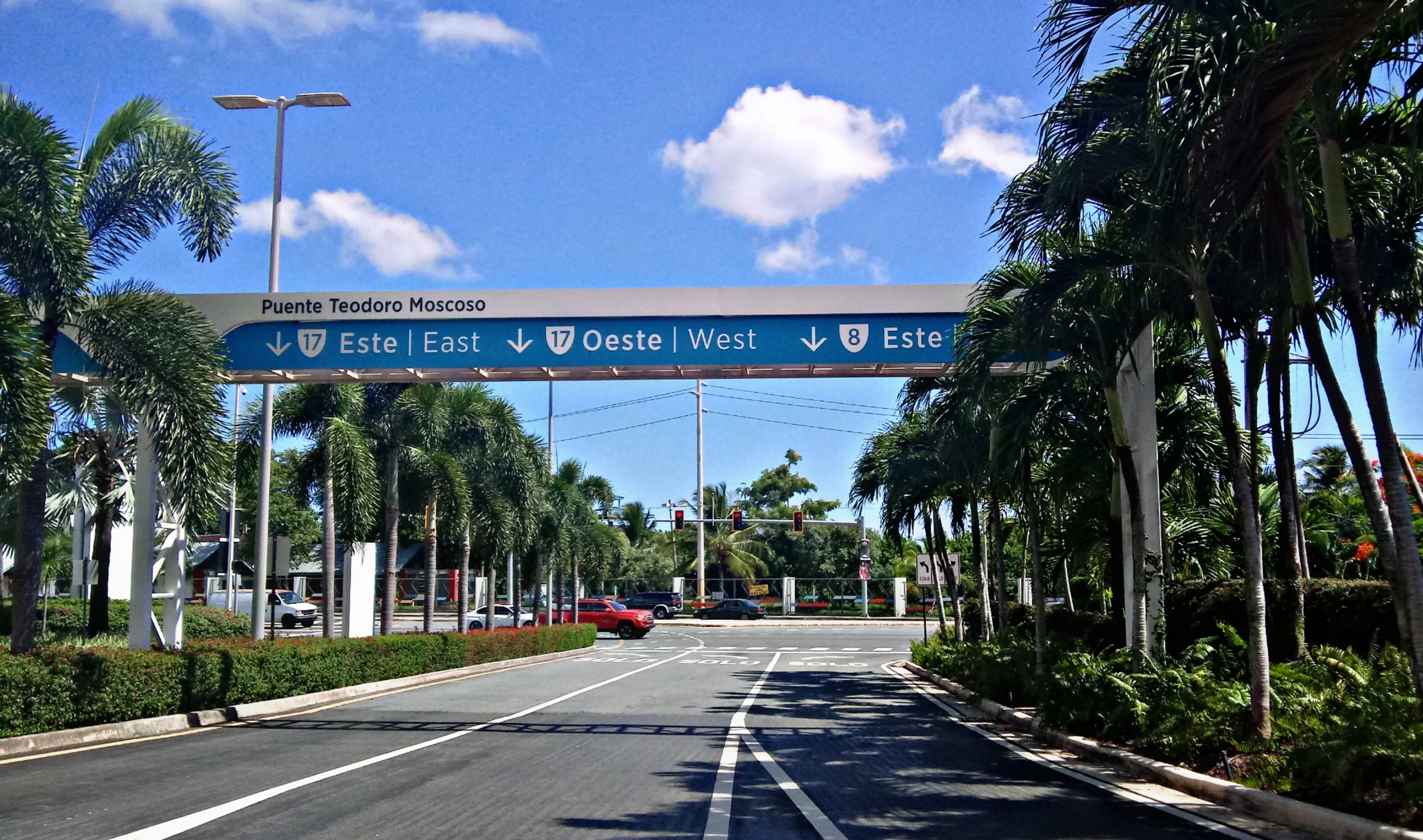
PR-17 at the Puente Teodoro Moscoso near the Mall of San Juan

== Tolls ==
Location	Toll	Direction	AutoExpreso acceptance	AutoExpreso replenishment (R) lane
Puente Teodoro Moscoso	$4.00	Two-way		

== Major intersections ==
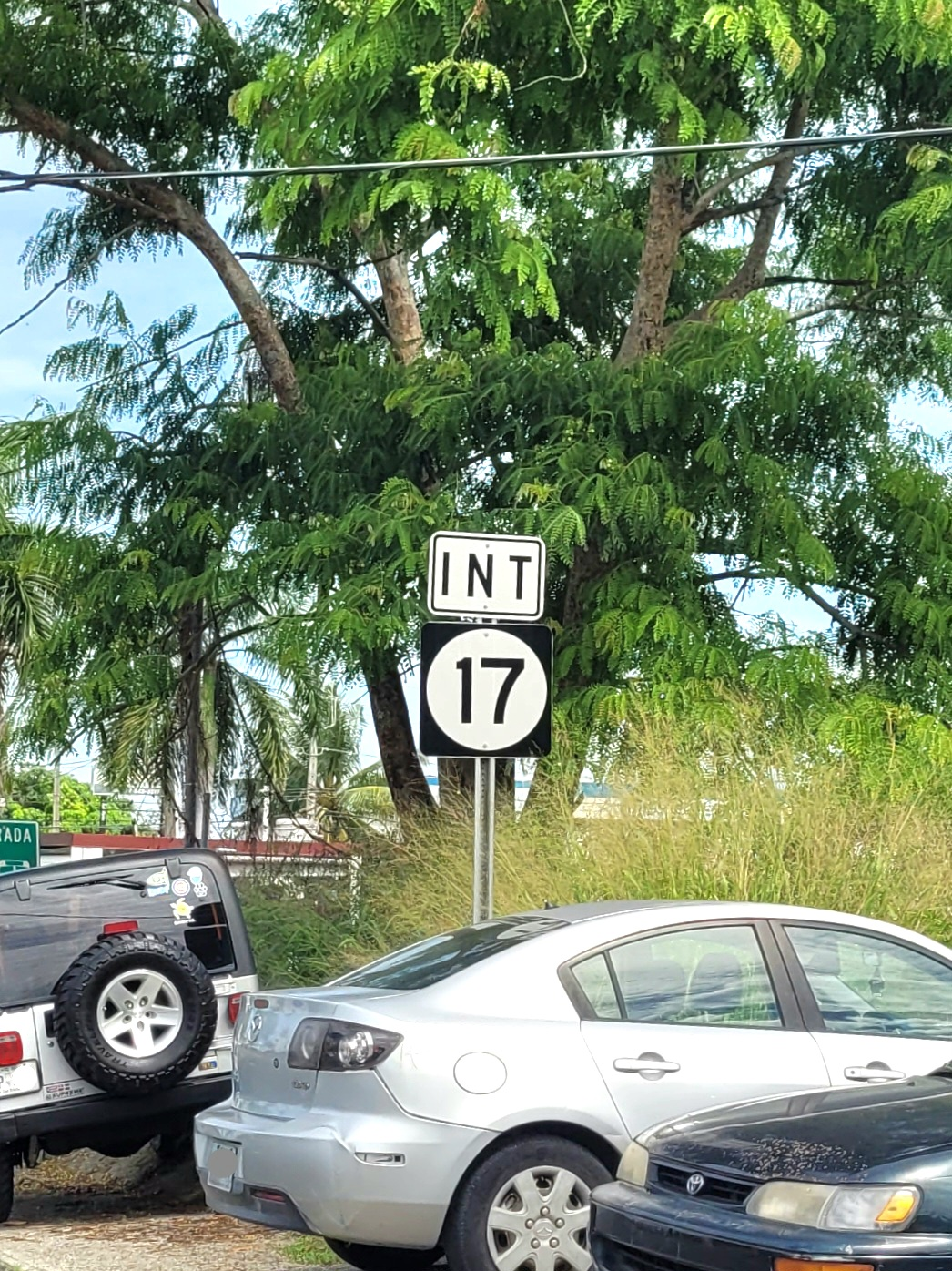
PR-19 north near PR-17 intersection in Gobernador Piñero, San Juan

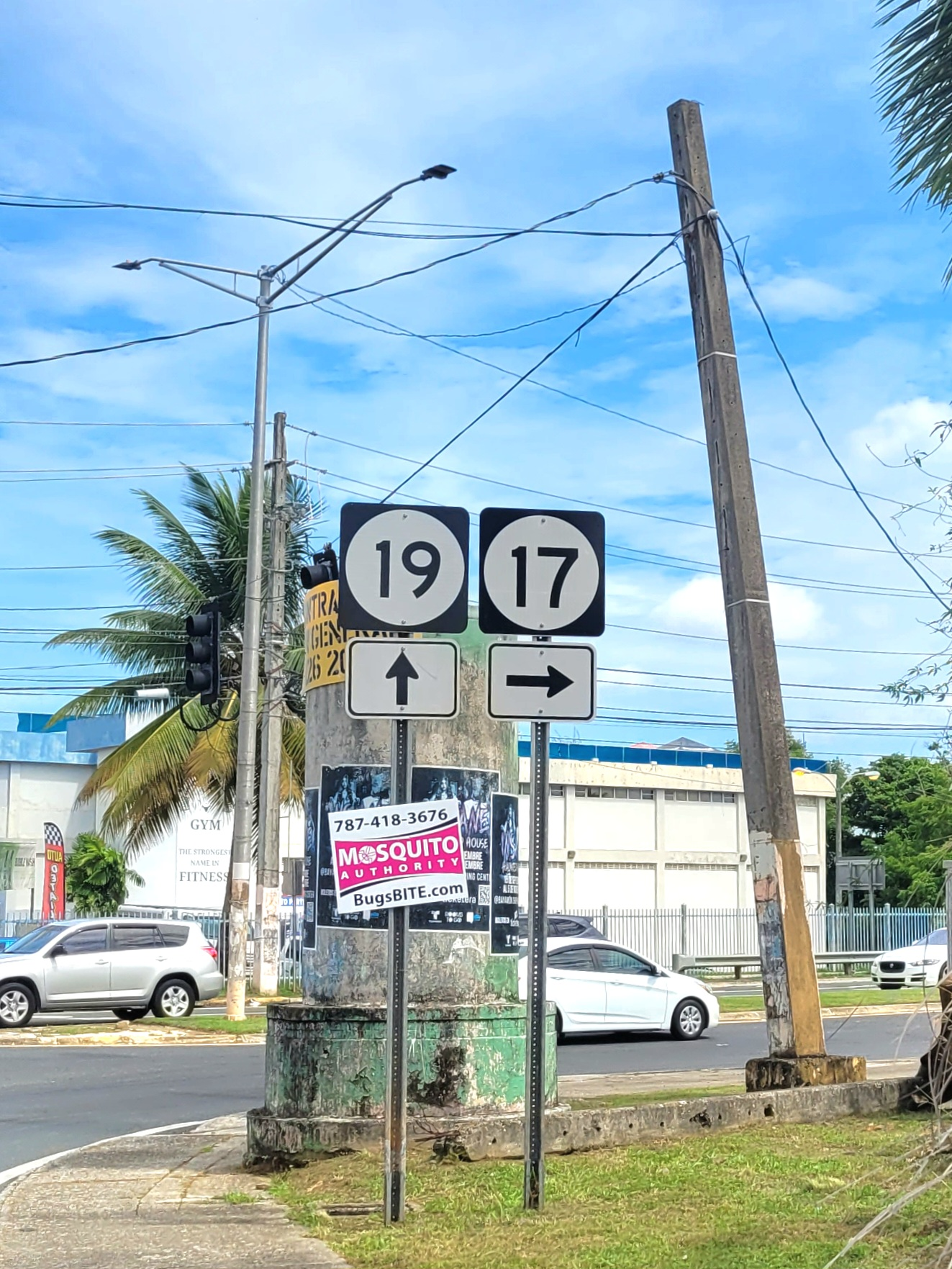
PR-19 north at the western terminus of PR-17 in Gobernador Piñero, San Juan

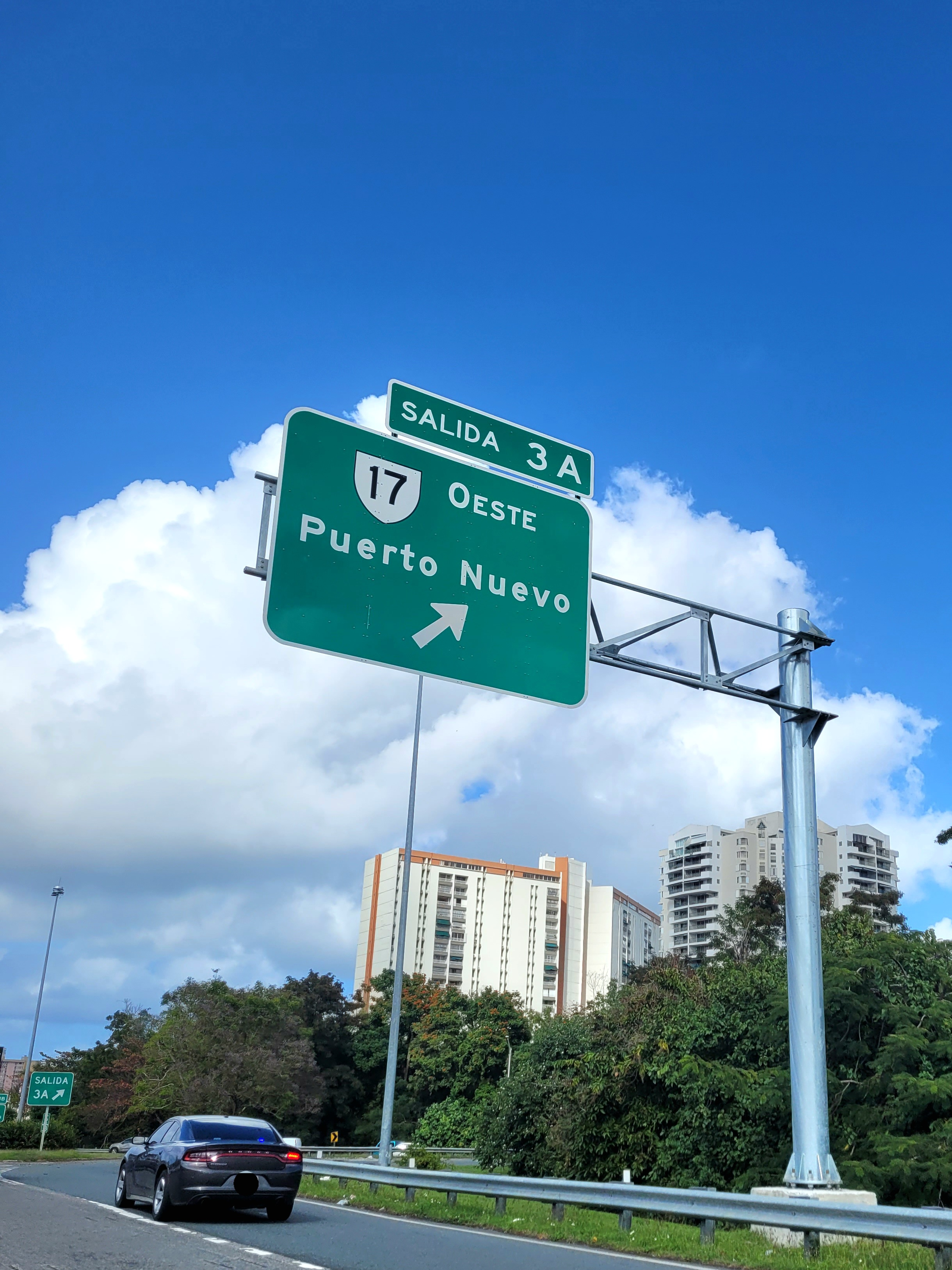
PR-18 north at exit 3A to PR-17 west in Gobernador Piñero, San Juan

Municipality	Location	km	mi	Exit	Destinations	Notes
San Juan	Gobernador Piñero	0.0	0.0		PR-19 (Avenida Luis Vigoreaux) to PR-20 south (Expreso Rafael Martínez Nadal) / PR-21 – Río Piedras, Bayamón	Western terminus of PR-17
San Juan	Gobernador Piñero	0.3– 0.4	0.19– 0.25		PR-20 (Expreso Rafael Martínez Nadal) – Guaynabo, Bayamón, San Juan	Diamond interchange
San Juan	Gobernador Piñero	1.1	0.68		PR-Avenida San Patricio – Puerto Nuevo	
San Juan	Gobernador Piñero	2.3	1.4		PR-Avenida José de Diego – Puerto Nuevo	
San Juan	Gobernador Piñero	3.6	2.2		PR-Avenida Andalucía – Puerto Nuevo	
San Juan	Gobernador Piñero	4.2	2.6		PR-18 (Expreso Las Américas) – San Juan, Bayamón, Arecibo, Caguas	PR-18 exits 5A and 5B; cloverleaf interchange
San Juan	Hato Rey Sur–Hato Rey Norte line	4.5	2.8		To PR-41 (Calle César L. González) – Hato Rey	
San Juan	Hato Rey Sur	4.7	2.9		PR-41 (Calle César L. González) / PR-Extensión Calle César L. González – Hato Rey	
San Juan	Hato Rey Sur	5.6	3.5	—	PR-1 (Avenida Luis Muñoz Rivera) – Hato Rey, Río Piedras	Eastern terminus of Avenida Jesús T. Piñero; western terminus of Expreso Jesús T. Piñero; partial cloverleaf interchange
San Juan	Hato Rey Sur–Universidad line	6.0	3.7	—	PR-25 north (Avenida Juan Ponce de León) – Hato Rey	One-way street; diamond interchange
San Juan	Universidad	6.9– 7.0	4.3– 4.3	—	PR-27 (Avenida José Celso Barbosa) – Hato Rey	Diamond interchange
San Juan	Oriente	7.7– 7.8	4.8– 4.8	—	PR-Calle Rafael López Sicardó – Río Piedras	Right turn only; no access across PR-17
San Juan	Oriente	8.1– 8.5	5.0– 5.3	8	PR-181 south (Expreso Manuel Rivera Morales) – Río Piedras, Trujillo Alto	Eastbound exit signed as 7B; The Mall of San Juan is accessible from exit 7A
San Juan	Oriente	9.1	5.7	—	PR-8 east (Avenida Ramal Este) – Carolina, The Mall of San Juan	Trumpet interchange
Laguna San José		9.1– 11.3	5.7– 7.0	Puente Teodoro Moscoso; toll bridge		
Carolina	Cangrejo Arriba	11.5	7.1	—	PR-26 (Expreso Román Baldorioty de Castro) / PR-Avenida Salvador V. Caro – San Juan, Carolina	Eastern terminus of PR-17; western terminus of Avenida Salvador V. Caro; PR-26 exits 8A and 8B; cloverleaf interchange
1.000 mi = 1.609 km; 1.000 km = 0.621 mi: Incomplete access; Tolled; Route transition

== See also ==
- Jesús T. Piñero
