= Puerto Rico Highway 41 =

Highway in Puerto Rico

Highway 41
- Ruta 41

Route information
- Maintained by Puerto Rico DTPW
- Length: 2.4 km (1.5 mi)

Major junctions
- South end: PR-17 in Hato Rey Sur
- PR-1 in Hato Rey Norte
- North end: PR-25 in Hato Rey Norte–Hato Rey Central

Location
- Country: United States
- Territory: Puerto Rico
- Municipalities: San Juan

Highway system
- Roads in Puerto Rico; List
← PR-40	→ PR-42

Puerto Rico Highway 41 (PR-41) is an urban road in Hato Rey, Puerto Rico. This is a short road that connects from the PR-25 (Avenida Juan Ponce de León) to PR-17 (Avenida Jesús T. Piñero). This road runs along the Calle Eleanor Roosevelt and the southern part of Calle César L. González.

== Major intersections ==
The entire route is located in San Juan.

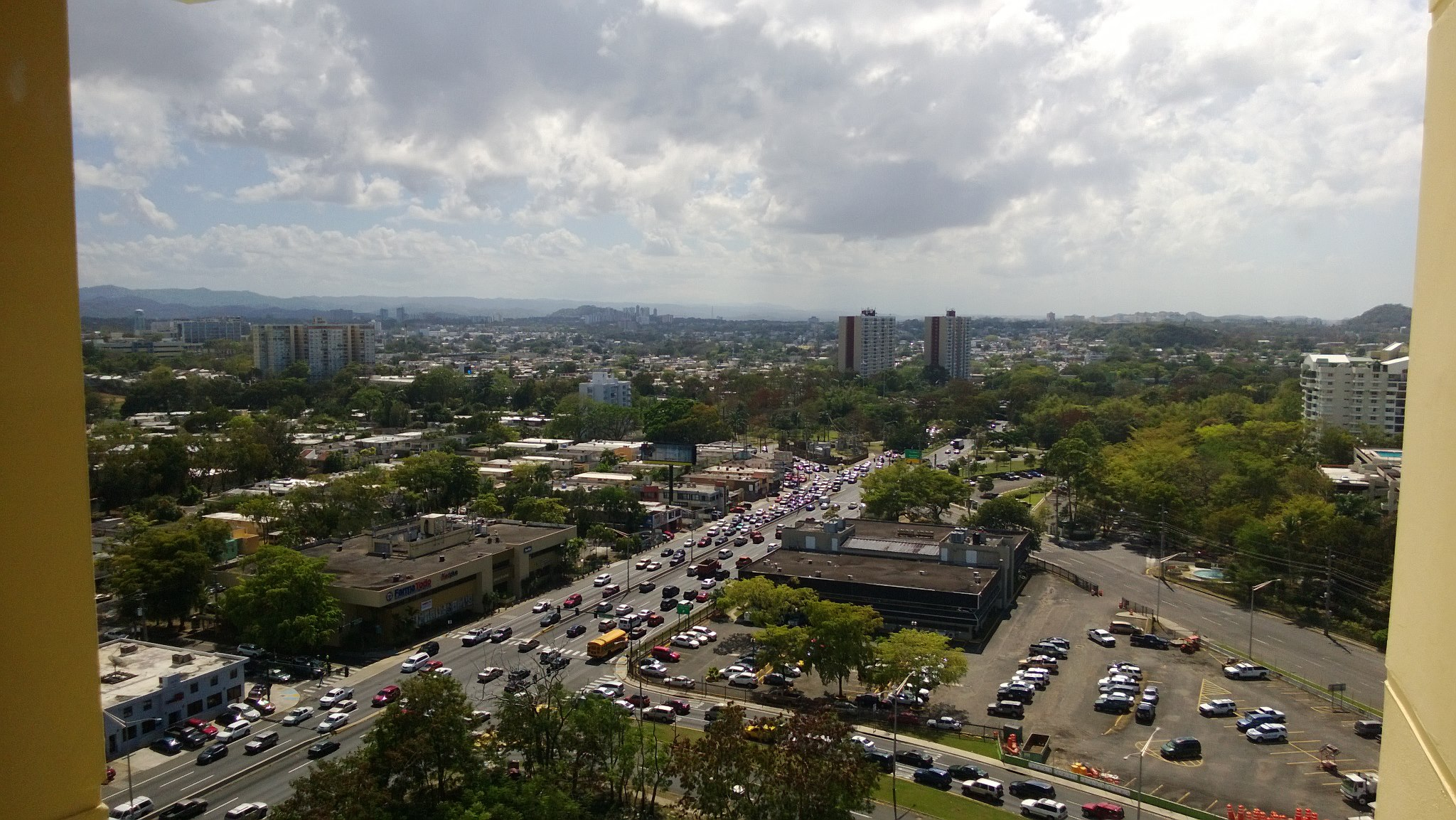
PR-17 (left) at its junction with PR-41 (right)

Location	km	mi	Destinations	Notes
Hato Rey Sur	2.4	1.5	PR-17 (Avenida Jesús T. Piñero) – Carolina, Guaynabo	Southern terminus of PR-41
Hato Rey Sur–Hato Rey Norte line	2.2	1.4	To PR-17 west (Avenida Jesús T. Piñero) / PR-Calle César L. González – Guaynabo	Northern terminus of PR-41 through Extensión Calle César L. González; southern terminus of PR-41 through Calle César L. González
Hato Rey Norte	1.7	1.1	To PR-18 (Expreso Las Américas) / PR-Calle Manuel Domenech – Hato Rey	
Hato Rey Norte	1.1	0.68	PR-Calle César L. González / PR-Calle Eleanor Roosevelt – Hato Rey	Northern terminus of PR-41 through Calle César L. González; western terminus of PR-41 through Calle Eleanor Roosevelt
Hato Rey Norte	0.1	0.062	PR-1 south (Avenida Luis Muñoz Rivera) – Río Piedras, Caguas	One-way street
Hato Rey Norte–Hato Rey Central line	0.0	0.0	PR-25 north (Avenida Juan Ponce de León) – San Juan, Santurce	Northern terminus of PR-41; one-way street
1.000 mi = 1.609 km; 1.000 km = 0.621 mi: Route transition
