= SR20 =

SR20 may refer to:

- Cirrus SR20, a piston engine composite monoplane
- Nissan SR engine, a Nissan straight-4 4-stroke engine
- State Road 2 or State Route 2; see List of highways numbered 20
