= List of highways numbered 20 =

Route 20, or Highway 20, may refer to:

== International ==
- E20 European route E20

== Australia ==
- Sturt Highway (NSW/VIC/SA)
- Yarra Bank Highway

== Brazil ==
- BR-020

== Canada ==
- Alberta Highway 20
- British Columbia Highway 20
- Manitoba Highway 20
- New Brunswick Route 20 (former)
- Newfoundland and Labrador Route 20
- Ontario Highway 20
- Prince Edward Island Route 20
- Quebec Autoroute 20
- Saskatchewan Highway 20

== China ==
- G20 Expressway

== Cuba ==
- Highway 6–20

== Czech Republic ==
- I/20 Highway; Czech: Silnice I/20

== Ecuador ==
- Ecuador Highway 20

== Greece ==
- EO20 road

== India ==
- National Highway 20 (India)

== Israel ==
- Ayalon Highway

== Italy ==
- Autostrada A20

== Ireland ==
- M20 motorway (Ireland)
- N20 road (Ireland)

== Japan ==
- Japan National Route 20
- Chūō Expressway

== Korea, South ==
- Iksan–Pohang Expressway
- National Route 20
- Gukjido 20

== Malaysia ==
- Maju Expressway
- FT 20 North Klang Straits Bypass

== New Zealand ==
- New Zealand State Highway 20 (Auckland Southwestern Motorway)
  - New Zealand State Highway 20A
  - New Zealand State Highway 20B

== Paraguay ==
- National Route 20

== Turkey ==
- O-20, a motorway in Turkey as the ring road in Ankara.
- State road D.020 (Turkey)

== United Kingdom ==
- British A20 (London-Dover)
- British M20 (Swanley-Folkestone)
- A20 road (Northern Ireland)

== United States ==
- Interstate 20
- U.S. Route 20
  - U.S. Route 20N (former)
  - U.S. Route 20S (former)
- New England Route 20 (former)
- Alabama State Route 20
  - County Route 20 (Lee County, Alabama)
- Arkansas Highway 20
- California State Route 20
  - County Route A20 (California)
  - County Route E20 (California)
  - County Route G20 (California)
  - County Route J20 (California)
  - County Route S20 (California)
- Connecticut Route 20
- Delaware Route 20
- Florida State Road 20
- Georgia State Route 20
  - Georgia State Route 20 (former)
  - Georgia State Route 20 (former)
- Illinois Route 20 (former)
- K-20 (Kansas highway)
- Kentucky Route 20
- Louisiana Highway 20
  - Louisiana State Route 20
- Maryland Route 20
- Massachusetts Route 20
- M-20 (Michigan highway)
- Minnesota State Highway 20
  - County Road 20 (Goodhue County, Minnesota)
- Missouri Route 20
- Nevada State Route 20 (former)
- New Jersey Route 20
  - County Route 20 (Monmouth County, New Jersey)
- New Mexico State Road 20
- New York State Route 20 (1924–1927) (former)
  - New York State Route 20N (former)
  - New York State Route 20SY (former)
  - County Route 20 (Allegany County, New York)
  - County Route 20 (Clinton County, New York)
  - County Route 20 (Columbia County, New York)
  - County Route 20 (Delaware County, New York)
  - County Route 20 (Dutchess County, New York)
  - County Route 20 (Genesee County, New York)
  - County Route 20 (Livingston County, New York)
  - County Route 20 (Niagara County, New York)
  - County Route 20 (Ontario County, New York)
  - County Route 20 (Orange County, New York)
  - County Route 20 (Oswego County, New York)
  - County Route 20 (Otsego County, New York)
  - County Route 20 (Putnam County, New York)
  - County Route 20 (Rensselaer County, New York)
  - County Route 20 (Rockland County, New York)
  - County Route 20 (Suffolk County, New York)
  - County Route 20 (Ulster County, New York)
  - County Route 20 (Washington County, New York)
  - County Route 20 (Yates County, New York)
- North Carolina Highway 20
- North Dakota Highway 20
- Ohio State Route 20 (1923-1927) (former)
- Oklahoma State Highway 20
- South Carolina Highway 20
- South Dakota Highway 20
- Tennessee State Route 20
- Texas State Highway 20
  - Texas State Highway Loop 20
  - Farm to Market Road 20
  - Texas Park Road 20
- Utah State Route 20
- Virginia State Route 20
- Washington State Route 20
- West Virginia Route 20
- Wisconsin Highway 20

Territories

- Puerto Rico Highway 20
- U.S. Virgin Islands Highway 20

== Vietnam ==
- National Route 20 (Vietnam)

== Zambia ==
- M20 road (Zambia)

== See also ==
- List of A20 roads
- List of highways numbered 20A
- List of highways numbered 20B
- List of highways numbered 20C
- List of highways numbered 20D

Preceded by 19	Lists of highways 20	Succeeded by 21
