= San Juan Police Department =

Main police force for the city of San Juan, Puerto Rico

San Juan Police Department Policía Municipal de San Juan
- Motto: Protection, Security

Agency overview
- Formed: 1977

Jurisdictional structure
- Operations jurisdiction: San Juan, Puerto Rico
- Map of San Juan Police Department's jurisdiction
- Area: 47.82 mi^{2} (123.9 km^{2})
- Population: 434,374 (2000 estimate)
- Legal jurisdiction: San Juan, Puerto Rico
- General nature: Local civilian police

Operational structure
- Headquarters: San Juan, Puerto Rico
- Police Officers: 781
- Supervision s: List: Highway Patrol; Community Relations; Strategy Operations; Rescue; Maritime Unit; Impact Unit

Facilities
- Precinct s: List: San Juan/Puerta de Tierra; Barrio Obrero; Santurce; Loiza St./Condado; West Hato Rey; East Hato Rey; Rio Piedras; Antillas; Cupey; Montehiedra
- Police cars: Ford Crown Victoria Police Interceptor; Ford Mustang; Ford Explorer; Dodge Durango; Dodge Charger; Chevrolet Impala
- Helicopters: Bell 206 Jet Ranger

Website
- sanjuan.pr/servicios/seguridad/

The San Juan Police Department is the primary law enforcement agency for the city of San Juan, PR, with jurisdiction only in the city limits of San Juan. It is also the largest municipal police force in the commonwealth, and the second largest of any police force in the commonwealth, after the Puerto Rico Police Department. It was created in 1977 under law #19 of May 12, 1977, known as the Municipal Police Law creating local police forces in each city of Puerto Rico.

== Size ==
In 2020, the San Juan police force was the largest in Puerto Rico with 781 police officers.

== Police divisions ==
The San Juan Police Department is divided into many units providing better protection for the city of San Juan. These are:

=== Highway Patrol ===
The SJPD Highway Patrol has the responsibility of patrolling the streets, thoroughfares and expressways of San Juan preventing and investigating traffic accidents, arresting drivers under the influence of alcohol, and preventing the use of the streets, roadways, and expressways as a place for illegal street racing, all in collaboration with the Highway Patrol Division of the Puerto Rico Police Bureau.

=== Tourist Police ===
This unit was created to attend the safety and security needs in the tourist areas of San Juan, including the area of Old San Juan, Condado and Ocean Park.

=== Impact Unit ===
The Impact Unit is the SWAT team of the SJPD. They are in charge of any hostage situation, tactical raid, riot or any special situation that any other unit cannot handle. They are trained like the PRPD SWAT team and the Tactical Operations Division.

=== Community Relations ===
The SJPD Community relations Division is in charge of any community activity involving the police and the community. They also are in charge of the Athletic Youth League; this is a program where children and youth of the community are provided with guidelines about not using drugs, they are taken from touring and doing activities with a healthy purpose to keep these children and youth away from violence and crime. They are closely monitored by officers and leaders of the community to give greater security and better use the program.

=== Maritime Unit ===
The SJPD Maritime Unit is in charged of patrolling the viable water connections of the San Juan Estuary, including the San Jose lagoon and the San Juan Bay. In union with the PRPD San Juan Maritime Unit, they are also responsible for guarding the San Juan Port Area. They are also in charge of patrolling the coastal waters of the Atlantic Ocean inside the San Juan water limits. They are headquartered at San Juan Central Park, near the fishing pier.

=== Air Unit ===
The SJPD Air unit created in February 2010, became the first municipal police air unit in Puerto Rico, and the second police air unit after the creation of the PRPD Air Unit in 1963. Is composed of a single Bell 206 in black and white. Its airlifted every morning and afternoon from Monday to Friday for traffic patrol. If requested by SJPD officers, it supports ground and maritime units for critical situations. Its based at Roig Police Air Base in Isla Grande Airport.

At 9:28pm, on May 4, 2010, the SJPD helicopter received gun fire from a group of suspect carrying AK-47's that were involved on a pursuit with PRPD officers on the San Juan's eastern neighborhood of San Jose. The helicopter made an emergency landing on a baseball field. Of the 4 members of the crew, one was killed (co-pilot) and the other one was injured (flight observer). Because of the extensive damages to the helicopter it went out of service for repairs until June 24, 2010 were on an official ceremony on the place where the SJPD Helicopter made the emergency landing on that baseball field, San Juan mayor Jorge Santinni and Police Commissioner Hilton Cordero re-inaugurated the Air Unit. Now, all SJPD flight officers must wear bulletproof vests during flight. Also, the SJPD is making arrangements to add another helicopter to their fleet.

== Police zones ==
The San Juan Police Department is divided into three police zones, which give complete security to the entire city limits of San Juan, including the financial district, historic and tourist area and the southern suburbs. In turn, areas are divided into precincts, and some precincts have a base of community safety which are placed there and its surrounding areas for its high crime rate. These areas are:

=== Zone 1 (Northern) ===
The SJPD Zone 1 or better known as northern zone is composed of four precincts, three bases of community safety and two specialized units. It covers the area from the islet of San Juan to the boundary of the Rio Puerto Nuevo. It covers several communities, including government buildings, municipal parks, nightclubs and tourist zones. These are:

=== San Juan ===
The SJPD San Juan precinct, located at Juan A. Corretjer street in the Old San Juan historical site, covers the entire San Juan Islet, including La Fortaleza, City Hall, the capitol, tourist ports and a United States Coast Guard base, and the Puerta de Tierra neighborhood. The precinct includes community safety base of City Hall where it provides greater protection to the Mayor, City Hall and the community.

=== Santurce ===
The Santurce precinct, located in the San Juan Central Park behind the natatorium, covers the Santurce ward including most of the San Juan port area along PR-2 (John F. Kennedy Ave.) better known as the Panamerican Port. The precinct covers the area of the building of the Department of Justice of Puerto Rico in the Miramar area, the Convention District including the Fernando Ribas Dominicci Airport and the Puerto Rico Convention Center, the Luis A. Ferré Performing Arts Center, the state government building in Minillas and nightclubs along the Ponce de Leon avenue; it also covers the SJPD Maritime division. Its northern limit is the Baldorioty de Castro avenue, the east by the district and the Borinquen Avenue, west by the San Juan Bay and south by PR-22 or the Jose de Diego expressway.

=== Barrio Obrero ===
The Barrio Obrero precinct, located at #2100 Eduardo Conde avenue covers the Barrio Obrero district, including the area known as "Little Quisqueya" and the neighborhoods of Las Casas, Merhoff, Herrera, Las Plamas, Monteflores, Sagrado Corazon, Maria Mozco, Chicarro, Seboruco and Pulguero. It also has a Community Safety Base located at #2206 Eduardo Conde avenue. This community base covers the little square of the "salseros" (Placita de los Salseros) and the area of Villa Palmeras. The precinct is bounded on the north by the Baldorioty de Castro Avenue, south to the creek Martin Peña, west to Ponce de Leon Avenue and east to the San José lagoon.

=== Condado/Loiza Street ===
The Condado/Loiza Street precinct, located at #107 Tapia street, covers the tourist district of Condado, including the neighborhoods of Alto del Cabro, Bayola, Condadito, Parque and Pozo del Hato. It also covers the neighborhoods along Loiza Street, including the Luis Llorens Torres housing complex, Ocean Park, and the San Juan Beach Front. The precinct has a base of community safety, located at #1352 Luchetti street, in the Condado square. This is more concentrated in tourist areas of Condado, including hotels and nightclubs.

=== Zone 2 (Central) ===
The SJPD Zone 2, better known as "Central" is the zone that covers the central wards of San Juan, from the area of Puerto Nuevo to the shores of the San Jose lagoon. This consists of 3 precincts and 1 sub-station. It protects the Plaza Las Americas mall, financial district, various sports and entertainment centers and hundreds of homes along its jurisdiction. This precincts are:

=== Puerto Nuevo ===
The Puerto Nuevo precinct, located on the corner of Piñero Ave and 8th Street, covering the neighborhoods of Monacillos, Villa España, Las Lomas, Villa Esperanza, Piñero, Puerto Nuevo West, South Puerto Nuevo, Puerto Nuevo Este, Avenida Roosevelt, Rio Piedras Medical Center and Veterans Hospital. Its boundaries are on the west by the city of Guaynabo, PR on the south-21 east to the flow of the Rio Piedras and north by the Jose de Diego expressway.

=== West Hato Rey ===
Located on the corner of Hostos street with Eleanor Roosevelt street, West Hato Rey precinct covers the Plaza Las Americas Mall, both José Miguel Agrelot and Roberto Clemente coliseums, the Hiram Bithorn Stadium, the United States federal building, the Puerto Rico Police Department headquarters, San Juan's financial district and the neighborhoods of Roosevelt, El Vedado, Martin Pena, Baldrich, El Monte, Nemesio R. Channels among others in its jurisdiction. It also has a sub-station at the Plaza Las Americas mall, which are intended to provide protection along with the PRPD and mall security to the thousands of people visiting the largest mall in the Caribbean. Its limited in the north by the Martin Peña creek, west with the flow of the Rio Puerto Nuevo, on the east by Barbosa Avenue and south by the PR-17 (Piñero Avenue).

=== East Hato Rey ===
Located at the Rebekah Colberg sport complex, the East Hato Rey precinct covers the neighborhoods of San Jose, Embalse San Jose, Bravos de Boston, Barbosa, Villa Prades, Dos Pinos, Ramos Antonini, Manuel A. Perrez, Lopez Sicardo, El Prado and the Teodoro Moscoso Bridge in his jurisdiction. Its limited in the north by the San Jose lagoon, by the south with 65th Infantry Avenue and the Jose de Diego Avenue, by the east with the city limits of Carolina, and by the west with the Barbosa Avenue.

=== Zone 3 (Southern) ===
The SJPD zone 3, better known as "South zone", it is the area that covers the suburbs of San Juan, including the college town of Rio Piedras, the mountainous areas of Cupey and Caimito, and high-crime areas of the east San Juan area. It is composed of 4 precincts, 3 bases of community safety, a specialize unit station and the San Juan Police Department's headquarters.

=== Rio Piedras ===
Located at #64 Tizol street, the Rio Piedras precinct protects the areas of Downtown Rio Piedras, the neighborhoods of Capetillo, Hyde Park, University Gardens, Santa Rita, Buen Consejo, Venezuela, San Agustin, De Diego, Park Gardens, the metropolitan campus of the University of Puerto Rico, the San Juan Botanical Garden and other places along its jurisdiction. Its limited in the north by the Piñero avenue, in the south by the 65th Infantry Avenue, in the east by PR-181 (Trujillo Alto freeway), and in the west by the Las Americas Expressway.

=== Antillas ===
Located at 65th Infantry Avenue, near the Jardines de Monte Hatillo public housing, the Antillas precinct covers the neighborhoods of Sabana Llana, Oriente, Hill Brothers, Villa Granada, Berwind, Jardines de Monte Hatillo, Monte Park, Country Club, Jardines de Country Club, El Escorial, Santo Domingo, among other communities within their jurisdiction. Also, the area is home to the SJPD Impact Unit, located on Country Club. This bordered on the north and east boundaries of the city of Carolina, south to the limits of the city of Trujillo Alto and west by the PR-181.

=== Cupey ===
Located in the PR-176 near the baseball field, the Cupey precinct serves the communities of Cupey Alto, Cupey Bajo, Cupey Gardens, El Cerezal, El Señorial, Los Paseos, El Cinco, El Paraiso, Rio Piedras Heights, Rivieras of Cupey, Venus Gardens, Antigua Via, Litheda Heights and public housings of Jardines de Cupey, Brisas de Cupey, Alturas de Cupey, Los Lirios and Los Laureles, among other communities within their jurisdiction. Also, it has 2 bases of community safety, one in Venus Gardens and another in Rio Piedras Heights. This limited the north with the connector C of Venus Gardens and the PR-1, on the south limits of the city of Caguas, east to city limits and Trujillo Alto, and west by the PR-18.

=== Montehiedra ===
Located across the street form the Montehiedra Town Center mall, the Montehiedra precinct serves the neighborhoods of Caimito, Los Robles, Las Cumbres, Quebrada Areneas, La Pava, El 25, Monacillo and other neighborhoods along his jurisdiction. Its limited in the north by the PR-1 and PR-177 (Lomas Verdes Avenue), in the south by the city limits of Caguas, in the east by PR-18 (Las Americas Expressway), and by the west with the Guaynabo city limits.

== See also ==
- Ponce Police Department
- Aguadilla City Police Department
- Puerto Rico Police Department
