= List of highways numbered 20D =

The following highways are numbered 20D:

== United States ==
- Nebraska Highway 20D (former)
- New York State Route 20D (former)

== See also ==
- List of highways numbered 20
