= Academia Bautista de Puerto Nuevo =

Baptist school in Puerto Nuevo, San Juan, Puerto Rico

- Puerto Nuevo, San Juan, Puerto Rico

Information
- Type: Baptist
- Opened: 1956
- Grades: pre-kinder to 12
- Enrollment: 1100
- Website: http://abpnpr.com

Academia Bautista de Puerto Nuevo or ABPN is a private Baptist Academy located in Puerto Nuevo, a part of San Juan, Puerto Rico. The Academia Bautista de Puerto Nuevo was established in 1956 offering Kindergarten through 8th grade and sometime in the late 1980s it expanded to offer a High School Program.

The school currently serves 1,100 students in grades from pre-kinder to 12. The academy is sponsored by the Primera Iglesia Bautista de Puerto Nuevo as a service to the community in general. The academy is accredited by The General Council of Puerto Rican Education and the Middle States Association of Colleges and Schools. The Academia Bautista de Puerto Nuevo is also affiliated with:

- Caribbean Counselor's Association
- National Association of Secondary School Principals
- A participating Member of "Learn Aid"
- Member of the Private School Associations of Puerto Rico
- Participating Member of "The College Board"
