= List of A20 roads =

This is a list of roads designated A20. Roads entries are sorted in the countries alphabetical order.

- A20 road (Australia) may refer to:
  - Sturt Highway, a road in South Australia & New South Wales
  - Gawler Bypass, a road in South Australia
  - Main North Road, Adelaide, a road in South Australia
- A20 road (Canada) may refer to:
  - A20 expressway (Quebec), a road connecting Montreal and Quebec City
- A20 motorway (France), a road connecting Vierzon, Cher and Montauban, Tarn-et-Garonne
- A 20 motorway (Germany), a road connecting Schleswig-Holstein, Mecklenburg-Vorpommern and Brandenburg
- A20 motorway (Italy), a road connecting Messina and Palermo
- A20 motorway (Netherlands), a road connecting the N213 road and the A12 motorway
- A20 road (People's Republic of China) may refer to:
  - A20 expressway (Shanghai), the former name of the S20 expressway, a ring expressway around Shanghai often known as the Outer Ring Road
- A 20 road (Sri Lanka), a road connecting Anuradhapura and Rambewa
- A20 road (United Kingdom) may refer to:
  - A20 road (England), a road connecting London and Dover, Kent
  - A20 road (Isle of Man), a road connecting Peel and the A3
  - A20 road (Northern Ireland), a road connecting Belfast and Portaferry, County Down
- A20 road (United States of America) may refer to:
  - A20 road (California), a road connecting SR 89 and CR A19

== See also ==
- List of highways numbered 20
- List of 20A roads
- A2O, or Alps to Ocean, a cycleway in New Zealand
