= Puerto Rico Highway 21 =

Highway in Puerto Rico

Highway 21
- Ruta 21

Route information
- Maintained by Puerto Rico DTPW
- Length: 5.0 km (3.1 mi)

Major junctions
- West end: PR-19 in Gobernador Piñero
- PR-20 in Monacillo Urbano–Gobernador Piñero; PR-841 in Gobernador Piñero–Monacillo Urbano; PR-18 in Monacillo Urbano
- East end: PR-1 / PR-176 in El Cinco

Location
- Country: United States
- Territory: Puerto Rico
- Municipalities: San Juan

Highway system
- Roads in Puerto Rico; List
← PR-20	→ PR-22

Puerto Rico Highway 21 (PR-21) is the main highway to get to the Medical Center and Veterans Hospital in San Juan, Puerto Rico. Its western terminus is located at PR-19 intersection near Guaynabo and leads to San Juan before ending at PR-1 junction near Río Piedras.

== Route description ==
With a length of about 5.0 kilometers (3.1 mi), PR-21 begins at its intersection with PR-1 and PR-176 in El Cinco, a barrio located south of Río Piedras. To the west, PR-21 is an avenue with three lanes per direction until its interchange with Puerto Rico Highway 18 in Monacillo Urbano. From there, the highway narrows to two lanes per direction until its junction with Avenida José de Diego, where it reduces to a single lane per direction to the west. Between Monacillo Urbano and Gobernador Piñero barrios, the road has an intersection with PR-841, which leads to PR-177 between San Juan and Guaynabo, and also has an access to PR-20 south, which leads to Guaynabo. Then, its western terminus is located at PR-19 in Gobernador Piñero barrio, just at the entrance to Martínez Nadal station of the Tren Urbano.

Puerto Rico Highway 21

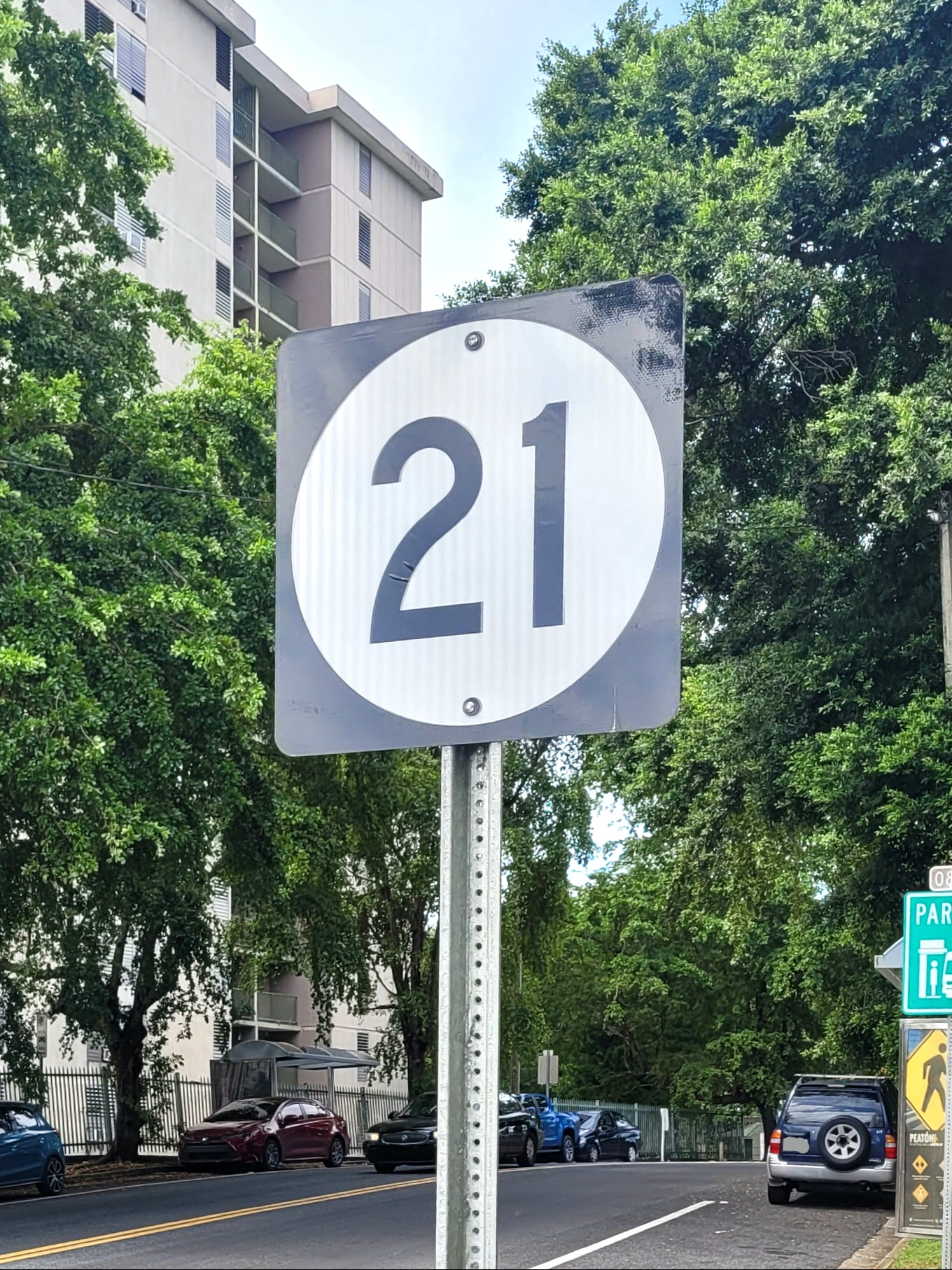
Heading west

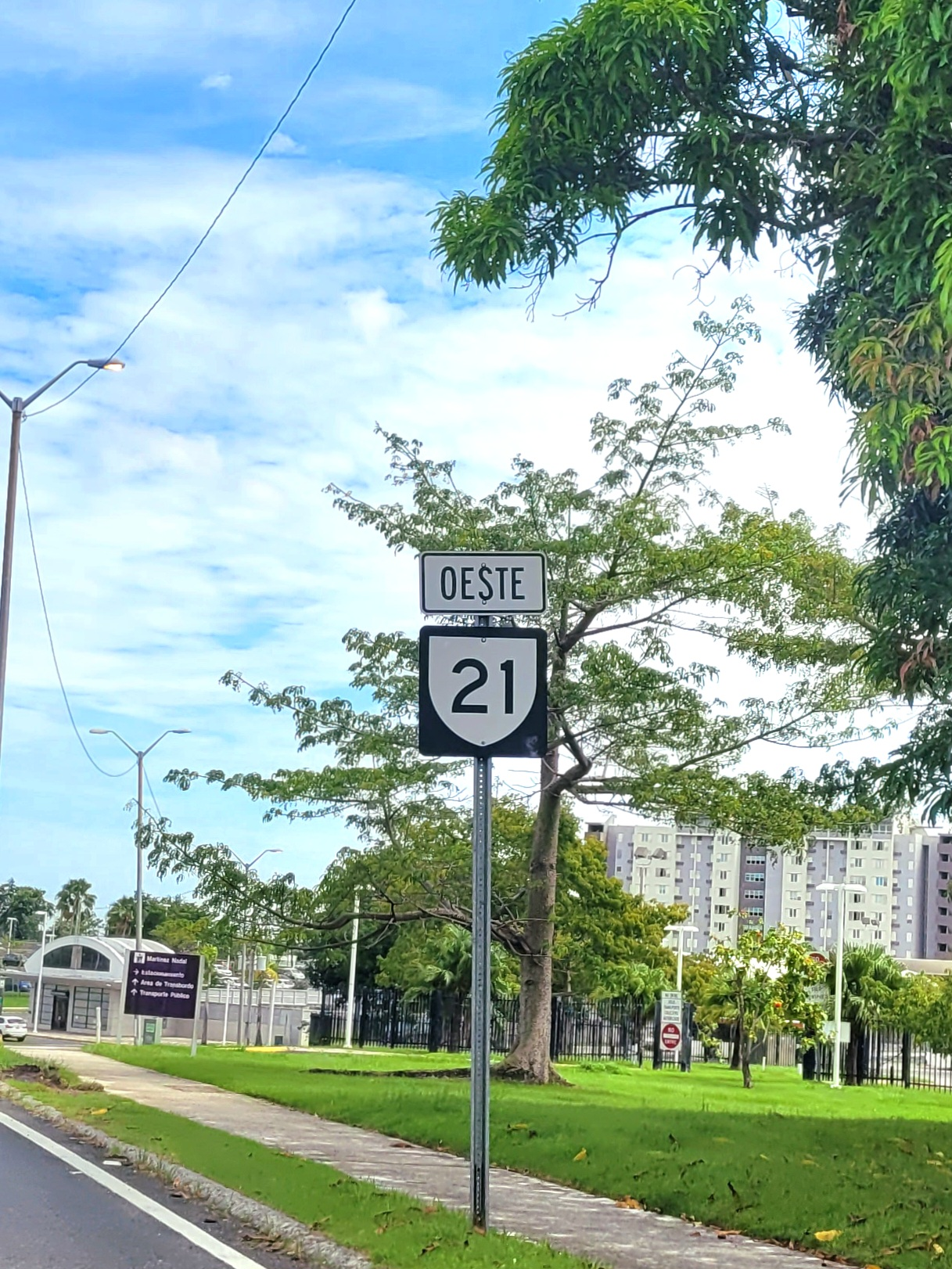
Westbound sign

== History ==
Puerto Rico Highway 6 was previously numbered as PR-21. Perhaps there were plans to connect current PR-21 to current PR-6, but such plans were never realized. Instead, the Tren Urbano tracks were built between Bayamón, Caparra, Torrimar and PR-20.

== Major intersections ==
The entire route is located in San Juan.

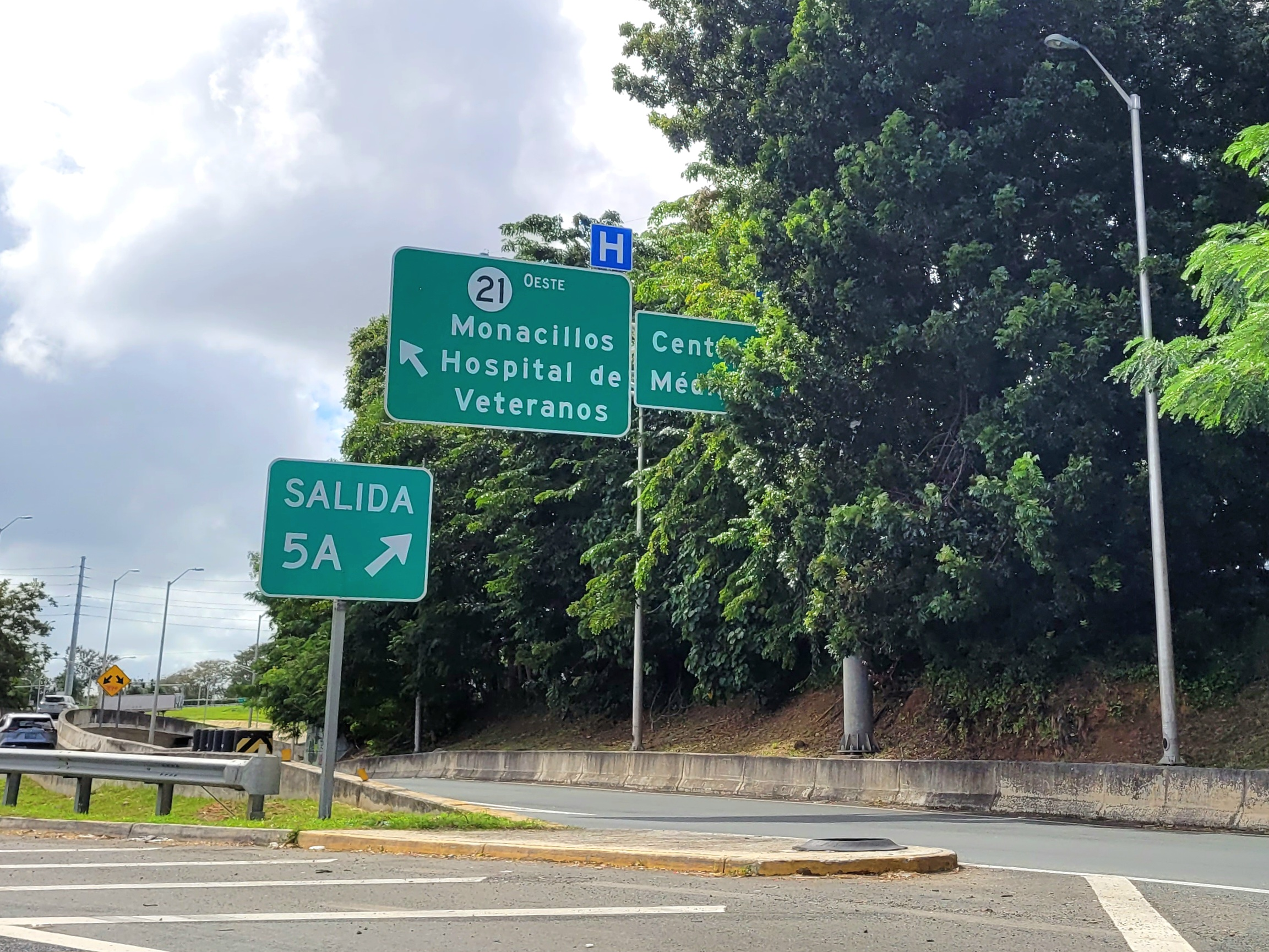
PR-18 south at exit 5A to PR-21 west

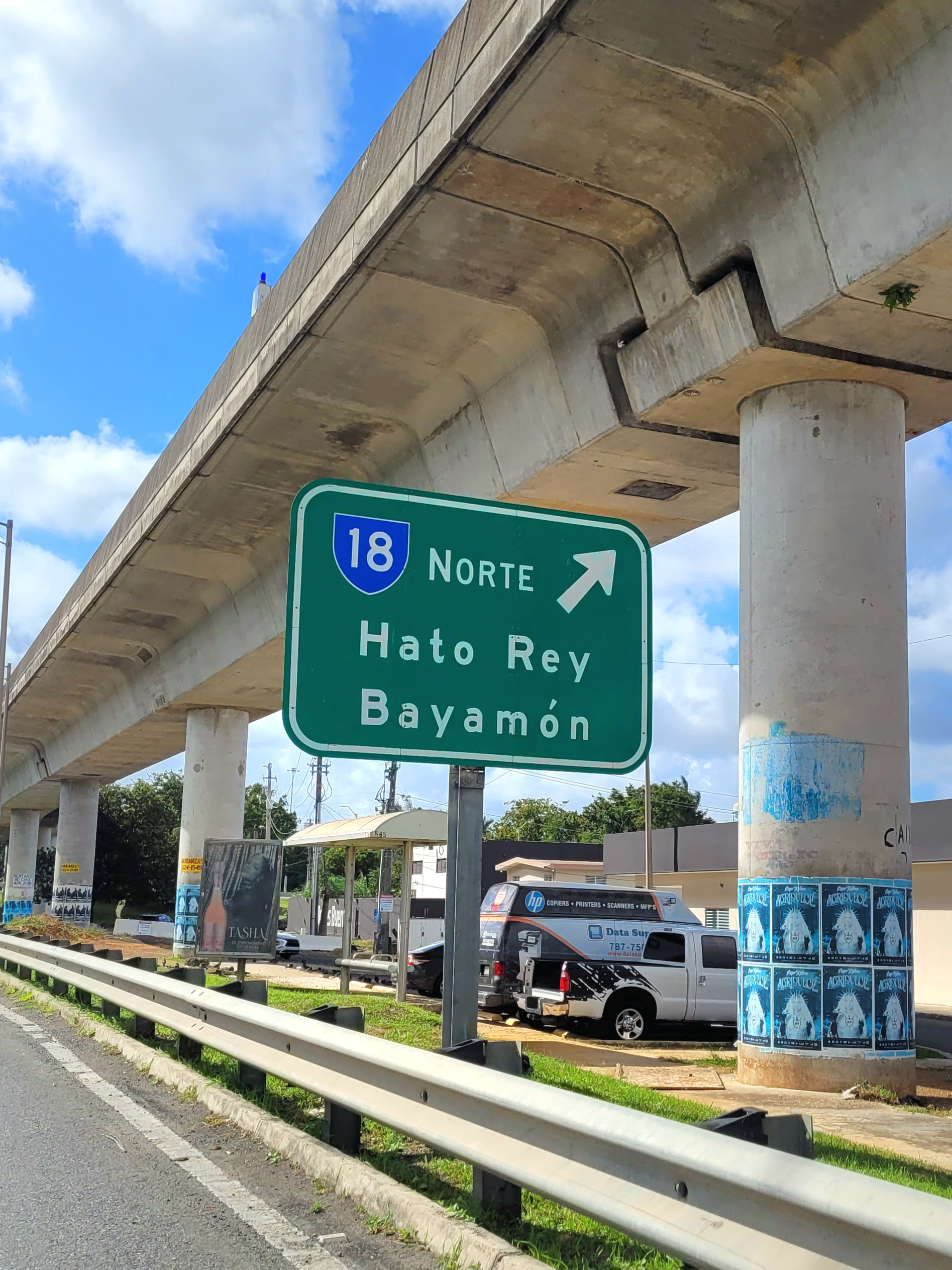
PR-21 west at PR-18 junction

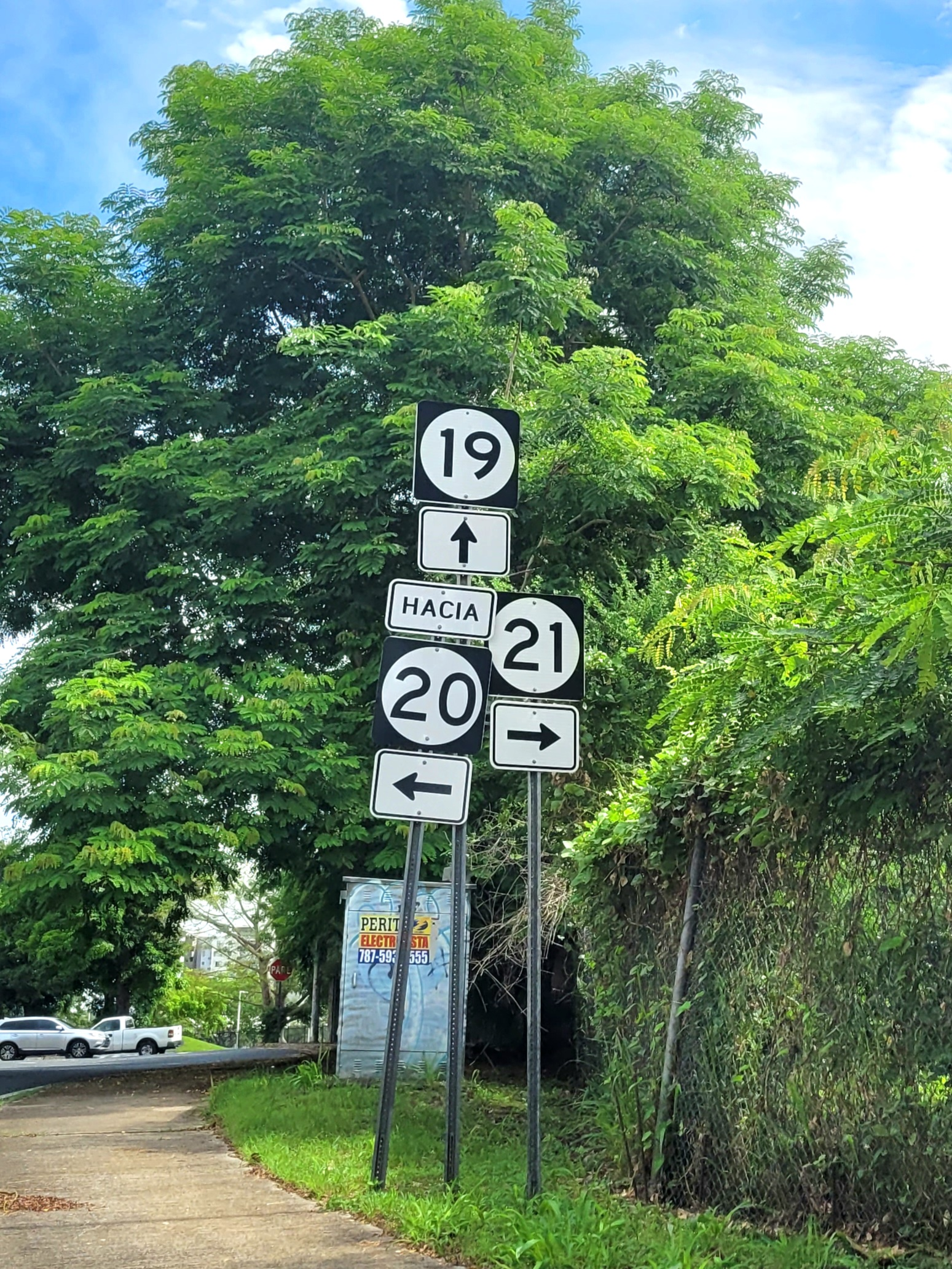
Signs for PR-19, PR-20 and PR-21

Location	km	mi	Destinations	Notes
Gobernador Piñero	5.0	3.1	PR-19 (Avenida Luis Vigoreaux) – Guaynabo	Western terminus of PR-21
Gobernador Piñero–Monacillo Urbano line	4.8– 4.7	3.0– 2.9	PR-20 (Expreso Rafael Martínez Nadal) – Guaynabo	No entrance ramp to PR-20 northbound
Gobernador Piñero–Monacillo Urbano line	3.4	2.1	PR-841 (Calle San Ignacio) – Guaynabo	
Monacillo Urbano	2.4	1.5	PR-Avenida José de Diego – San Juan, Puerto Nuevo	Eastern terminus of PR-21 through Carretera Roberto Clemente Walker; western terminus of PR-21 through Avenida Ingeniero José "Kiko" Custodio
Monacillo Urbano	1.5	0.93	PR-Avenida Centro Médico – San Juan	Partial cloverleaf interchange
Monacillo Urbano	1.2– 1.1	0.75– 0.68	PR-18 (Expreso Las Américas) – San Juan, Caguas, Ponce	PR-18 exits 7A and 7B; partial cloverleaf interchange
El Cinco	0.0	0.0	PR-1 (Carretera Felipe "La Voz" Rodríguez) – Río Piedras, Caguas	Eastern terminus of PR-21 and northern terminus of PR-176
El Cinco	0.0	0.0	PR-176 south (Avenida Ana G. Méndez)	Continuation beyond PR-1
1.000 mi = 1.609 km; 1.000 km = 0.621 mi: Incomplete access; Route transition
