= List of highways numbered 20C =

The following highways are numbered 20C:

== United States ==
- Nebraska Highway 20C (former)
- NY 20C (former)

== See also ==
- List of highways numbered 20
