= Puerto Rico Highway 19 =

Highway in Puerto Rico

Highway 19
- Ruta 19
- Avenida Luis Vigoreaux

Route information
- Maintained by Puerto Rico DTPW
- Length: 2.0 km (1.2 mi)

Major junctions
- South end: PR-21 in Gobernador Piñero
- PR-17 in Gobernador Piñero
- North end: PR-2 in Pueblo Viejo

Location
- Country: United States
- Territory: Puerto Rico
- Municipalities: San Juan, Guaynabo

Highway system
- Roads in Puerto Rico; List
← PR-18	→ PR-20

Puerto Rico Highway 19 (PR-19) is a short highway in Guaynabo. It is the main avenue in San Patricio, Guaynabo. It begins at PR-20 and PR-21 in San Juan and ends an interchange with PR-2 and PR-20 in Guaynabo.

== Route description ==
PR-19 starts at its southern end at an interchange with PR-20 in San Juan. From this terminus, the highway runs through the interchange with PR-20 before intersecting PR-21 and turning northward parallel to the PR-20 freeway on its eastern side. After a short distance, the highway crosses the freeway on Avenida Luis Vigoreaux and then runs northwesterly to cross into Guaynabo. Running due north in Guaynabo, PR-19 passes through two roundabouts and ends at the interchange where PR-20 ends at PR-2.

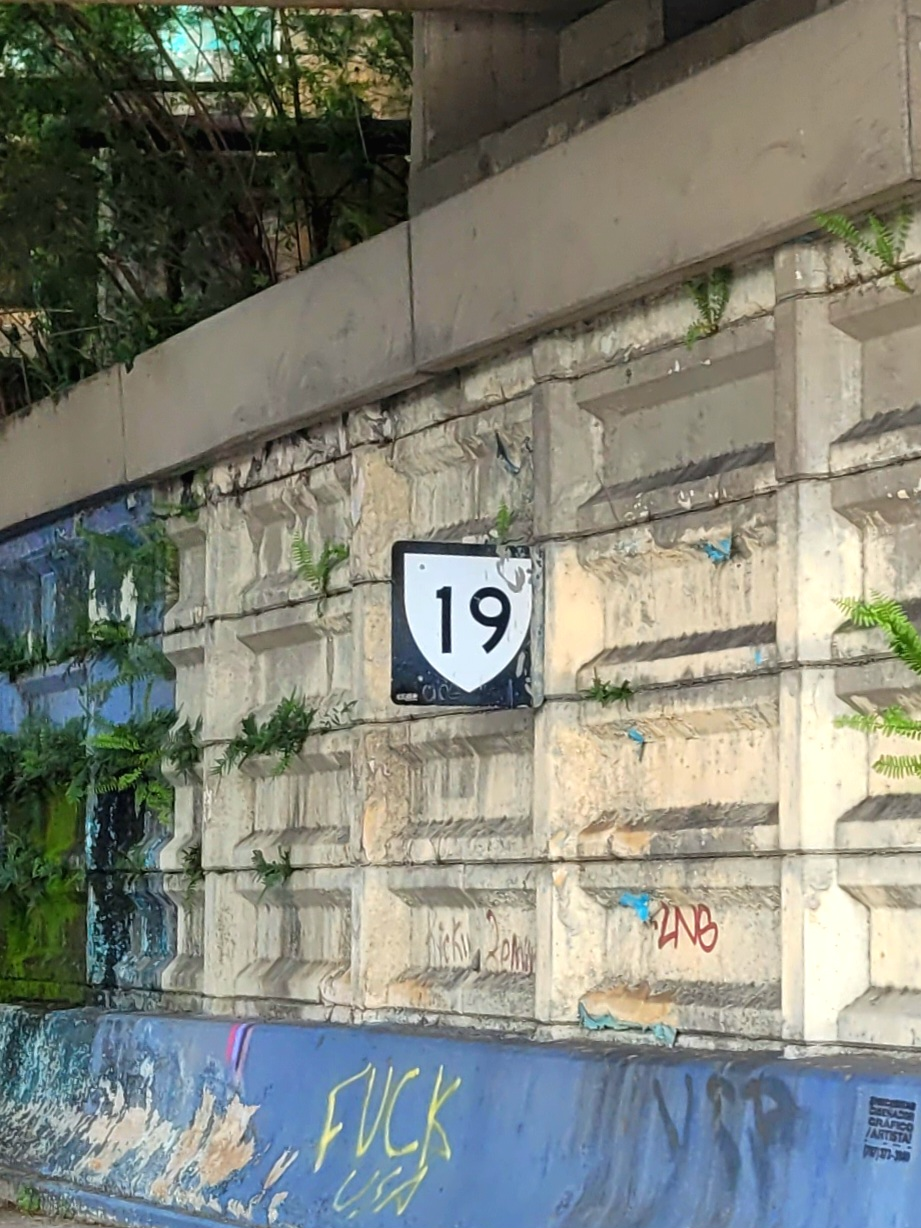
Puerto Rico Highway 19 north in San Juan

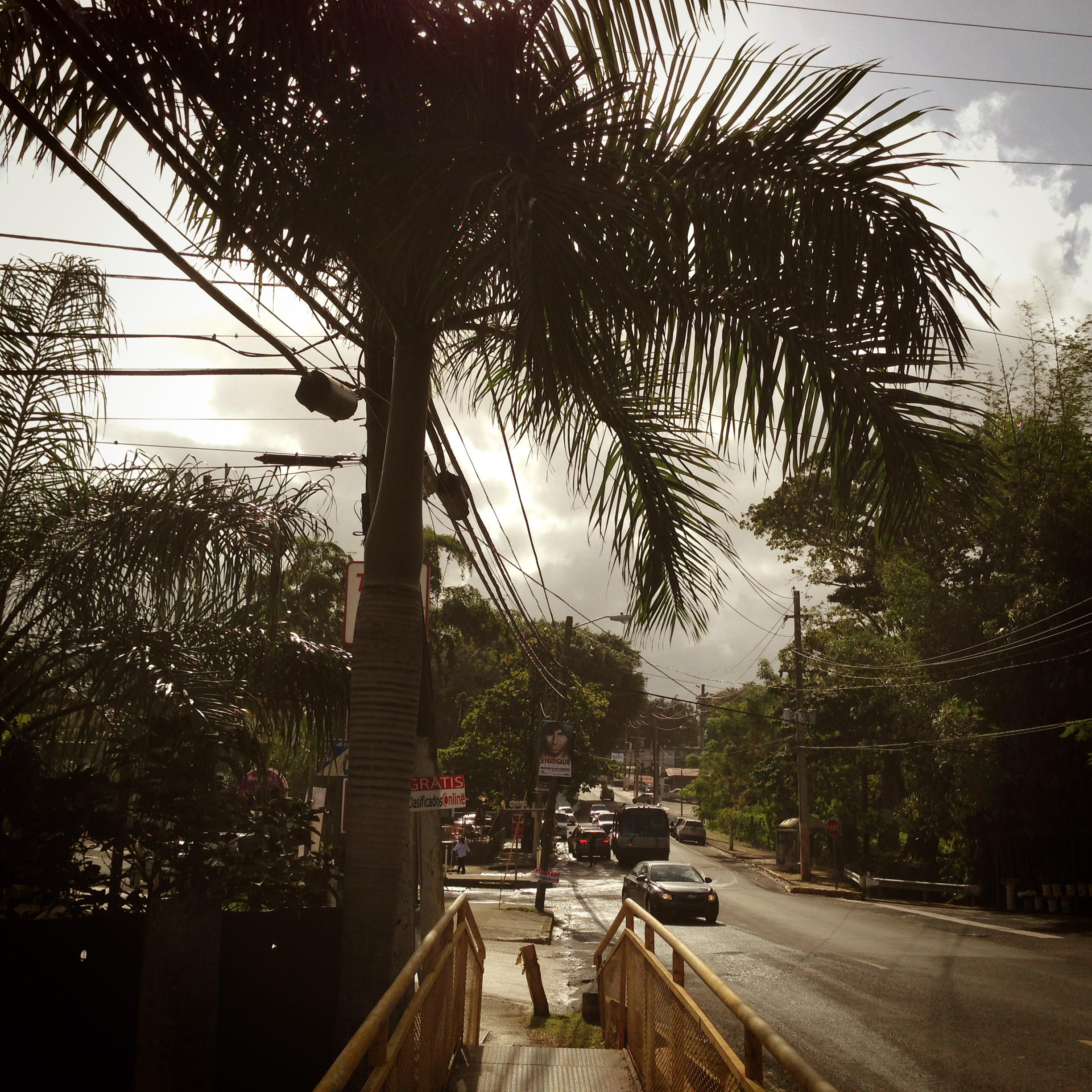
PR-19 south between Guaynabo and San Juan

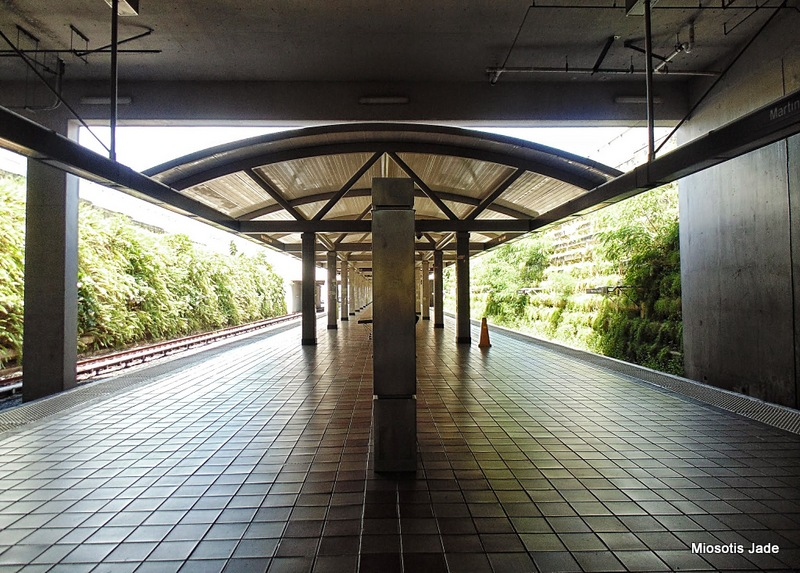
The Martínez Nadal train station in Guaynabo is off PR-19

== Major intersections ==
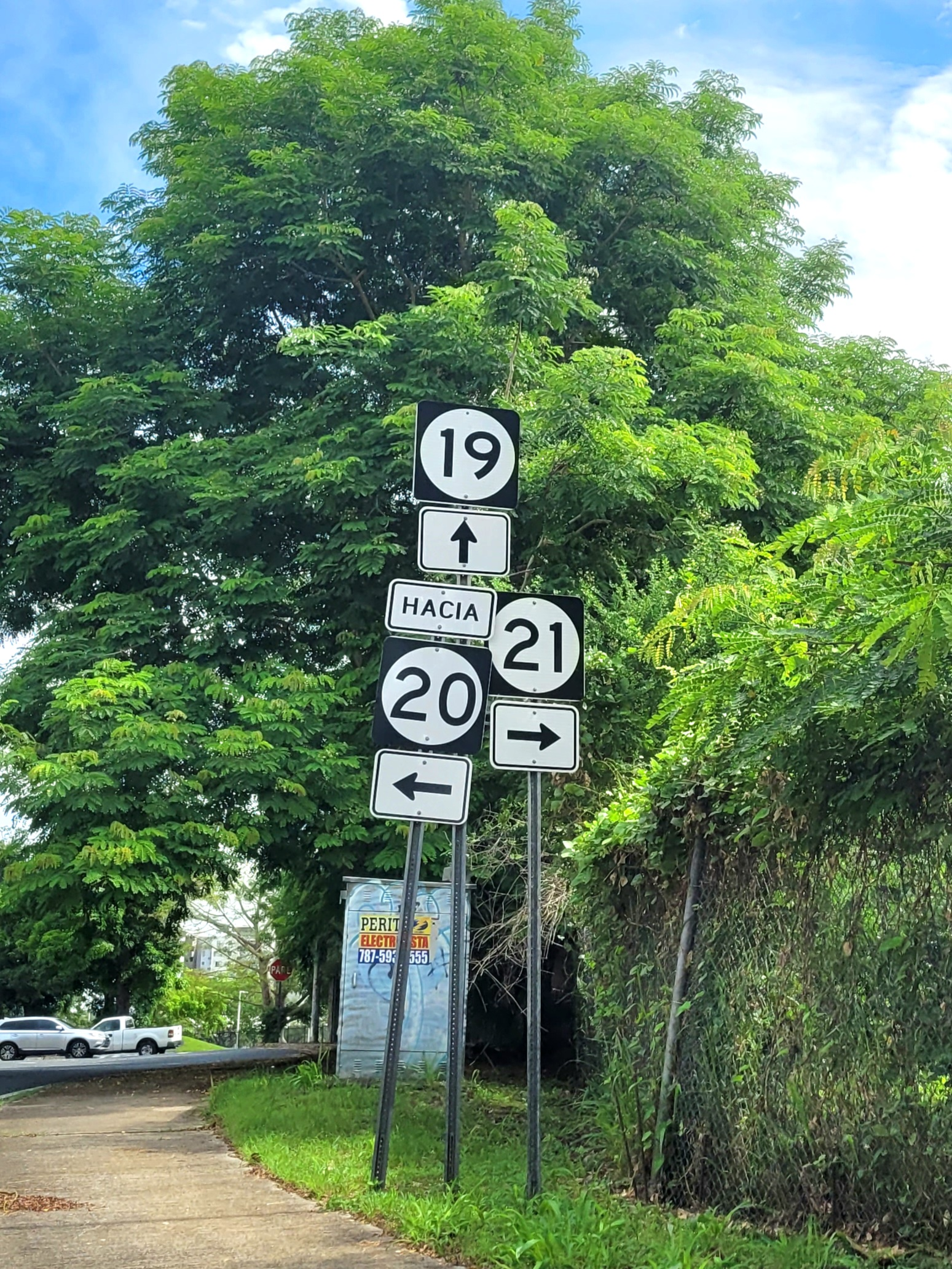
Signs for PR-19, PR-20 and PR-21 in Gobernador Piñero, San Juan

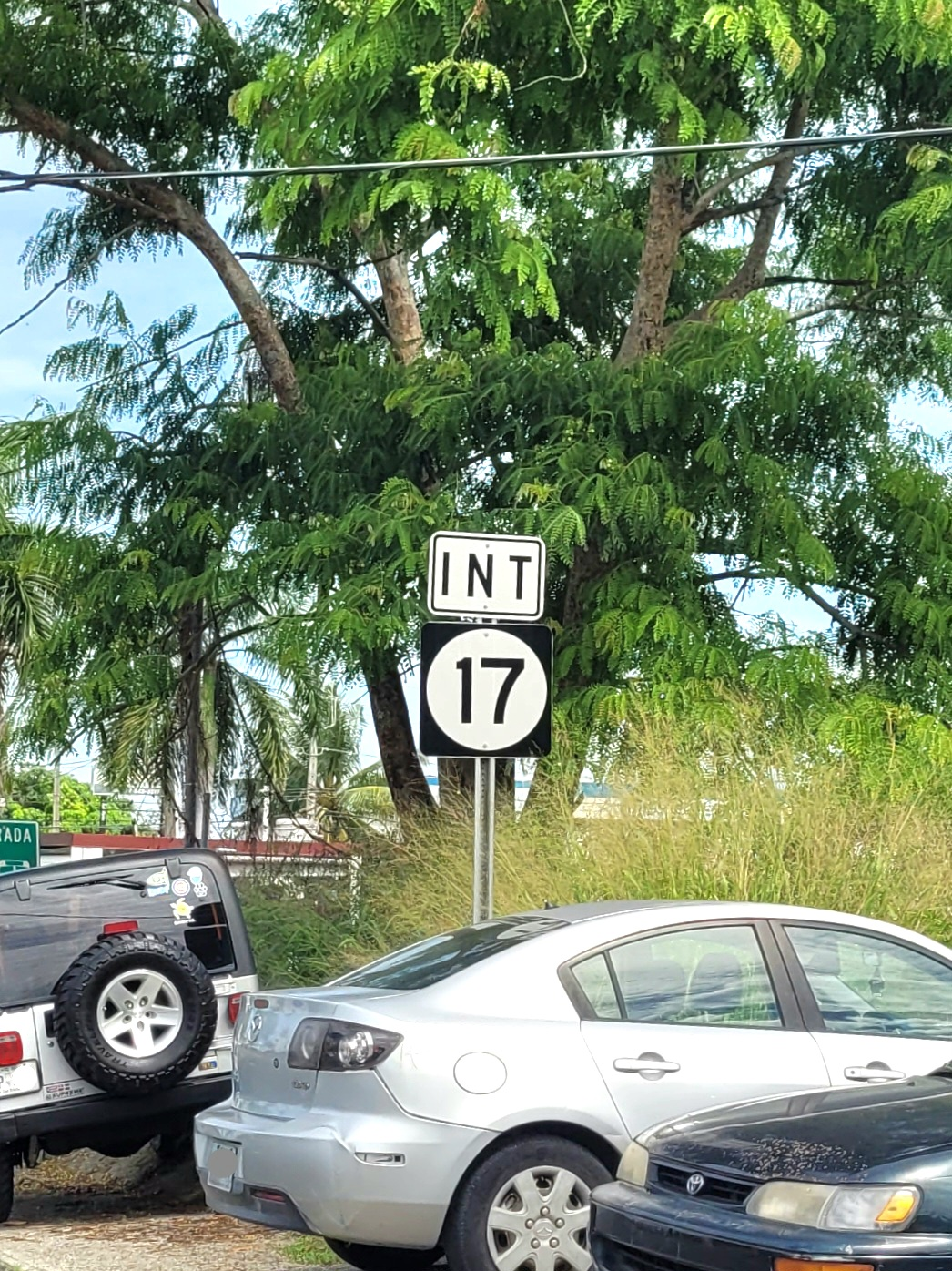
PR-19 north near PR-17 intersection in Gobernador Piñero, San Juan

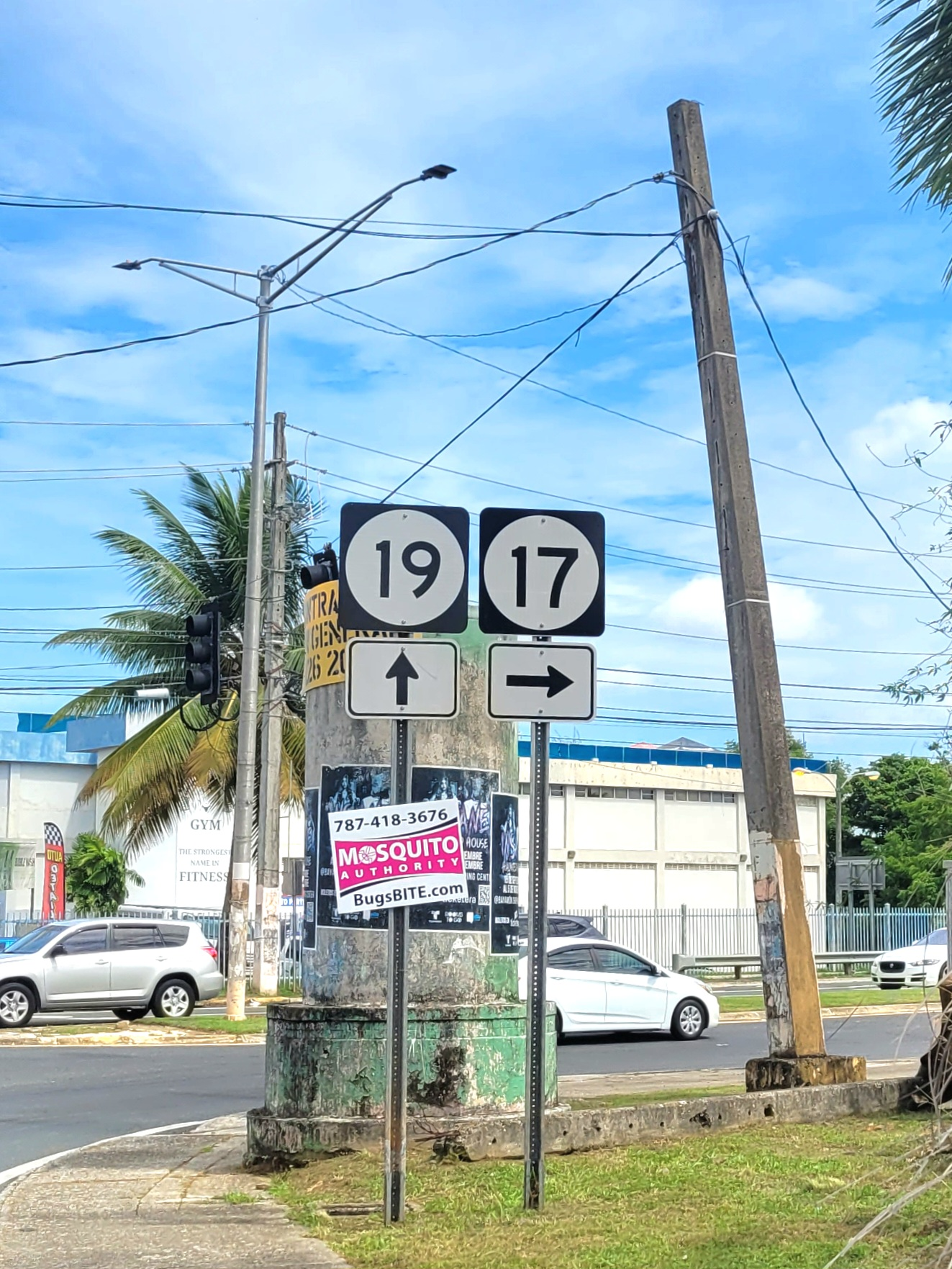
PR-19 north at the western terminus of PR-17 in Gobernador Piñero, San Juan

Municipality	Location	km	mi	Destinations	Notes
San Juan	Gobernador Piñero	2.0	1.2	PR-21 (Carretera Roberto Clemente Walker) to PR-20 south (Expreso Rafael Martínez Nadal) – Río Piedras, Guaynabo	Southern terminus of PR-19; no entrance ramp to PR-20 northbound
San Juan	Gobernador Piñero	1.6	0.99	PR-17 east (Avenida Jesús T. Piñero) to PR-20 (Expreso Rafael Martínez Nadal) – Río Piedras, Guaynabo	
Guaynabo	Pueblo Viejo	0.0	0.0	PR-2 east to PR-20 south (Expreso Rafael Martínez Nadal) – Guaynabo	Northern terminus of PR-19; PR-2 eastbound exit and PR-20 southbound entrance
1.000 mi = 1.609 km; 1.000 km = 0.621 mi: Incomplete access

== See also ==
- Luis Vigoreaux
