= List of highways numbered 20B =

The following highways are numbered 20B:

== New Zealand ==
- New Zealand State Highway 20B

== United States ==
- Nebraska Highway 20B (former)
- New York State Route 20B (former)
  - County Route 20B (Greene County, New York)
