= List of highways numbered 20A =

The following highways are numbered 20A:

== New Zealand ==
- New Zealand State Highway 20A

== United States ==
- U.S. Route 20A (New York)
  - U.S. Route 20A (Ohio)
- County Road 20A (Putnam County, Florida)
- Massachusetts Route 20A
- Nebraska Highway 20A (former)
  - Nebraska Link 20A
- New York State Route 20A (1930–1932) (former)
  - New York State Route 20A (1938–1939) (former)
