= Puerto Rico Highway 18 =

Highway in Puerto Rico

Highway 18
- Ruta 18
- Expreso Las Américas

Route information
- Maintained by Puerto Rico DTPW
- Length: 6.09 km (3.78 mi)
- Existed: 1961–present

Major junctions
- South end: PR-1 / PR-52 in Monacillo Urbano
- PR-21 in Monacillo Urbano; PR-17 in Gobernador Piñero; PR-23 in Hato Rey Norte
- North end: PR-22 in Hato Rey Norte

Location
- Country: United States
- Territory: Puerto Rico
- Municipalities: San Juan

Highway system
- Roads in Puerto Rico; List
← PR-17	→ PR-19

Puerto Rico Highway 18 (PR-18) is a freeway in Puerto Rico, which is also known as Expreso Las Américas. It runs from its north end at its intersection with PR-22 (known as Expreso José de Diego) in San Juan to its south end in Río Piedras where it intersects with PR-1. At this point PR-18 becomes PR-52, known as Autopista Luis A. Ferré.

== Route description ==
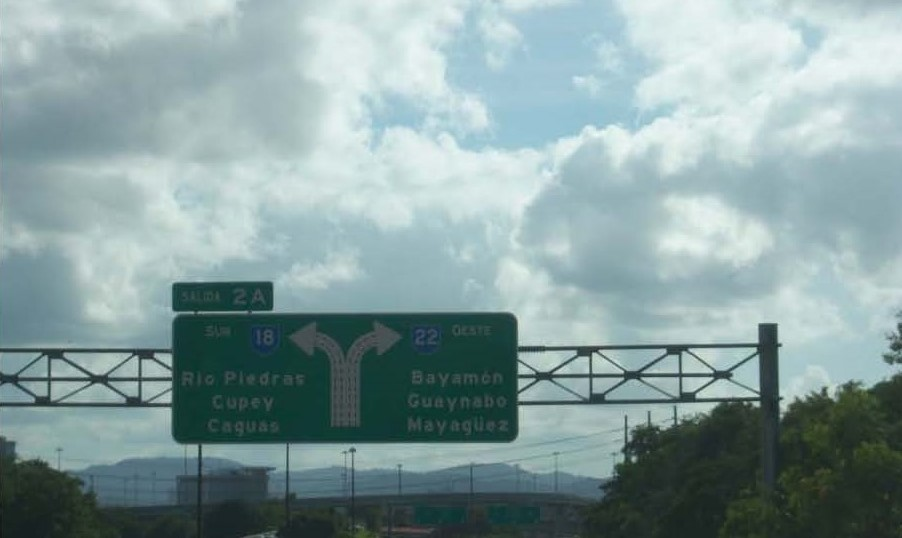
Sign for Exit 2A on PR-22

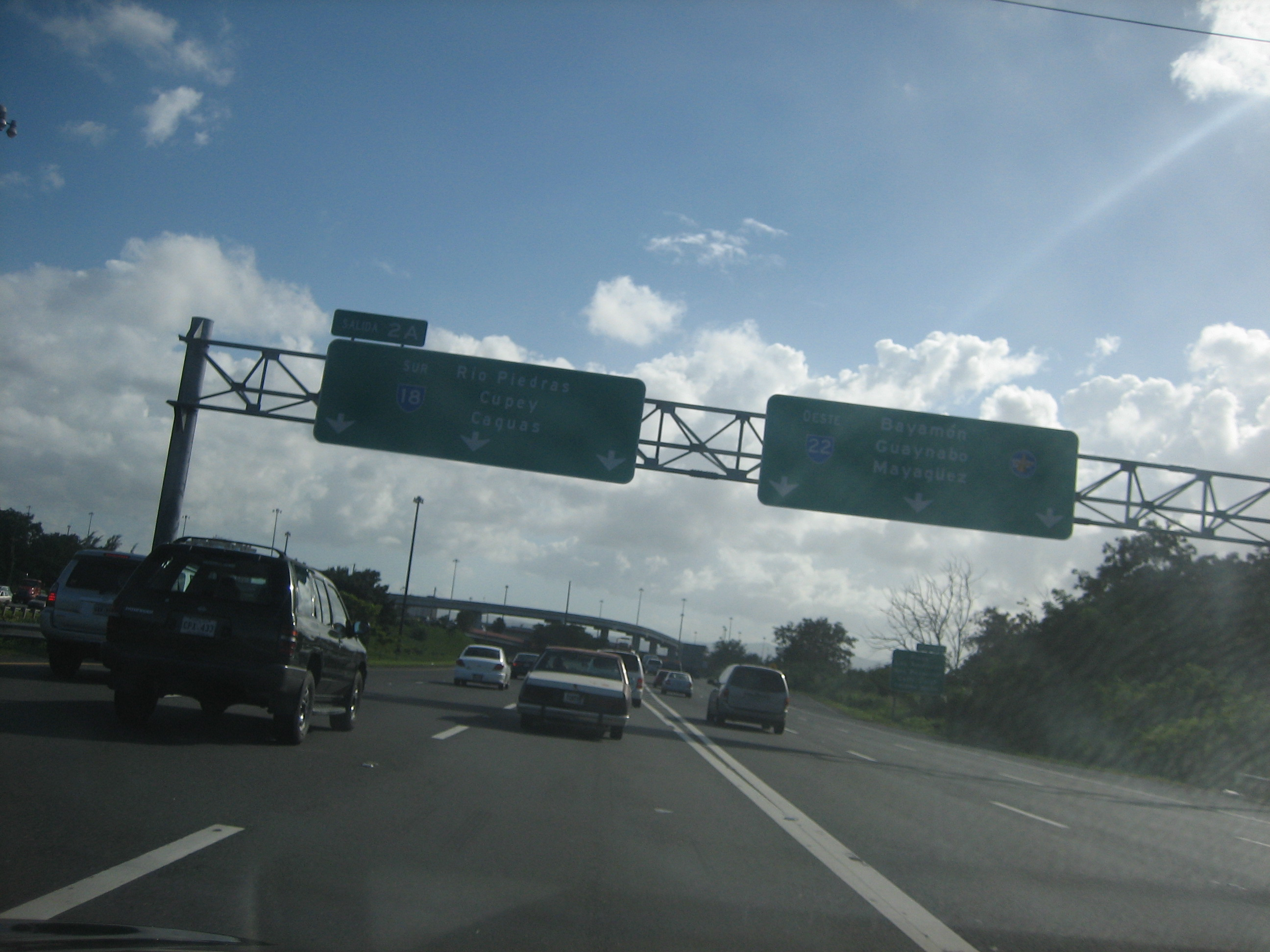
Southbound beginning of PR-18 at PR-22 interchange in Hato Rey Norte barrio

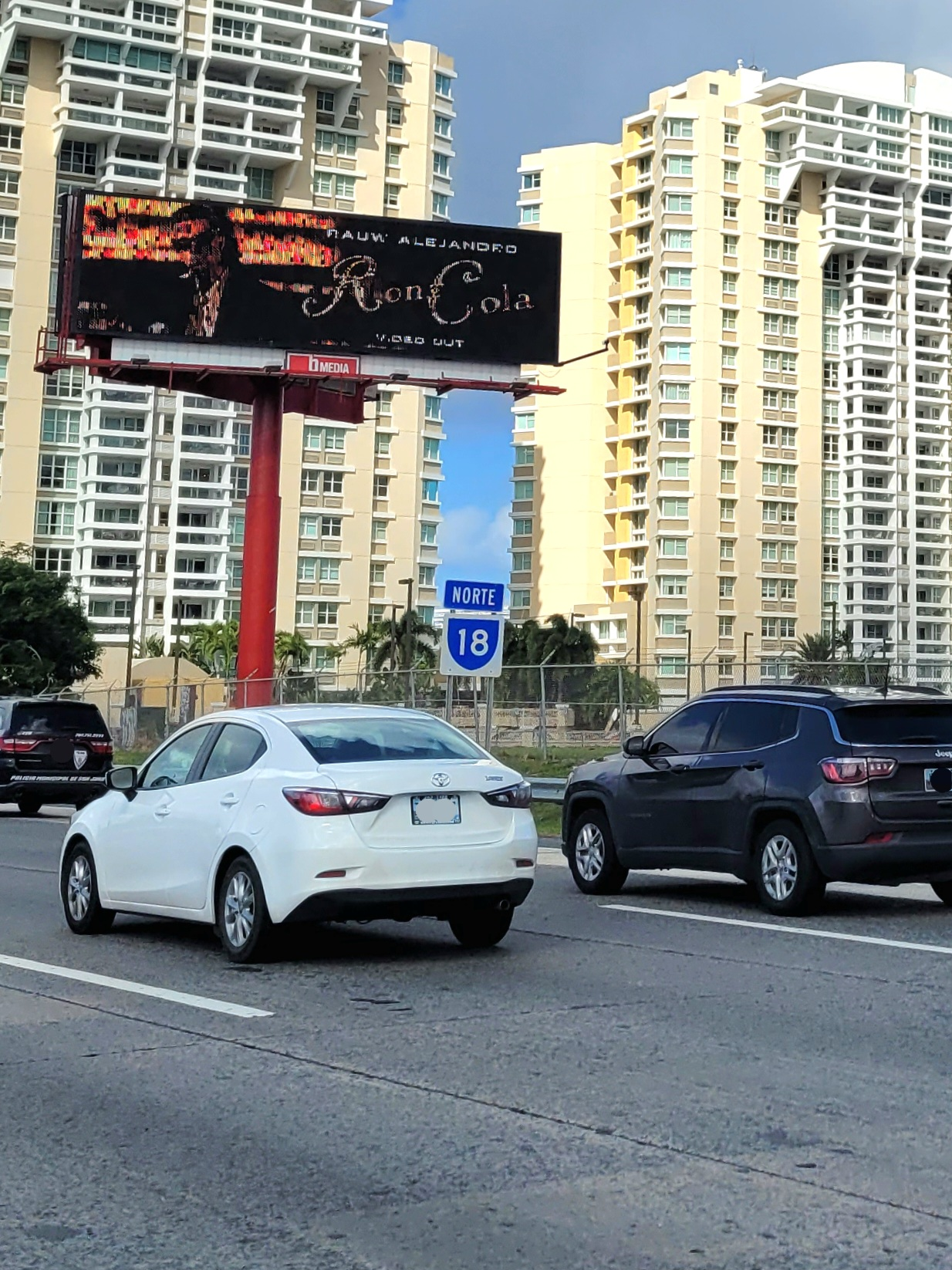
PR-18 north in Hato Rey Norte barrio

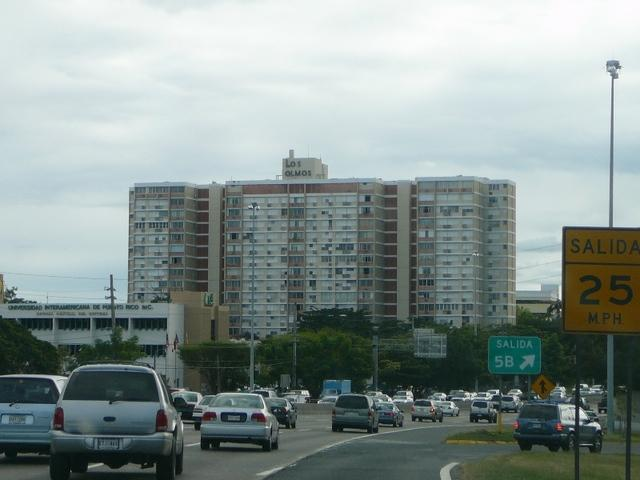
PR-18 south in Gobernador Piñero barrio

PR-18 connects PR-52 to PR-22 and intersects with Jesús de Piñero Avenue (PR-17), Franklin Delano Roosevelt Avenue (PR-23), which grants access to Plaza Las Américas, and Domenech Avenue. It is mostly a 4-lane road in each direction. The combined route of PR-18 and PR-52 is coterminous with the unsigned Interstate Highway PRI-1.

== Exit list ==
The entire route is located in San Juan.

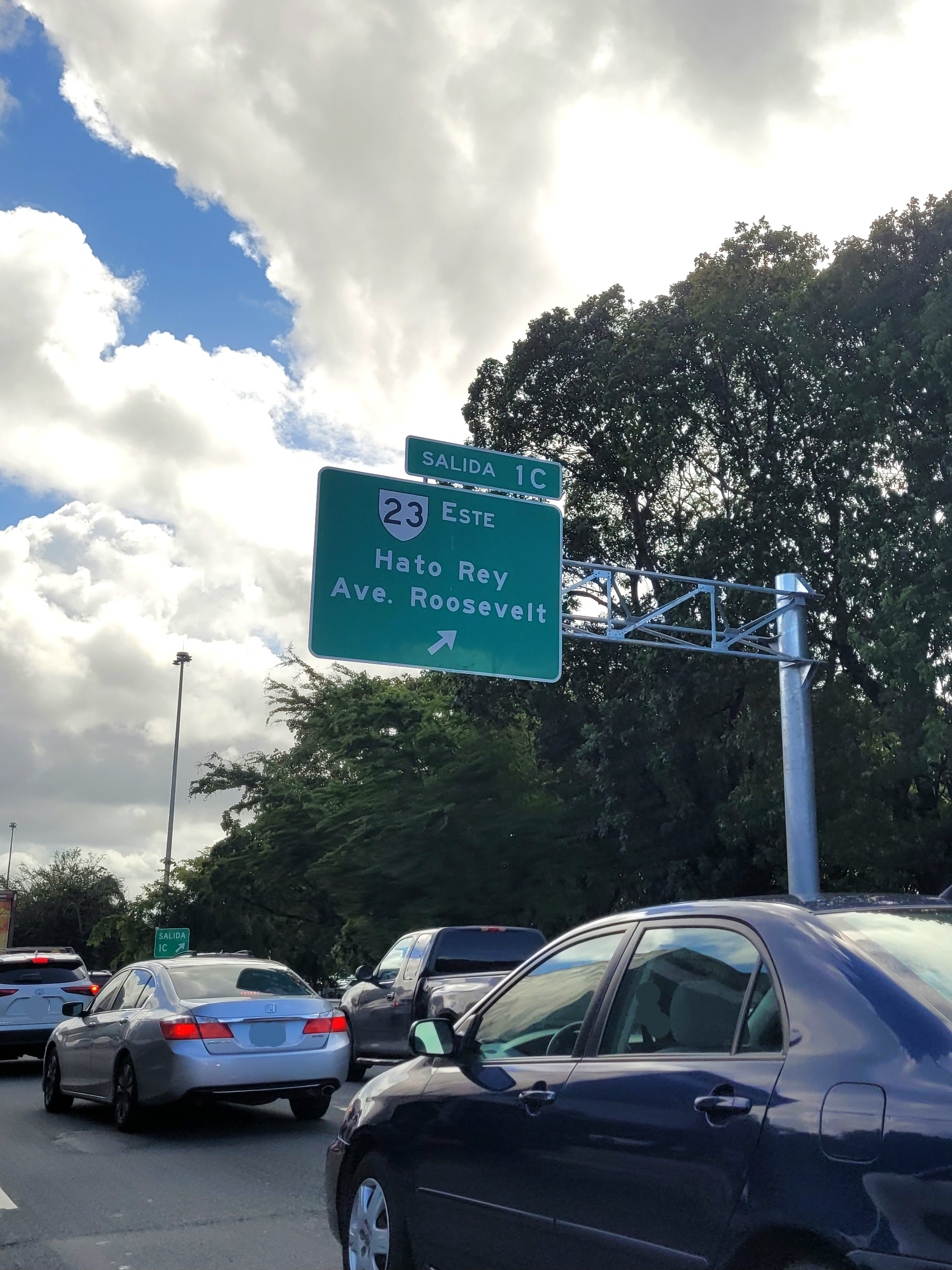
PR-18 south at exit 1C to PR-23 east in Hato Rey Norte barrio

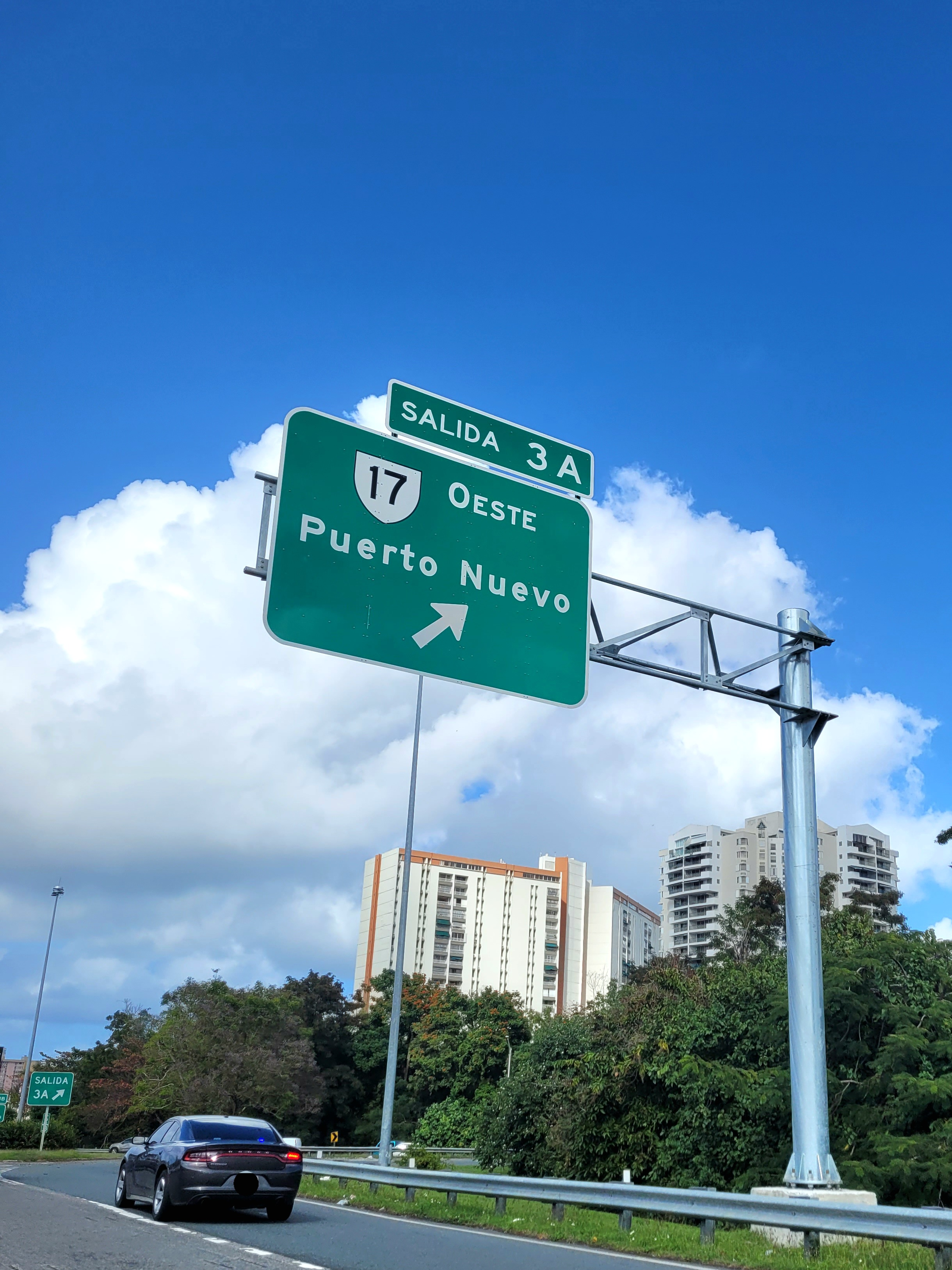
PR-18 north at exit 3A to PR-17 west in Gobernador Piñero barrio

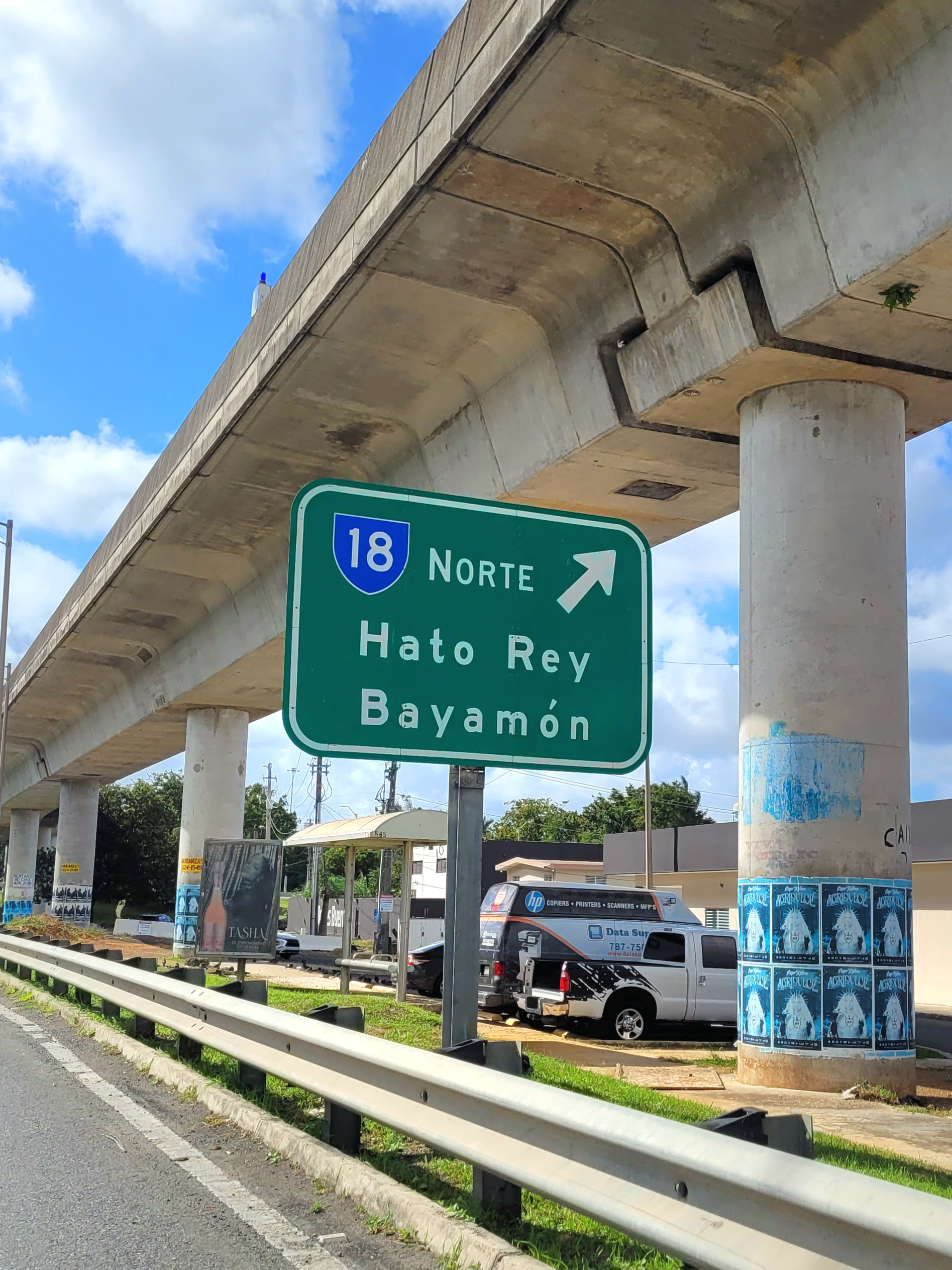
PR-21 west at its interchange with PR-18 north in Monacillo Urbano barrio

Location	km	mi	Exit	Destinations	Notes
Monacillo Urbano	6.09	3.78	8B	PR-52 south (PRI-1 / Autopista Luis A. Ferré) – Caguas, Cupey, Ponce	Southern terminus of PR-18; PRI-1 continues southbound via PR-52.
Monacillo Urbano	5.9	3.7	8A	PR-1 south – Caguas, Caimito	No southbound access to PR-1 north.
Monacillo Urbano	4.7	2.9	7B	PR-21 east (Avenida Ingeniero José "Kiko" Custodio) – Río Piedras, Cupey	No northbound exit.
Monacillo Urbano	4.5	2.8	7A	PR-21 west (Avenida Ingeniero José "Kiko" Custodio) – Monacillo, Guaynabo, Hospital de Veteranos	Access to Centro Médico station
El Cinco	4.2	2.6	6B	PR-Río Piedras Medical Center	Most direct access to the hospital; southbound only.
El Cinco	3.5	2.2	6A	PR-Avenida Américo Miranda – Río Piedras Medical Center	
Gobernador Piñero	2.7	1.7	5B	PR-17 east (Avenida Jesús T. Piñero) – Carolina, Luis Muñoz Marín International Airport, Trujillo Alto, Río Piedras	Access to The Mall of San Juan and Piñero station
Gobernador Piñero	2.4	1.5	5A	PR-17 west (Avenida Jesús T. Piñero) – Puerto Nuevo	
Hato Rey Norte	2.0	1.2	4	PR-Avenida Manuel Domenech – Hato Rey	Access to Hospital del Maestro and Domenech station
Hato Rey Norte	1.5– 0.5	0.93– 0.31	3A–C	PR-23 (Avenida Franklin Delano Roosevelt) / PR-Calle Carlos F. Chardón / PR-Calle Juan Calaf – Puerto Nuevo, Hato Rey	Frontage roads of these exits has an at-grade intersection in Chardon Street; Access to Plaza Las Américas shopping mall and Roosevelt station
Hato Rey Norte	0.0	0.0	0	PR-22 (PRI-2 / Autopista José de Diego) – Guaynabo, Bayamón, Arecibo, Santurce, San Juan, Carolina	Northern terminus of PR-18 and PRI-1; PR-22 exit 2A; access to Fernando Luis Ribas Dominicci Airport
1.000 mi = 1.609 km; 1.000 km = 0.621 mi: Incomplete access; Route transition

== See also ==
- Interstate Highways in Puerto Rico
