= Puerto Nuevo (Hato Rey) =

Barrio of San Juan, Puerto Rico

Coordinates: 18.4316942°N 66.0881450°W

- Subbarrio
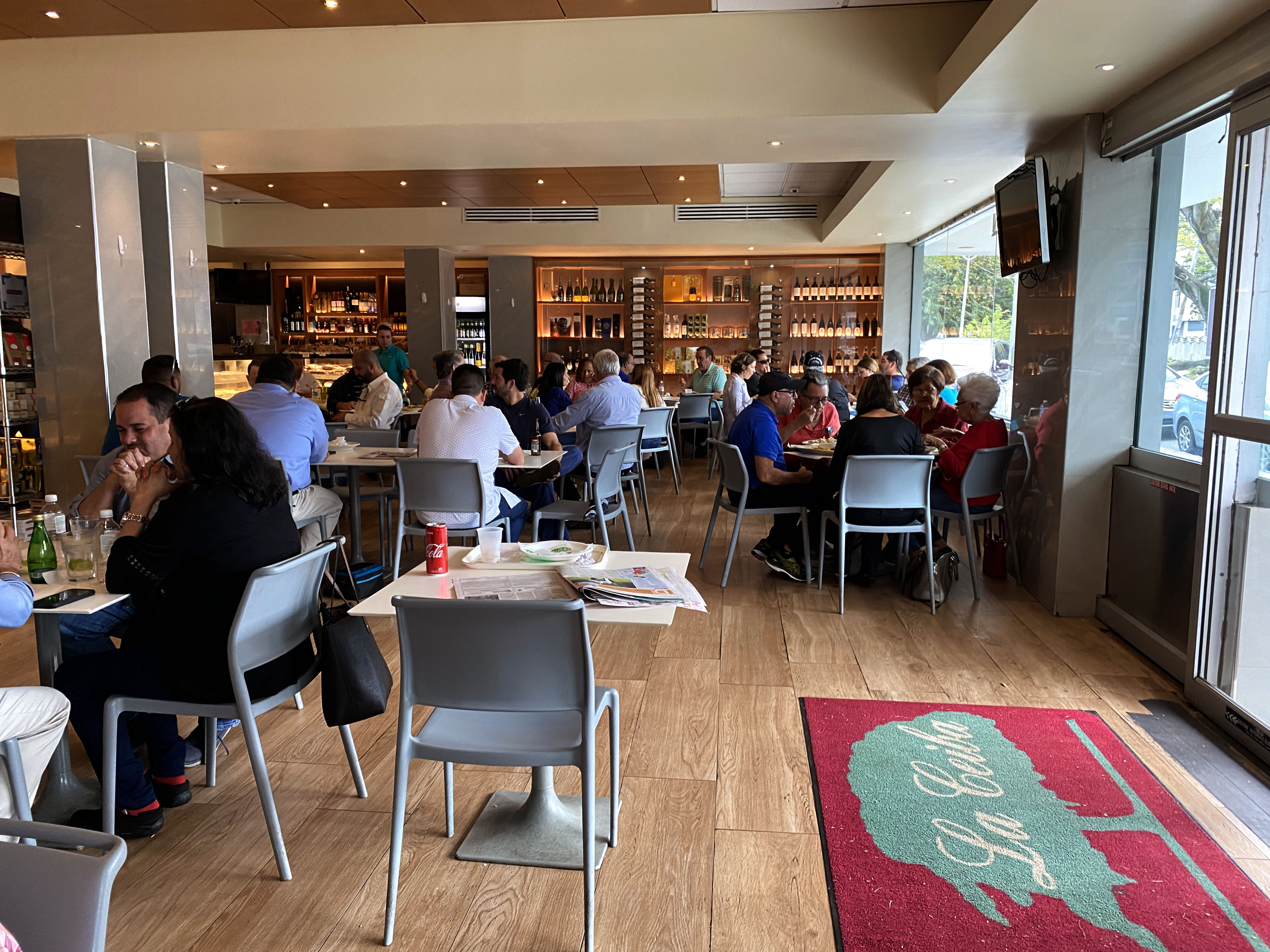
- Patrons at La Ceiba in Puerto Nuevo
- Interactive map of Puerto Nuevo
- Commonwealth: Puerto Rico
- Municipality: San Juan

Government
  - Type: Municipality of San Juan

Area
  - Total: 3.9 km^{2} (1.52 sq mi)

Population
  - Total: 3,646
- Source: 2000 United States census

Puerto Nuevo is one of the 12 subbarrios of Hato Rey. It is home to the Academia Bautista de Puerto Nuevo.
