= Puerto Rico Highway 177 =

Highway in Puerto Rico

Highway 177
- Ruta 177
- Avenida Lomas Verdes

Route information
- Maintained by Puerto Rico DTPW
- Length: 10.4 km (6.5 mi)

Major junctions
- West end: PR-174 in Minillas–Juan Sánchez
- PR-889 in Juan Sánchez; PR-833 in Frailes; PR-20 in Frailes; PR-8177 in Frailes; PR-841 in Frailes; PR-838 in Monacillo Urbano–Monacillo; PR-1 in Monacillo–Monacillo Urbano; PR-8838 in Monacillo Urbano; PR-52 in Monacillo Urbano; PR-8176 in Cupey
- East end: PR-176 in Cupey

Location
- Country: United States
- Territory: Puerto Rico
- Municipalities: Bayamón, Guaynabo, San Juan

Highway system
- Roads in Puerto Rico; List
← PR-176	→ PR-178
← PR-8176	PR-8177	→ PR-8834

Puerto Rico Highway 177 (PR-177) is a main highway connecting the area of Cupey, San Juan, Puerto Rico to Bayamón, Puerto Rico. It passes through Guaynabo in the area known as Torrimar. It is divided in all of its length. In Bayamón, it ends in the intersection to Puerto Rico Highway 174 and Main Road, which connects to Puerto Rico Highway 2. In Cupey, it ends at Puerto Rico Highway 176.

Puerto Rico Highway 177

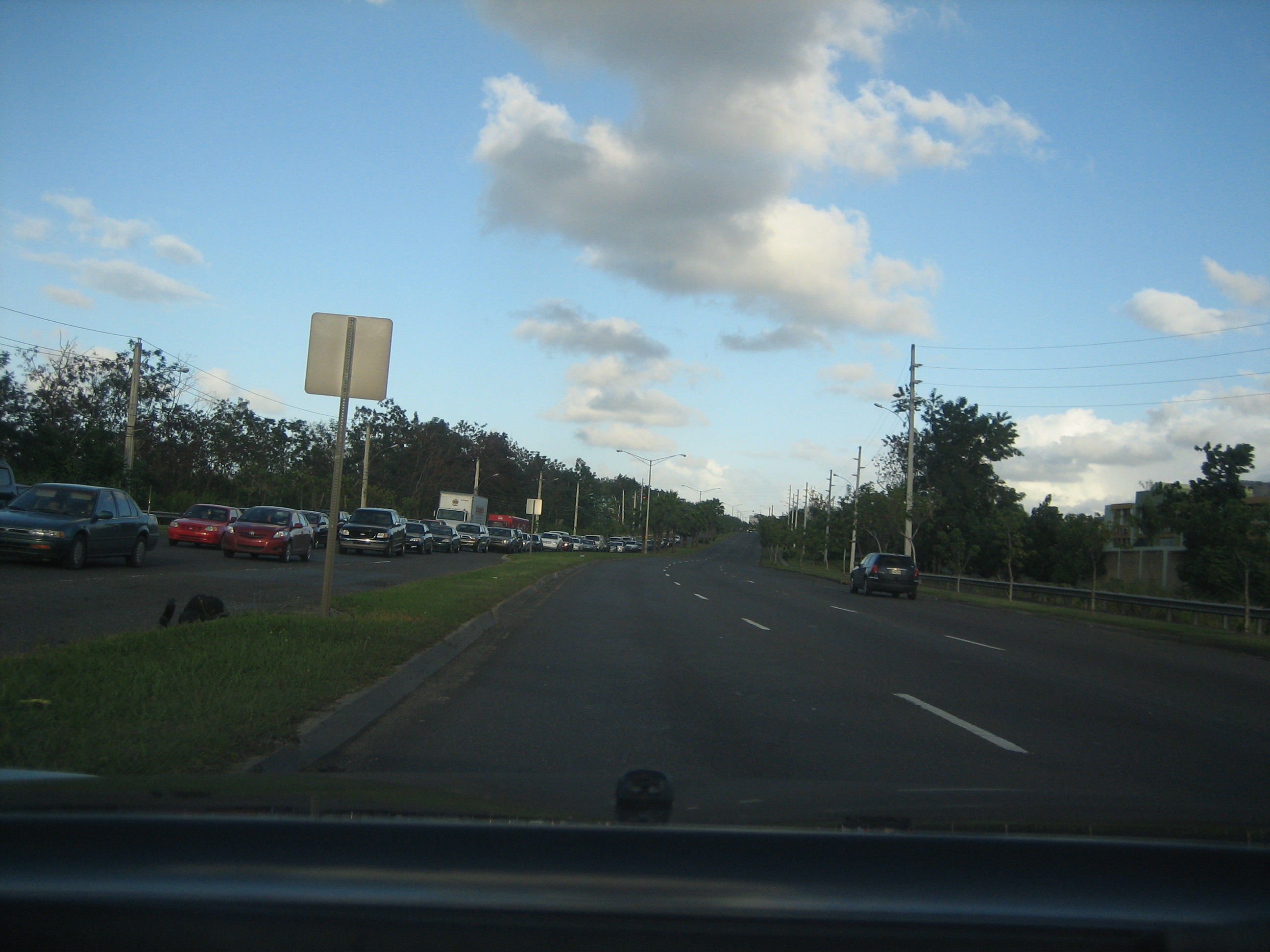
Heading east from Bayamón to Torrimar, Guaynabo

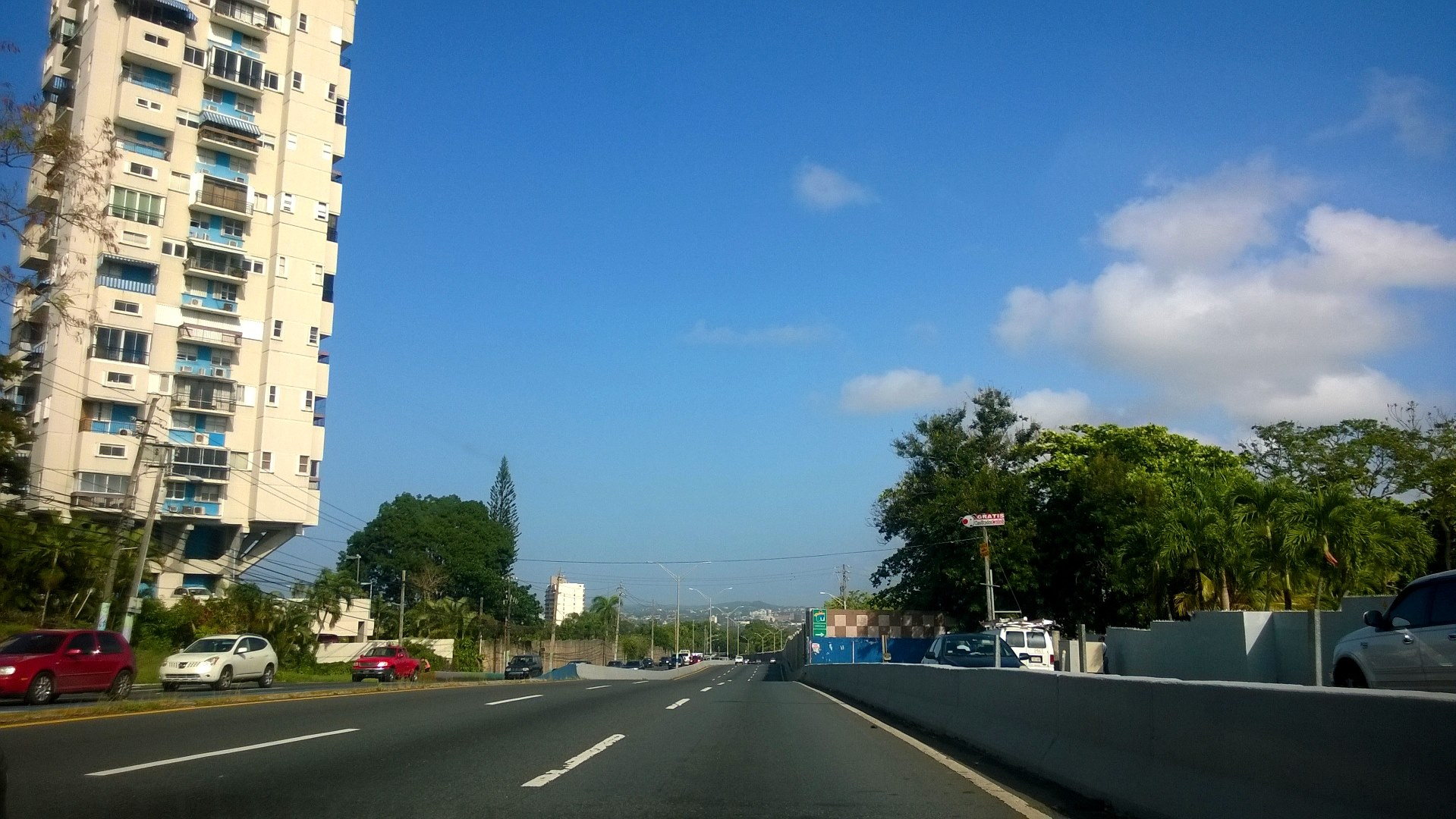
Heading west in Torrimar, Guaynabo

== Major intersections ==
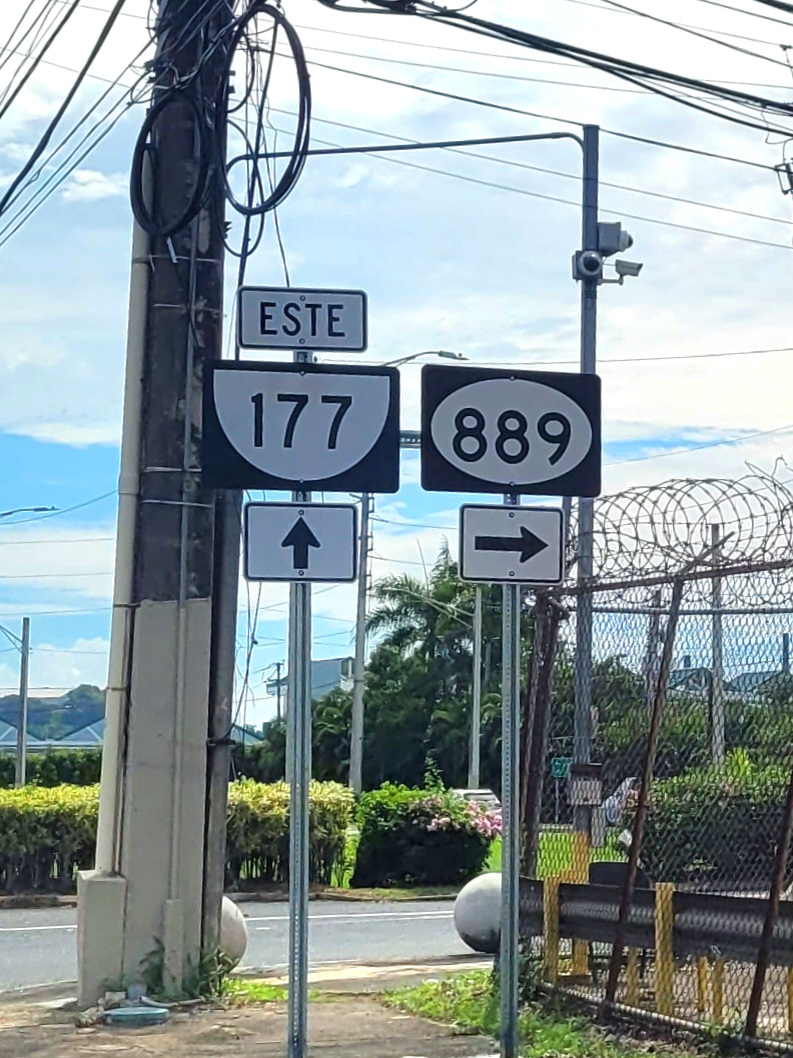
PR-177 east at PR-889 intersection in Juan Sánchez, Bayamón

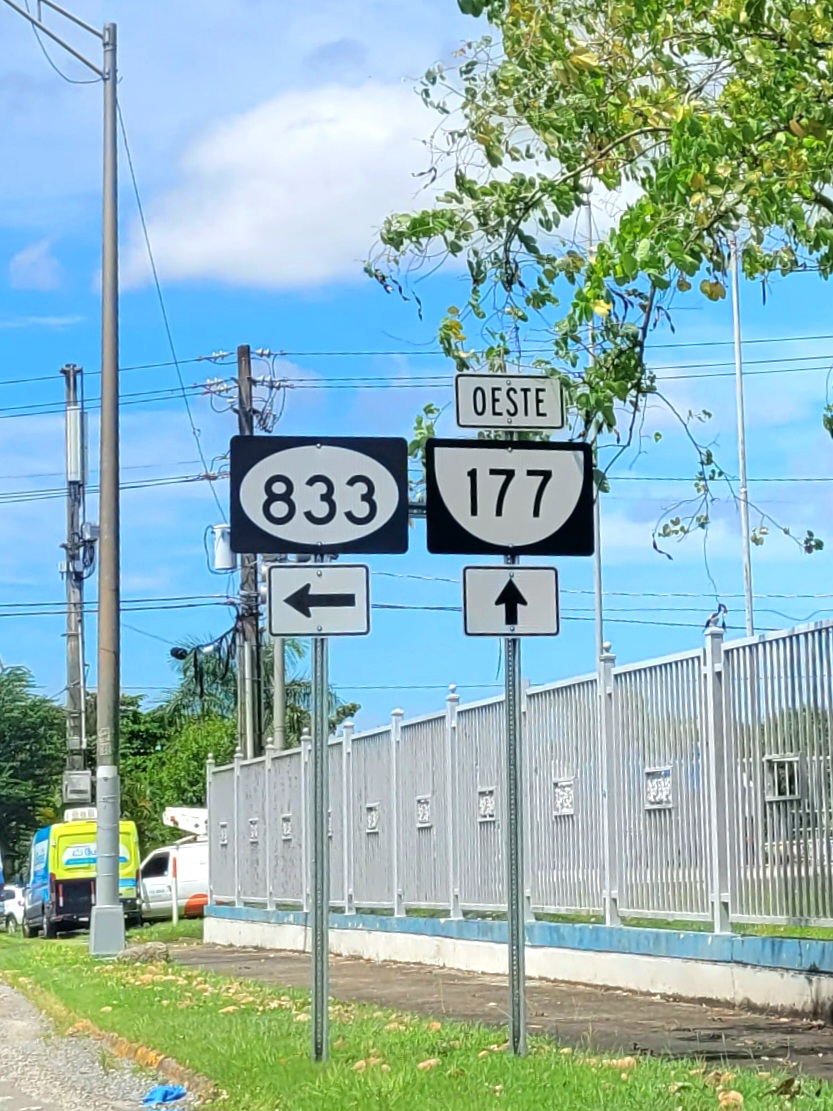
PR-177 west at PR-833 intersection in Frailes, Guaynabo

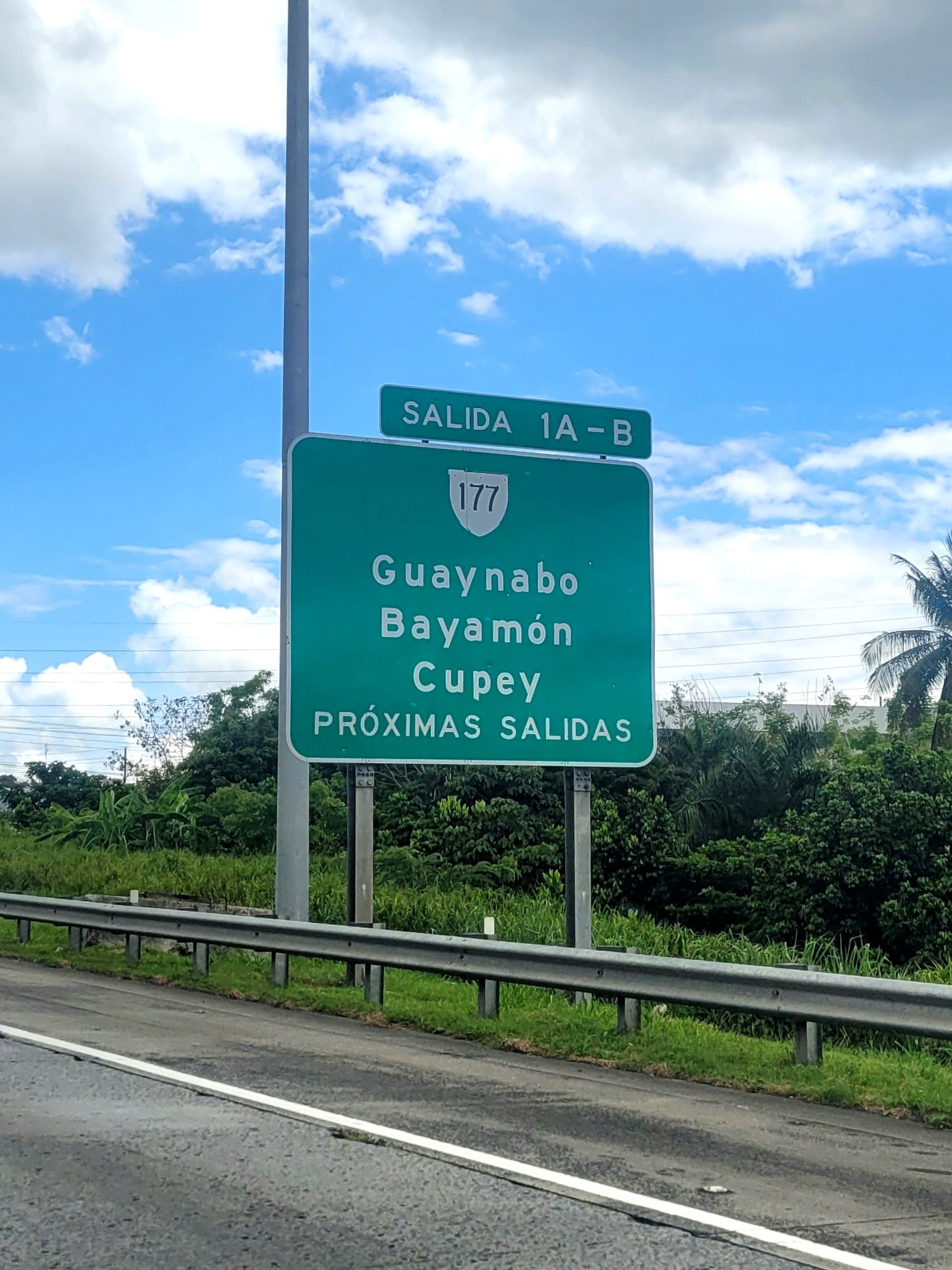
PR-52 south approaching exits 1A-B to PR-177 in Monacillo Urbano, San Juan

Municipality	Location	km	mi	Destinations	Notes
Bayamón	Minillas–Juan Sánchez line	0.0	0.0	PR-174 to PR-2 / PR-Avenida Main – Bayamón, Aguas Buenas	Western terminus of PR-177
Bayamón	Juan Sánchez	0.4	0.25	PR-889 – Aguas Buenas	
Bayamón	Juan Sánchez	1.0	0.62	PR-Avenida Los Filtros – Bayamón	
Bayamón	Juan Sánchez	1.9– 2.0	1.2– 1.2	PR-Avenida Norte – Frailes	Diamond interchange
Guaynabo	Frailes	2.8	1.7	PR-Avenida Santa Ana / PR-Bulevar Ramírez de Arellano – Guaynabo	
Guaynabo	Frailes	3.4	2.1	PR-833 – Los Filtros	
Guaynabo	Frailes	3.8	2.4	PR-20 (Expreso Rafael Martínez Nadal) – Guaynabo, San Juan	Partial cloverleaf interchange
San Juan	No major junctions				
Guaynabo	Frailes	4.6	2.9	PR-8177 (Carretera Santiago Iglesias Pantín) – Guaynabo	
Guaynabo	Frailes	5.3	3.3	PR-841 (Calle San Ignacio) – Monacillo	
San Juan	Monacillo Urbano–Monacillo line	6.5	4.0	PR-838 (Camino Alejandrino) – Guaynabo	
San Juan	Monacillo Urbano–Monacillo line	7.1– 7.2	4.4– 4.5	PR-1 (Carretera Felipe "La Voz" Rodríguez) – Río Piedras, Caguas	Partial cloverleaf interchange
San Juan	Monacillo Urbano	8.0	5.0	PR-8838 – Monacillo Urbano	
San Juan	Monacillo Urbano	8.4	5.2	PR-52 (Autopista Luis A. Ferré) – San Juan, Caguas, Ponce	PR-52 exits 1, 1A and 1B; partial cloverleaf interchange
San Juan	Cupey	10.3	6.4	PR-8176 (Calle Santa Águeda) – Cupey	
San Juan	Cupey	10.4	6.5	PR-176 (Avenida Ingeniero Víctor M. Labiosa) – Río Piedras, Trujillo Alto	Eastern terminus of PR-177
1.000 mi = 1.609 km; 1.000 km = 0.621 mi

== Related route ==
Highway 8177
- Location: Guaynabo – San Juan
- Length: 0.80 km (0.50 mi; 2,600 ft)

Puerto Rico Highway 8177 (PR-8177) is a road parallel to PR-177 on the Guaynabo–San Juan municipal line. The entire highway is on the Frailes–Monacillo Urbano line.

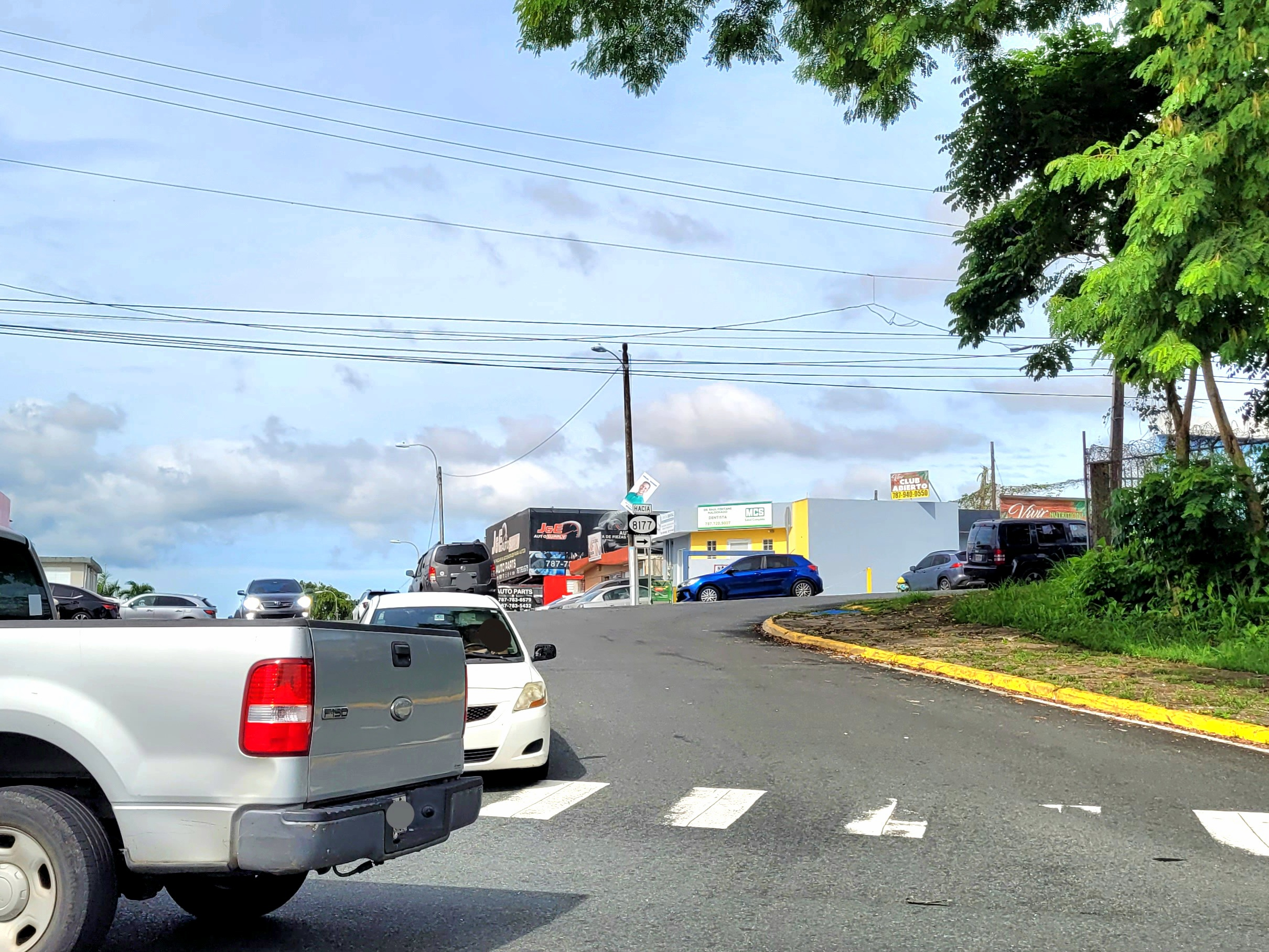
PR-8177 between Guaynabo and San Juan

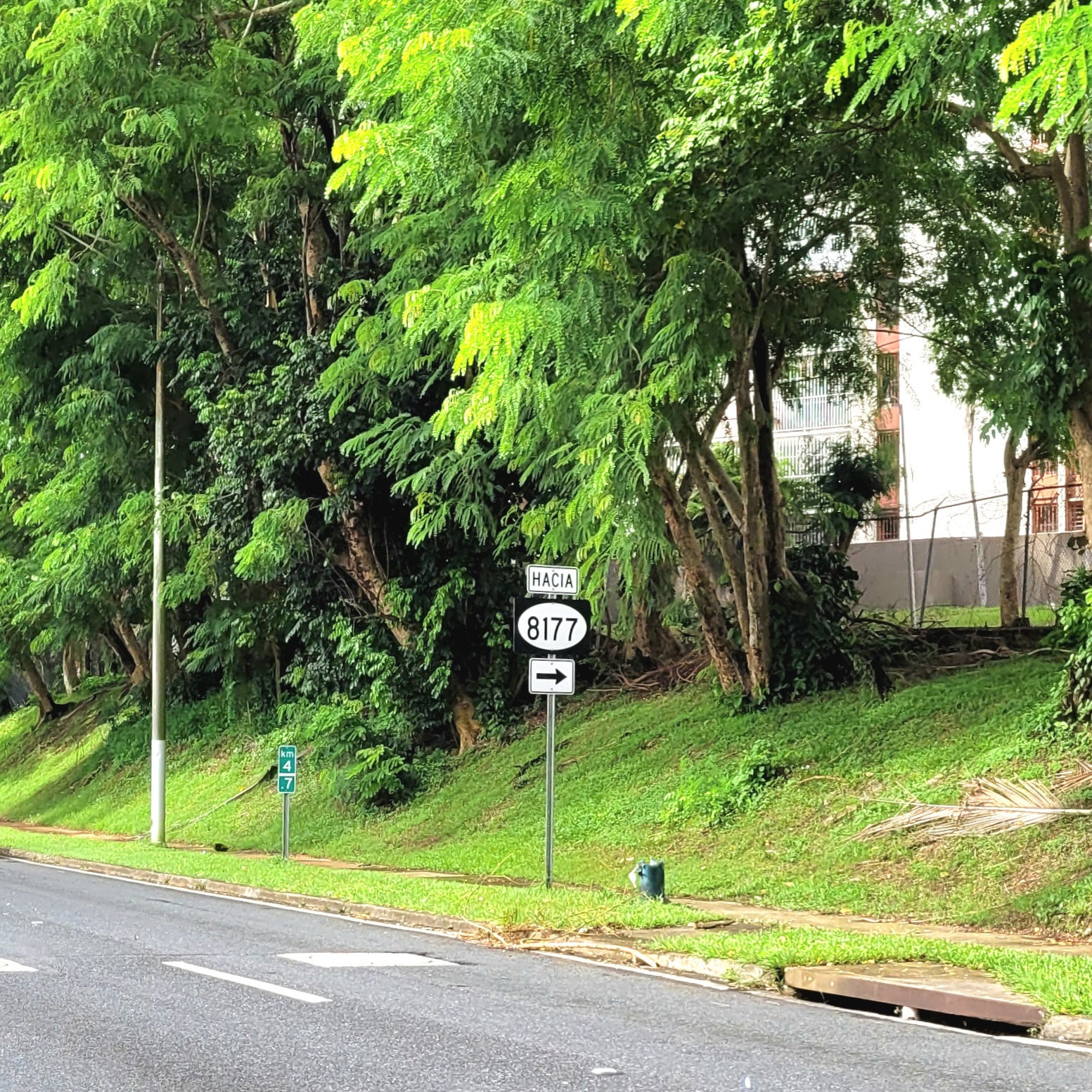
PR-177 west near PR-8177 intersection in Frailes, Guaynabo

km	mi	Destinations	Notes
0.80	0.50	PR-177	Western terminus of PR-8177; access to Guaynabo and Bayamón; unsigned
0.00	0.00	PR-841	Eastern terminus of PR-8177; access to PR-177, Río Piedras and San Juan
1.000 mi = 1.609 km; 1.000 km = 0.621 mi
