= Puerto Rico Highway 52 =

Highway in Puerto Rico

Highway 52
- Ruta 52
- Autopista Luis A. Ferré
- PR-52 highlighted in red

Route information
- Maintained by Metropistas
- Length: 108.5 km (67.4 mi)
- Existed: 1968–present

Major junctions
- South end: PR-2 / PR-9 in Canas
- PR-12 in Playa; PR-1 in Vayas; PR-10 in Sabanetas; PR-149 in Amuelas; PR-153 in Felicia 2; PR-1 in Lapa; PR-53 in Lapa; PR-184 in Beatriz; PR-1 / PR-30 in Bairoa; PR-199 in Monacillo
- North end: PR-1 / PR-18 in Monacillo Urbano

Location
- Country: United States
- Territory: Puerto Rico
- Municipalities: Ponce, Juana Díaz, Santa Isabel, Salinas, Cayey, Caguas, Trujillo Alto, San Juan

Highway system
- Roads in Puerto Rico; List
← PR-47	→ PR-53

Puerto Rico Highway 52 (PR-52), a major toll road in Puerto Rico, is also known as Autopista Luis A. Ferré. It was formerly called Expreso Las Américas. It runs from PR-1 in southwest Río Piedras and heads south until it intersects with highway PR-2 in Ponce. PR-52 is Puerto Rico's longest and second most traveled tollway. The road is mostly a 2-lane road in each direction. Toll stations are located in San Juan, Caguas, Salinas, Juana Díaz, and Ponce. The speed limit from San Juan to Caguas is 55 miles per hour (89 km/h). From Caguas to Salinas, it is 45 miles per hour (72 km/h), and from Salinas to Ponce, it is 65 miles per hour (105 km/h).

== Route description ==
At its north end, the short PR-18 continues from north to south along PR-52 towards Hato Rey and Santurce. This short segment is known as Expreso Las Américas, the only segment of the route still unofficially bearing this name, since PR-18 is now officially named Roberto Sánchez Vilella Expressway. The combined route of PR-18 and PR-52 runs concurrent with the unsigned US Interstate Highway PRI-1. PR-52 continues southward along Cupey and Caimito, crossing the westernmost edge of the Sierra de Luquillo in Trujillo Alto on the way to Caguas. In Caguas, it crosses the Valley of Caguas, where it functions as a north-south bypass for local traffic, before elevating south into the Sierra de Cayey.

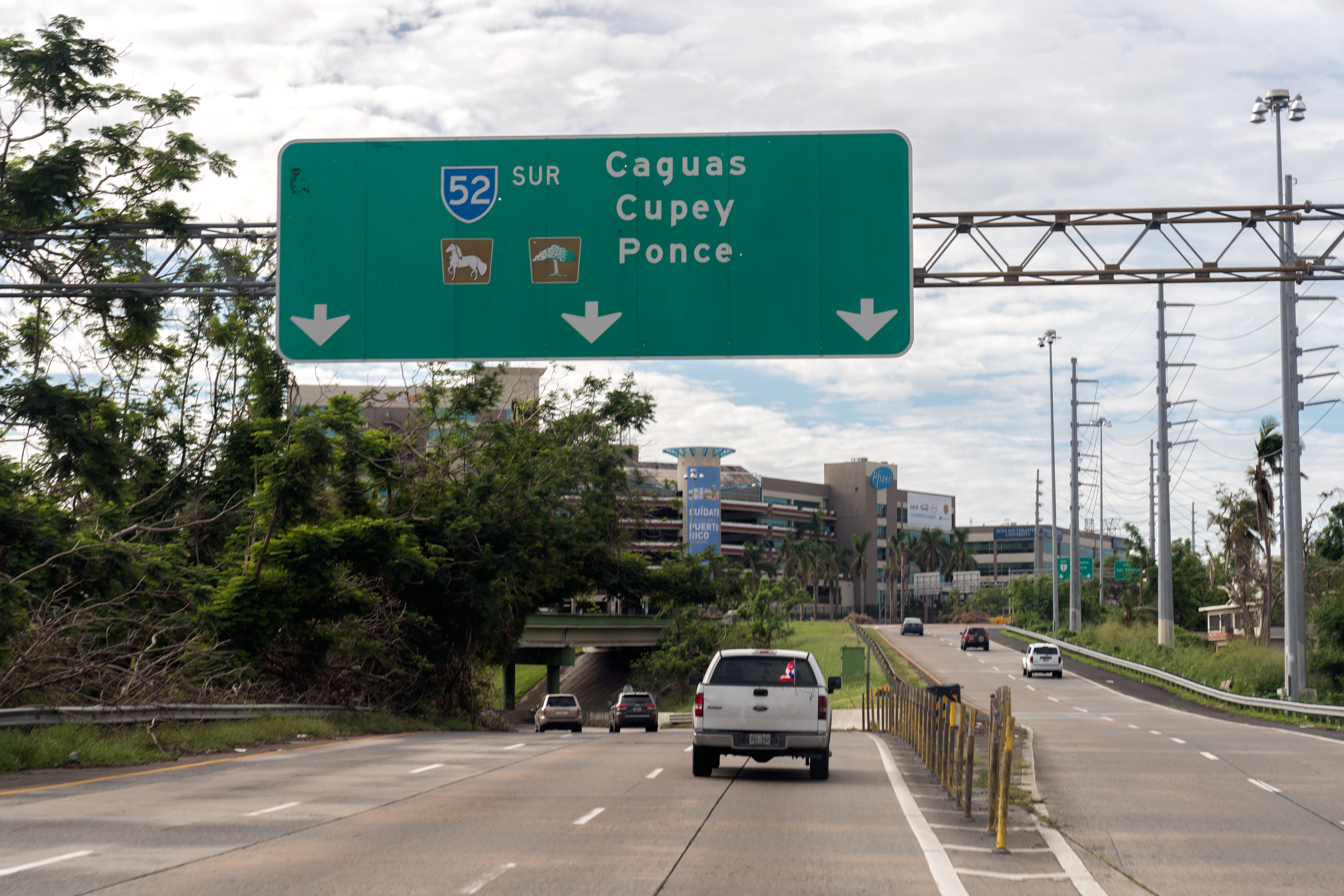
PR-52 south at its exit to PR-1 south in San Juan

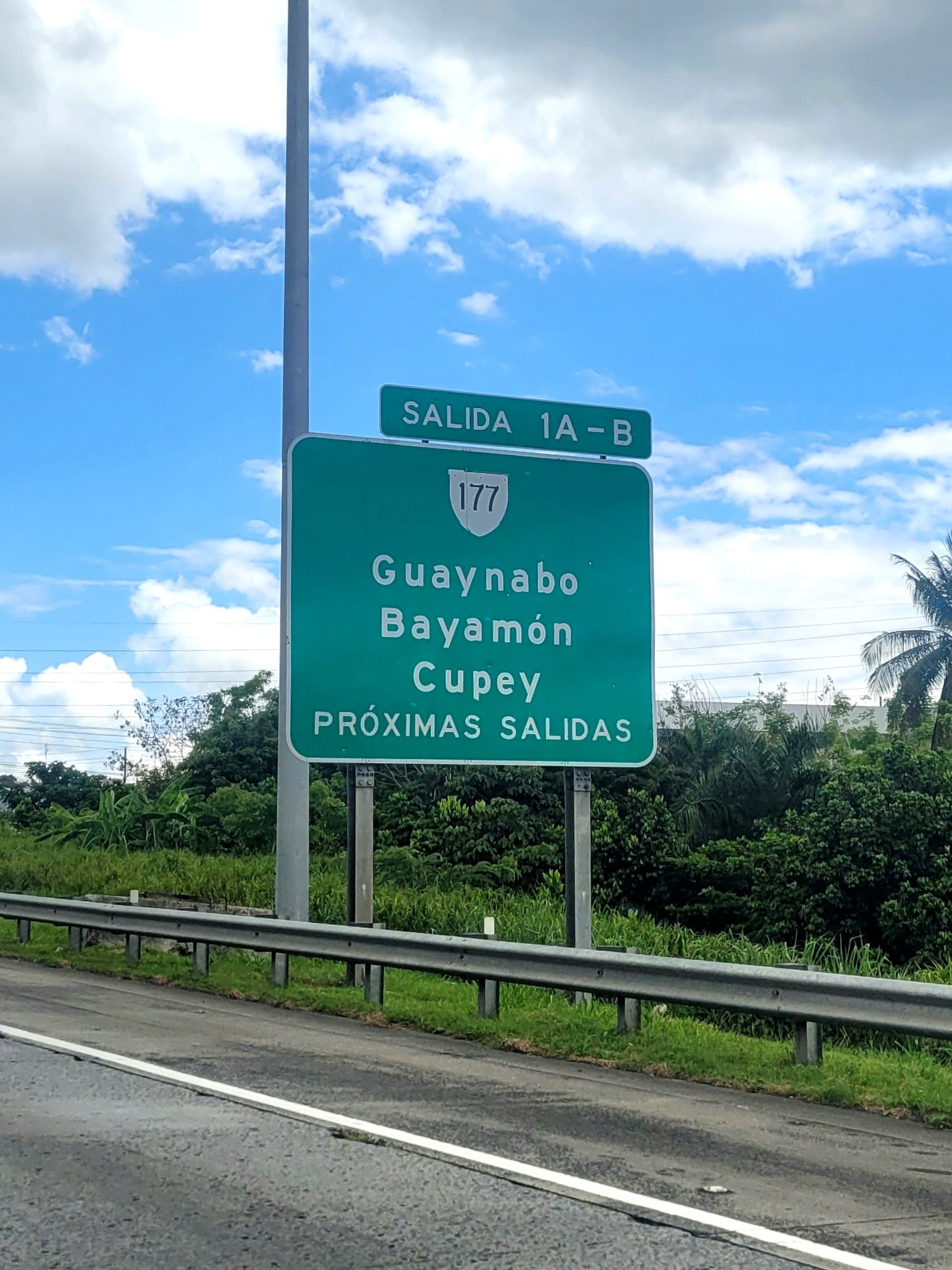
PR-52 south approaching exits 1A-B to PR-177 in San Juan

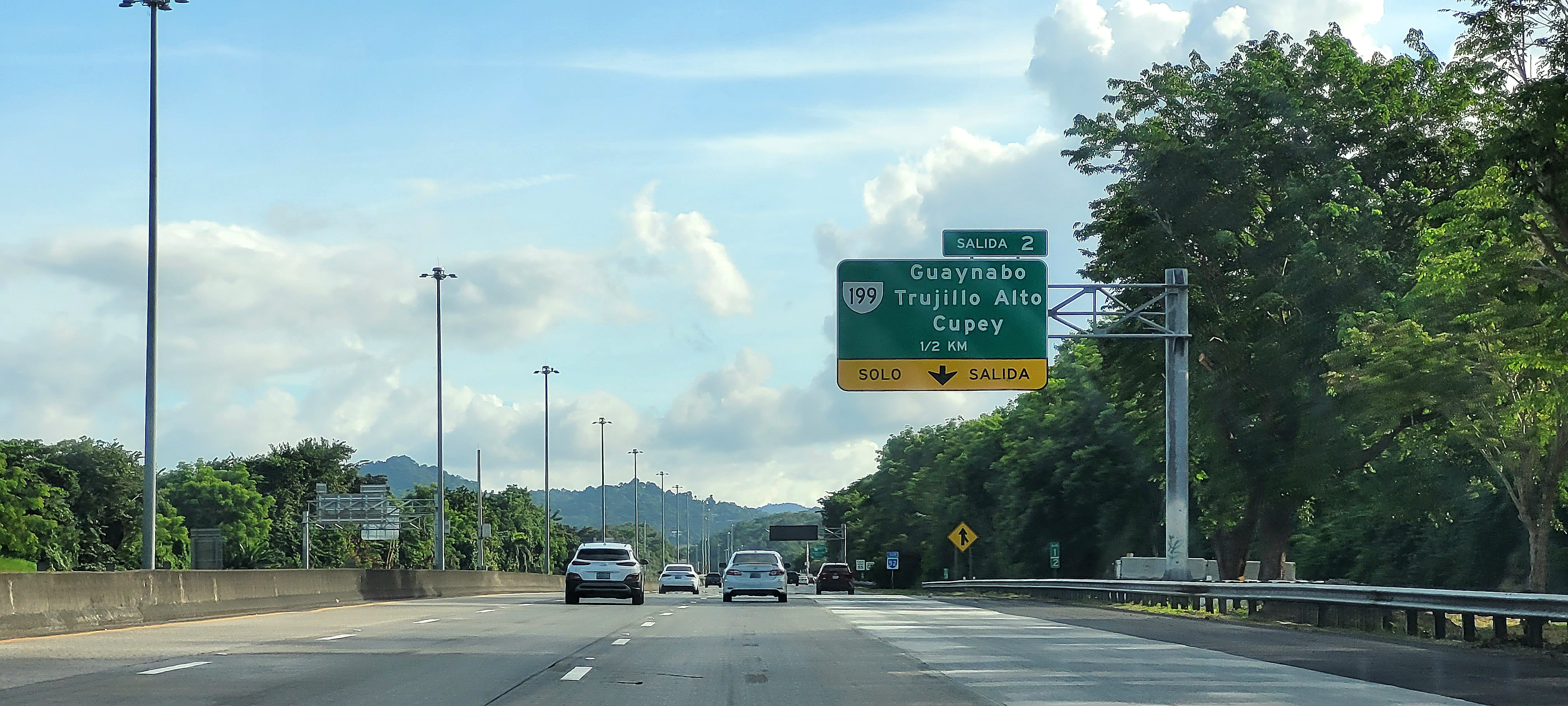
Heading south in San Juan

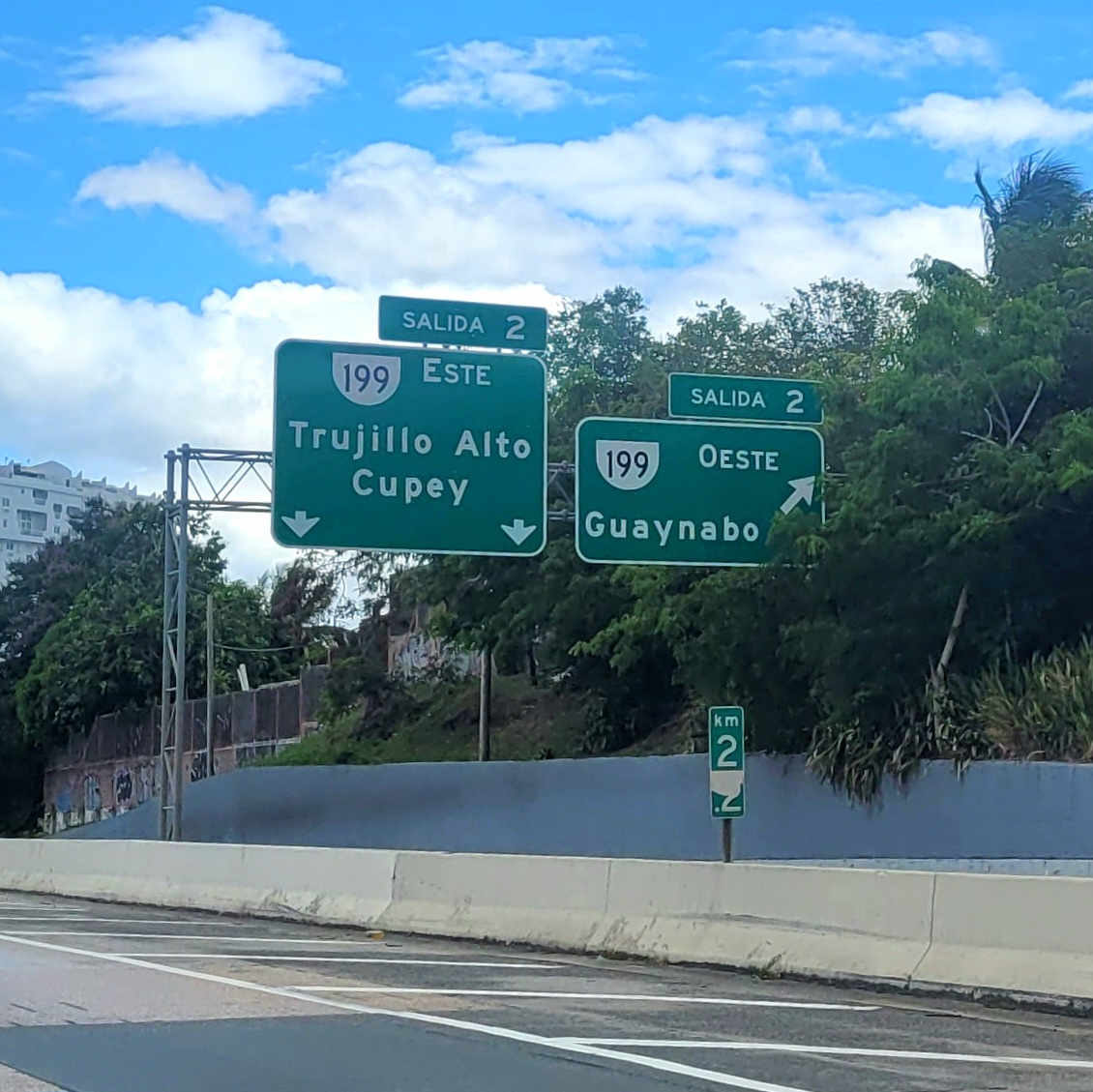
PR-52 south at exit 2 to PR-199 in San Juan

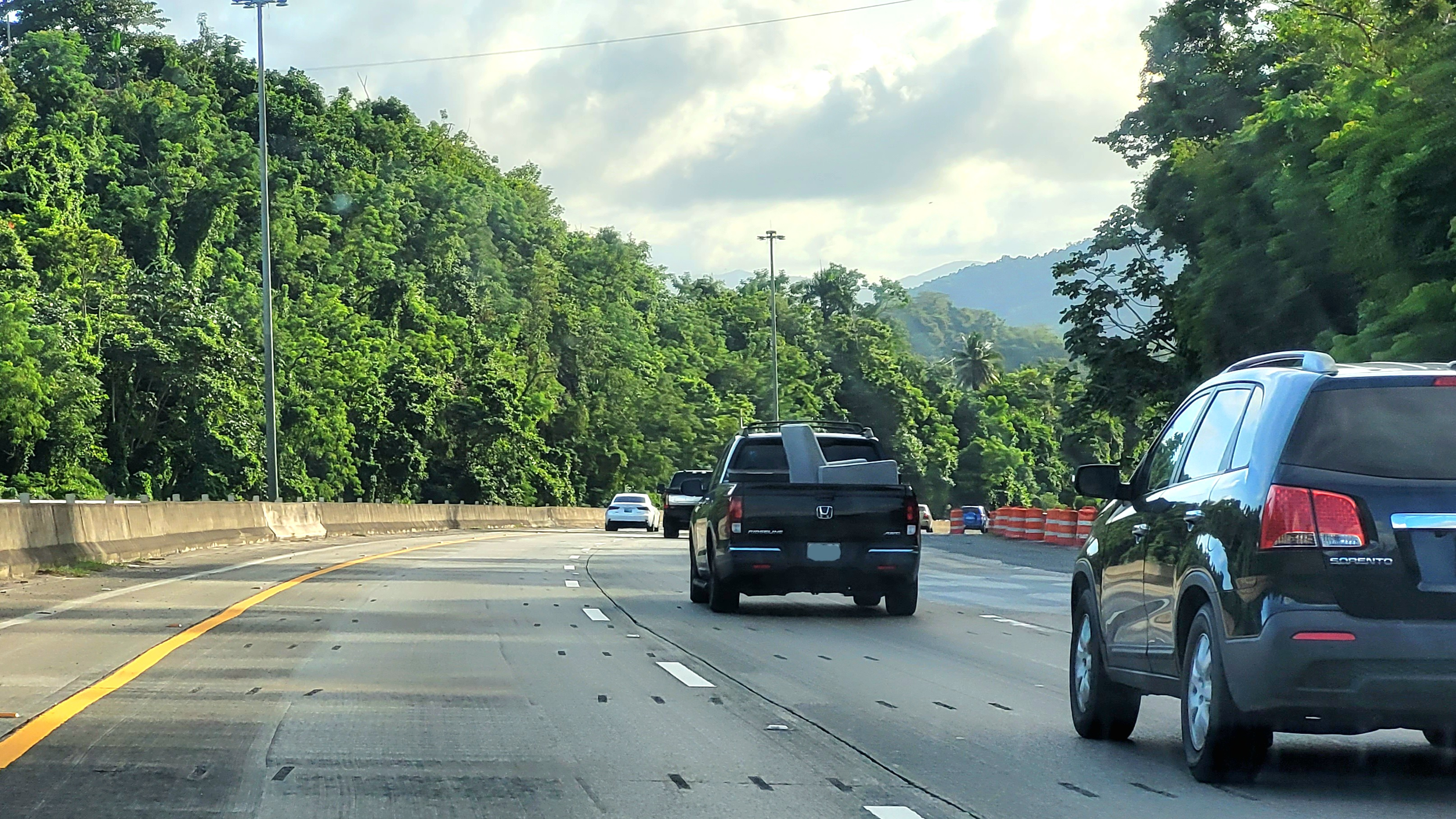
Heading south in Trujillo Alto

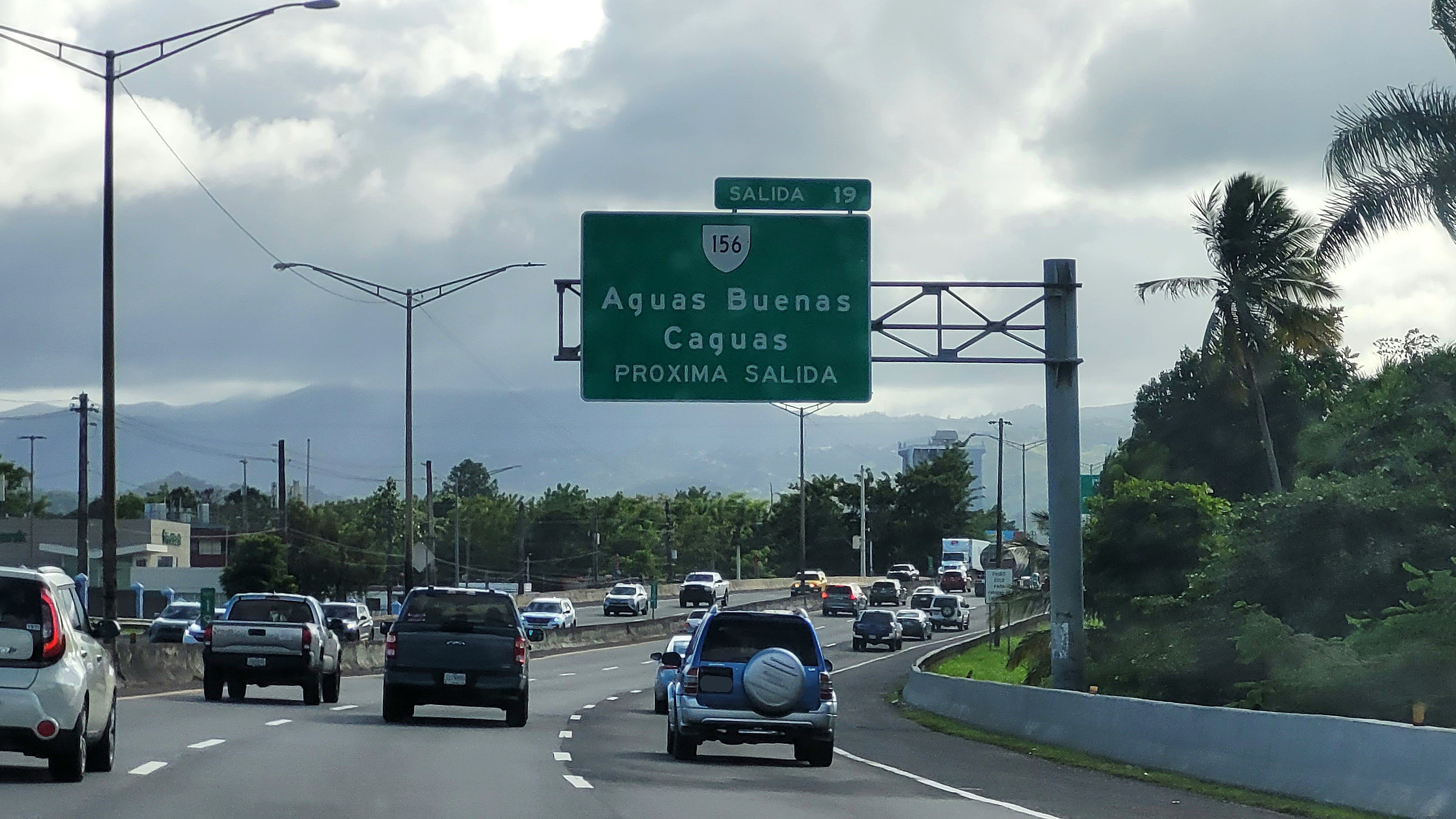
Heading south in Caguas

In Cayey, PR-52 passes extremely close to the municipality of Cidra between approximately kilometer markers 34 and 30. In fact, Exit 32 to Guavate is so close to the Cidra border that once the exit is taken and instead of going south to Guavate and Patillas through PR-184, going north it quickly ends at PR-1 and a welcome sign to Cidra is shown. The tollway itself never enters Cidra itself, but PR-1 (the parallel road from Ponce to San Juan) does.

The speed limit is reduced in the section between Cayey and Salinas crosses the Sierra de Cayey, resulting in a more curvy and hilly section than the other sections of the highway. Located at the orographic lift of the Cordillera Central, it also experiences more fog and lower visibility than the rest of the road due to the altitude. This is also the highest point of the route. One of Puerto Rico's only 2 rest areas is located on this section of the expressway in Salinas. (map) The other rest area is located on PR-53 (northbound only) near Humacao/Naguabo municipality border and, just like the rest area on PR-52, it has no operating facilities. (map) The rest area does provide view of a pair of important landmarks, the Monumento al Jíbaro Puertorriqueño and the famous Tetas de Cayey.

Beginning at the leeward side of Salinas, between here and Ponce, PR-52 crosses the southern coastal plain of Puerto Rico, crossing Santa Isabel and Juana Díaz. The route finally enters the urban area of Ponce at barrio Sabanetas, marked by the famous Letras de Ponce landmark.

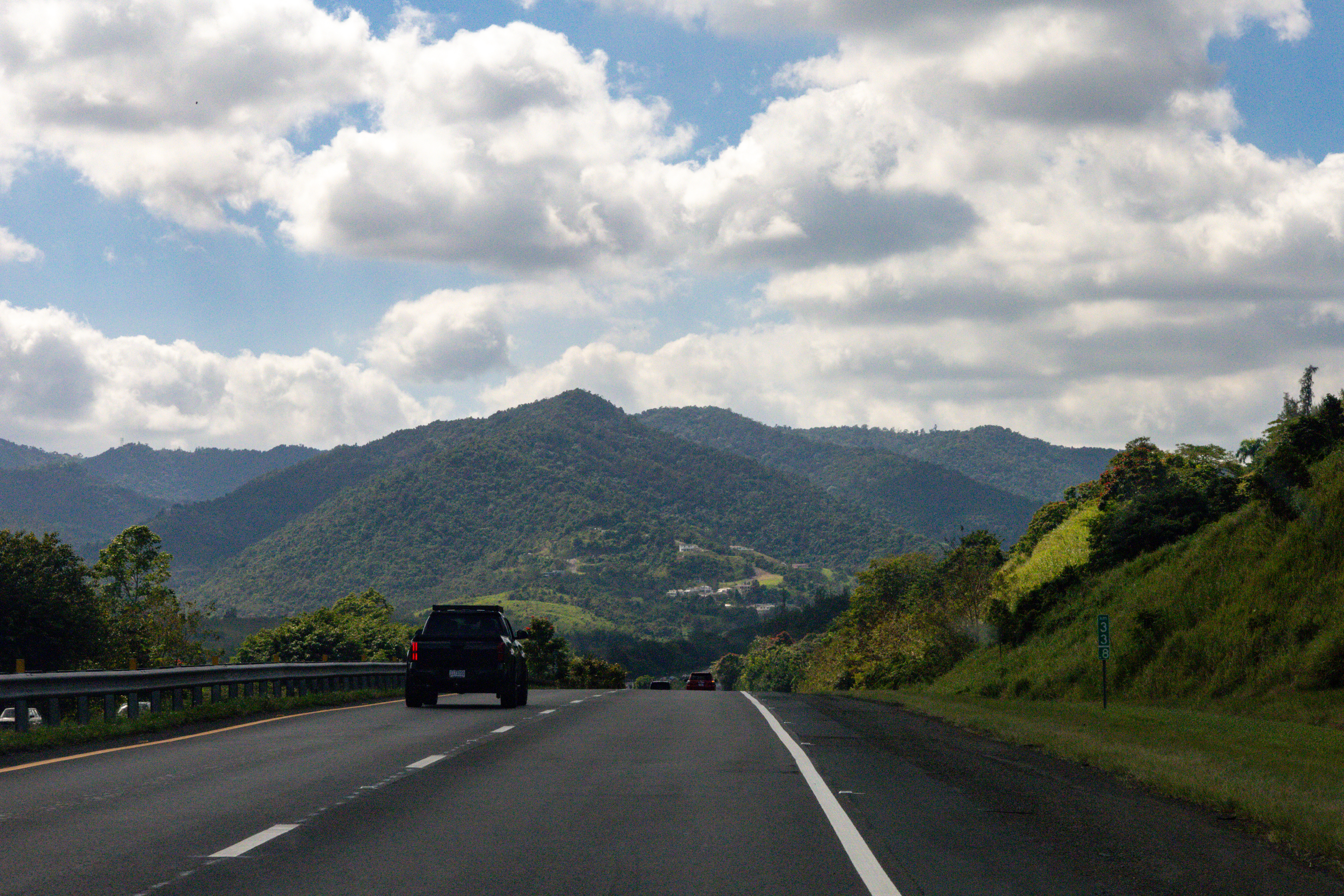
Heading southwest in Cayey

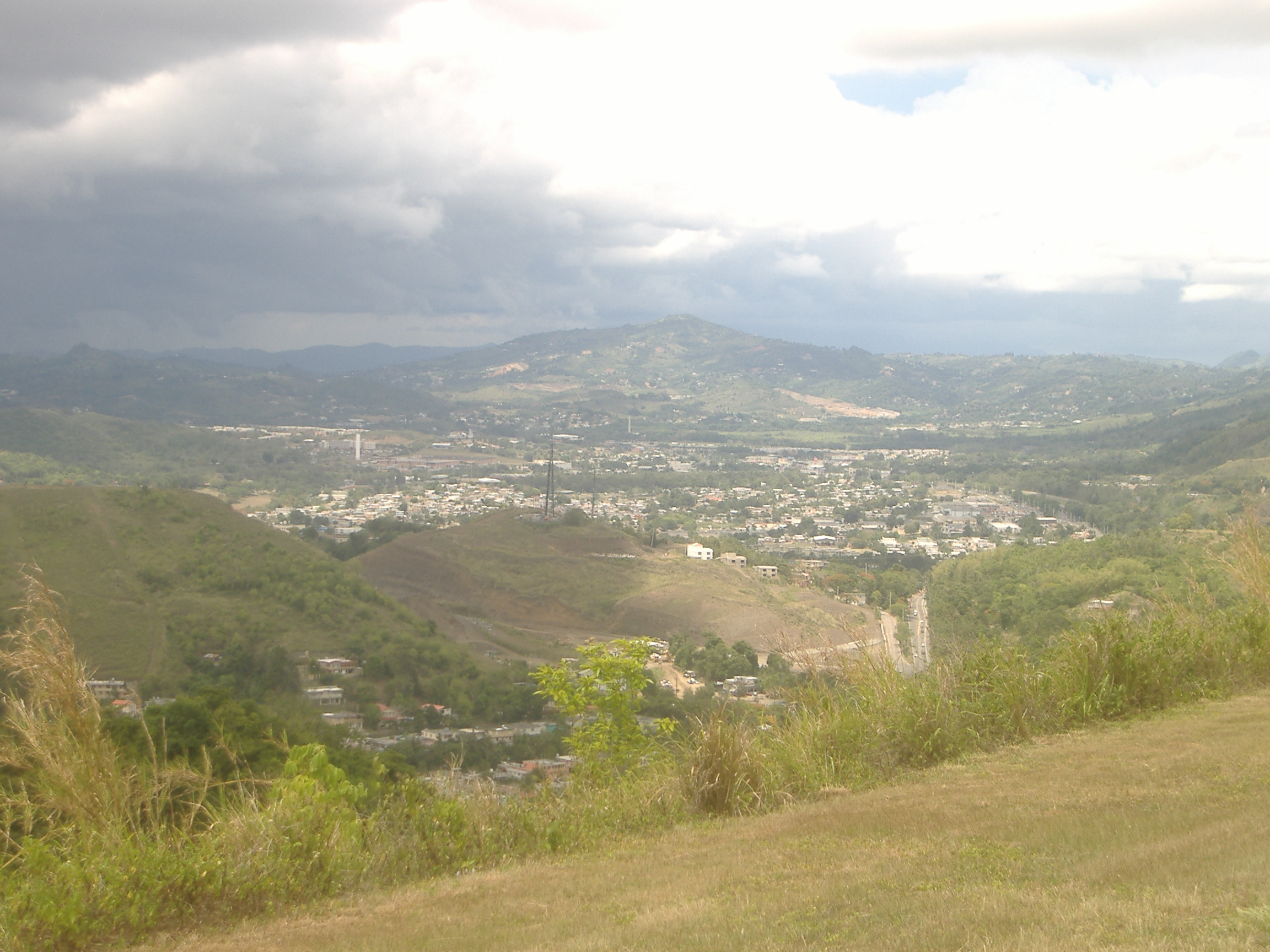
View from PR-52 in Cayey

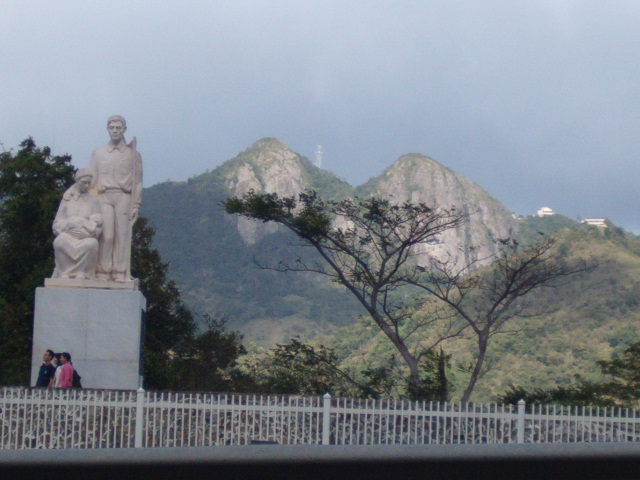
The Monumento al Jíbaro Puertorriqueño and Las Tetas de Cayey

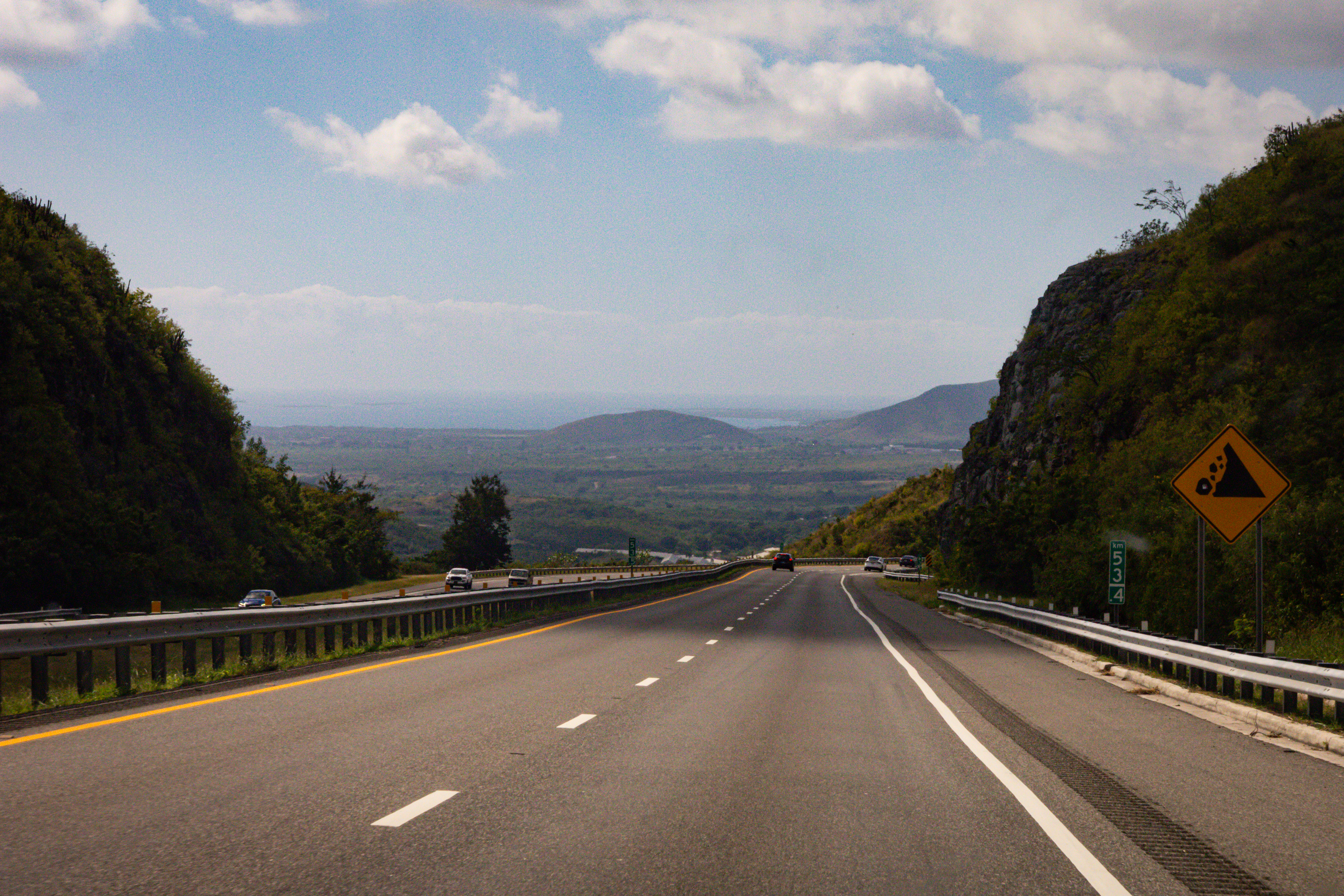
Heading southwest in Salinas

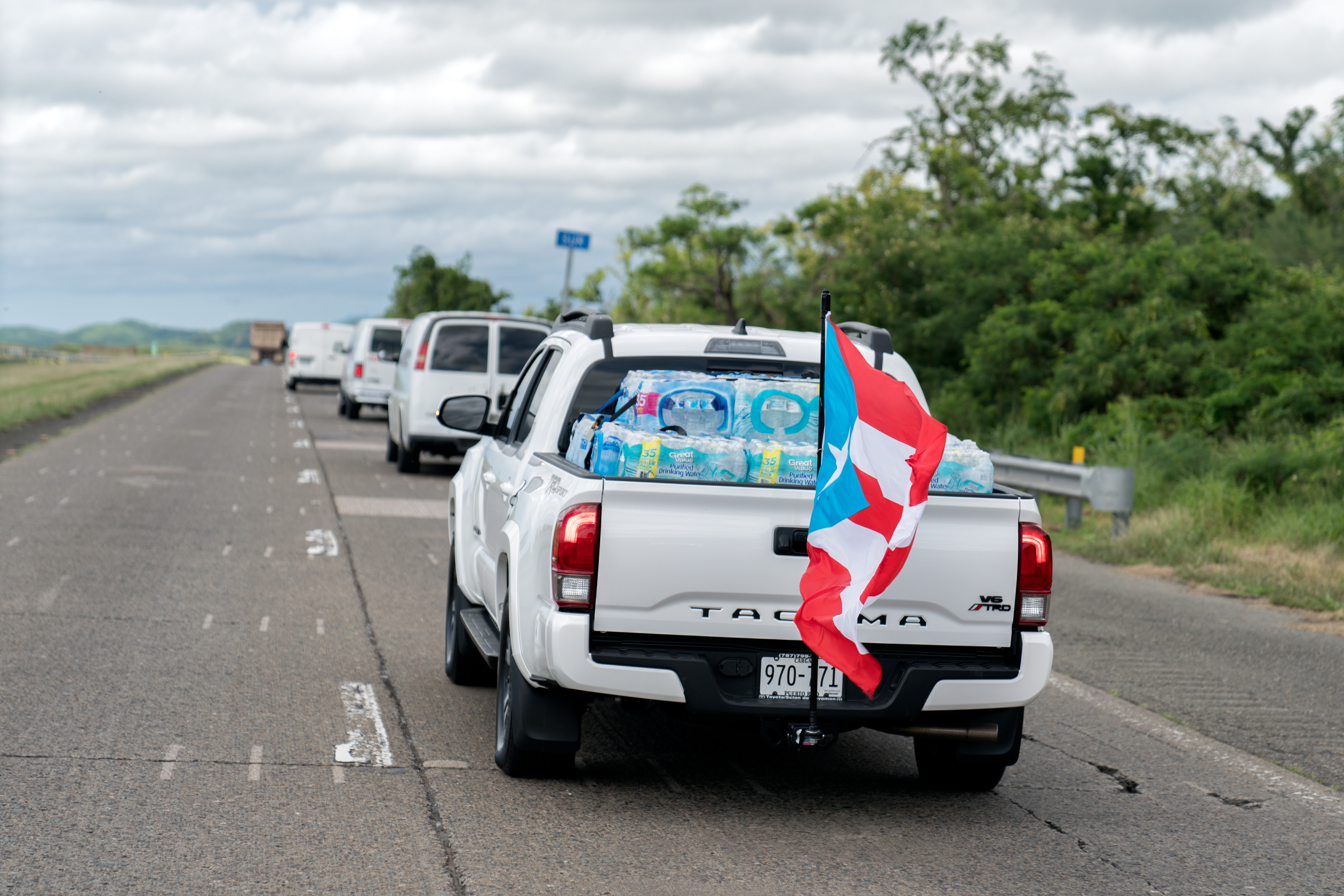
A Toyota Tacoma pick-up truck on PR-52 south, with water and flag, after Hurricane Maria (2017)

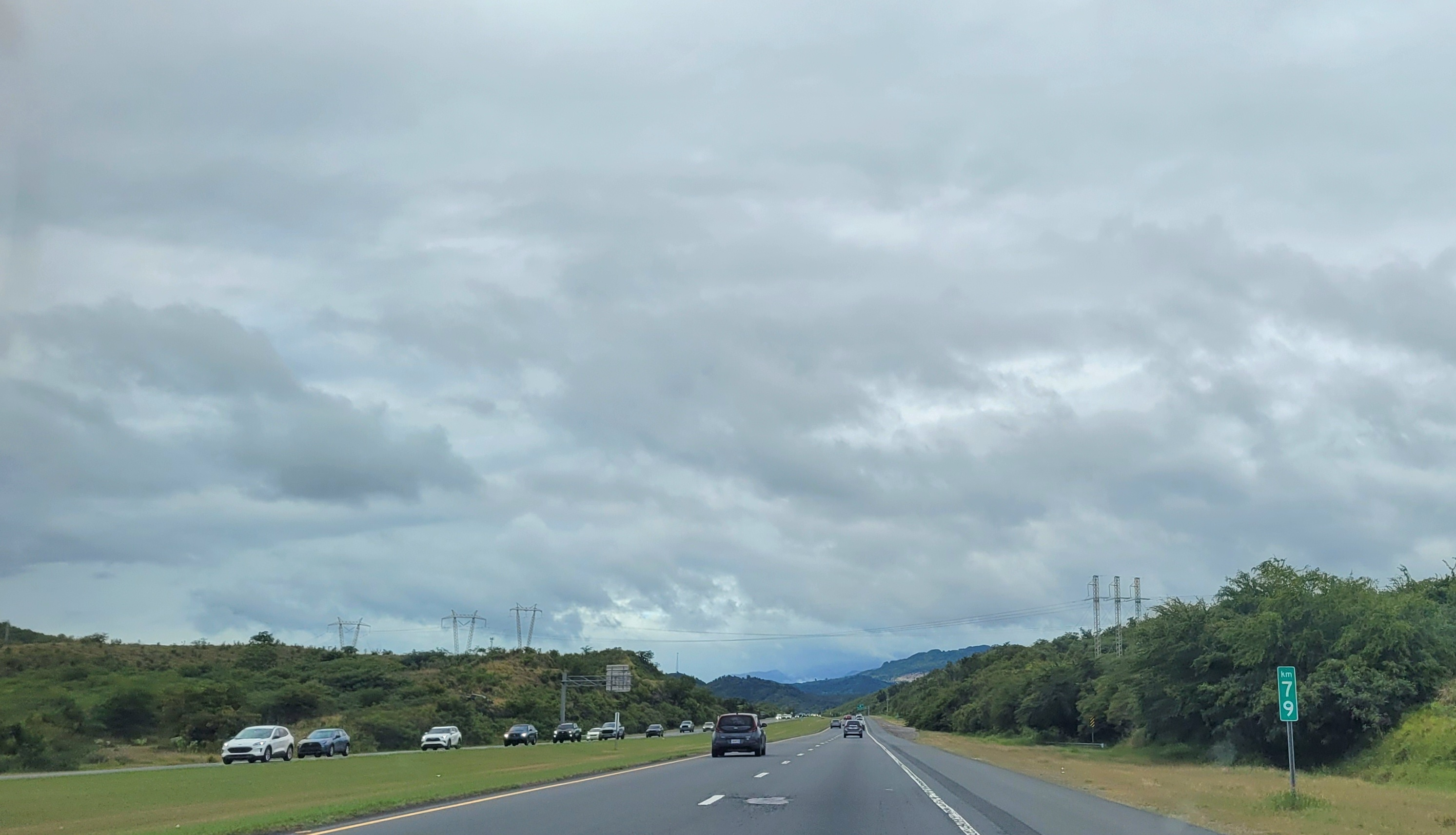
Heading northwest in Santa Isabel

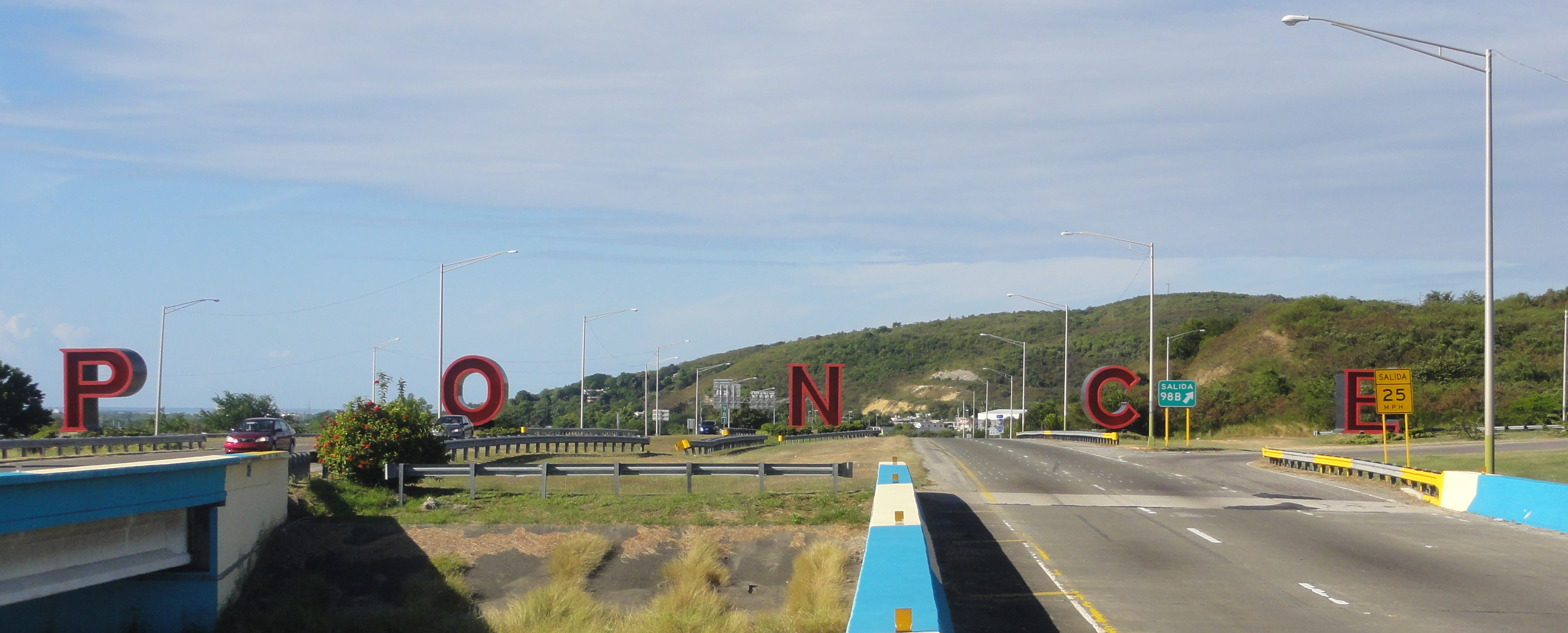
Heading west in Ponce

=== Express lanes ===
In 2021, the Puerto Rico Department of Transportation and Public Works and the Puerto Rico Highways and Transportation Authority inaugurated express lanes with dynamic tolling (DTL) between San Juan and Caguas to help alleviate traffic congestion during peak hours. These reversible lanes extends from PR-18, near Río Piedras Medical Center, to the Caguas Norte Toll Plaza with a variable rate between $0.50 and $6.00 per direction. The speed limit on the nearly 14-kilometer route ranges between 50 and 55 miles per hour (80–90 km/h). It is expected that in the long term the lanes will be extended to PR-30 heading to Gurabo.

== History ==
The building of this 108-kilometer (67 mi) expressway took place during the administration of governor Luis A. Ferré, who was trained as a civil engineer himself. It was built at a cost of $125 million. PR-52 was Puerto Rico's first toll road ever. Construction for this road started in October 1968 during the administration of governor Roberto Sánchez Vilella, also a trained engineer, and continued during Luis Ferre's tenure. It was then named Autopista Las Américas, and it was planned to run from San Juan to Ponce. The expressway is currently the longest in the island, but this will change when the 83-km-long PR-22 extends to Aguadilla. In March 1969 the roadway became a tolled expressway. The Puerto Rico Highway and Transportation Authority reports that tolls were added to the highway to speed up its construction. The road was completed in 1975 during the first administration of governor Rafael Hernández Colón. On 9 December 1993, Law 118 was enacted which renamed the roadway Autopista Luis A. Ferré. On 2007, construction of a suburban rail line connecting San Juan to Caguas to be built along PR-52 was announced by governor Aníbal Acevedo Vilá. After years of planning stagnation and the implementation of new AMA bus routes along reversible lanes, the project was cancelled in 2017 due to lack of funding.

The Las Américas section of PR-52/PR-18 along Hato Rey has been the setting of multiple mass protests in recent history. On February 21, 2000, more than 150,000 people participated in a mass protest against the United States Navy occupation of Vieques. On 22 July 2019, more than half a million protestors shut down this section demanding the resignation of the then governor, Ricardo Rosselló, following a leaked Telegram chat between the governor and several members of his cabinet.

== Tolls ==
Location	Toll	Direction	AutoExpreso acceptance	AutoExpreso replenishment (R) lane
Ponce	$1.00	Two-way		
Juana Díaz Oeste	$0.70	Northbound		
Juana Díaz Este	$0.70	Southbound		
Rampa Salinas	$0.50	Northbound exit and southbound entrance (ramp)		
Salinas	$1.15	Two-way		(northbound only)
Caguas Sur	$0.75	Two-way		(southbound only)
Caguas Norte	$1.05	Two-way		(northbound only)
Rampa Montehiedra	$0.50	Northbound entrance (ramp)		

== Exit list ==
Municipality	Location	km	mi	Exit	Destinations	Notes
Ponce	Canas	108.5	67.4	108	PR-2 west (PRI-2 / Expreso Roberto Sánchez Vilella) – Mayagüez, Guayanilla	Southern terminus of Interstate PR1 and PR-52. Splits into PR-2. PR-2 exit 224.
Ponce	Canas	108.0	67.1	108	PR-2 east (Ponce Bypass) / PR-9 north (Avenida Baramaya) – Ponce Oeste	Southern terminus of Interstate PR1 and PR-52. Splits into PR-2. PR-2 exit 224.
Ponce	Playa	105.5	65.6	Ponce Toll Plaza		
Ponce	Playa	104.9	65.2	104	PR-12 (Avenida Rafael Cordero Santiago) – Ponce Centro, Plaza del Caribe, Ponce Playa, Zona Portuaria	Signed as exits 104A (north) and 104B (south)
Ponce	Vayas	100.9– 100.8	62.7– 62.6	101	PR-1 – Ponce Centro, Mercedita	Signed as exits 101A (west) and 101B (east)
Ponce	Sabanetas	98.0	60.9	98	PR-10 – Ponce Norte, Adjuntas, Mercedita Airport	Signed as exits 98A (north) and 98B (south), access to San Lucas Hospital
Ponce	Coto Laurel	95.5	59.3	95	PR-506 – Coto Laurel	
Juana Díaz	Sabana Llana	93.8	58.3	Juana Díaz Oeste Toll Plaza (toll northbound only)		
Juana Díaz	Amuelas	91.2	56.7	91	PR-149 (Bulevar Carlos Bernier Rodríguez) – Juana Díaz, Villalba, Fort Allen	
Juana Díaz	Río Cañas Abajo	85.6	53.2	Juana Díaz Este Toll Plaza (toll southbound only)		
Santa Isabel	Descalabrado	81.4	50.6	80	PR-536 – Descalabrado, Los Llanos	Southbound exit and northbound entrance
Santa Isabel	Descalabrado–Felicia 2 line	77.7	48.3	77	PR-545 – Gabia	
Santa Isabel	Felicia 2	77.0– 76.9	47.8– 47.8	76	PR-153 – Santa Isabel, Coamo	
Salinas	Lapa	66.2	41.1	65	PR-1 – Salinas, Campamento Santiago	Toll on northbound off-ramp and southbound on-ramp
Salinas	Lapa	61.5	38.2	61	PR-53 east (Autopista José M. Dávila Monsanto) – Guayama	The northbound exit into the southwestern terminus of PR-53.
Salinas	Lapa	60.8	37.8	60	PR-53 east (Autopista José M. Dávila Monsanto) – Guayama	Directional T interchange; The left southbound exit into the southwestern terminus of PR-53
Salinas	Lapa	57.9	36.0	Salinas Toll Plaza		
Salinas	Lapa	57.6– 57.5	35.8– 35.7	58	PR-1 / PR-712 – Albergue Olímpico	Access via PR-1 / PR-712
Salinas	Palmas–Lapa line	49.2	30.6	—	Rest Area	Northbound exit has access to PR-714.
Cayey	Monte Llano	38.8	24.1	39	To PR-1 – Cayey, Aibonito, Cidra	Access to Centro Médico Menonita de Cayey
Cayey	Beatriz	32.2	20.0	32	PR-184 to PR-1 – Cidra, Guavate, Cayey Este	This exit is just a few feet away from the border of Cidra and Cayey
Caguas	Turabo	23.5	14.6	Caguas Sur Toll Plaza		
Caguas	Turabo	23.1	14.4	23	To PR-1 – Caguas Sur, Borinquen	
Caguas	Turabo–Cañaboncito line	21.4	13.3	21	PR-172 (Avenida Pino) – Caguas Sur, Cidra, Certenejas	The direct exit to Menonita Caguas Regional Hospital and Plaza del Carmen Mall
Caguas	Cañaboncito	20.5– 20.4	12.7– 12.7	20	Avenida Federico Degetau (PR-34)	Unsigned
Caguas	Caguas barrio-pueblo	19.3	12.0	19	PR-156 – Aguas Buenas, Caguas	
Caguas	Bairoa	18.4	11.4	18	PR-196 (Avenida José Garrido) – Bairoa, Valle Tolima	The direct exit to Las Catalinas Mall.
Caguas	Bairoa	16.1	10.0	15B	PR-1 south / PR-30 east (Expreso Cruz Ortiz Stella) – Caguas, Humacao, Gurabo	The exit from the southbound direction signed as Exit 14.
Caguas	Bairoa	15.8	9.8	15A	PR-1 north – San Juan, Guaynabo, Río Cañas	The exit from the southbound direction signed as Exit 15.
Caguas	Bairoa	15.5	9.6	15	PR-1 north – San Juan, Guaynabo, Río Cañas	The exits from the northbound direction signed as 15A (North) and 15B (South).
Caguas	Río Cañas	14.3– 14.2	8.9– 8.8	Caguas Norte Toll Plaza		
Caguas	Río Cañas	14.2	8.8	14	PR-1 south / PR-30 east (Expreso Cruz Ortiz Stella) – Caguas, Humacao	Southbound exit
Trujillo Alto	No major junctions					
San Juan	Caimito	4.1	2.5	4	PR-Avenida Montehiedra / PR-Camino Los Romero – Caimito	Toll on northbound on-ramp; signed as exits 4A and 4B southbound
San Juan	Monacillo	2.4	1.5	2	PR-199 (Avenida Doña Felisa Rincón de Gautier) – Guaynabo, Trujillo Alto, Cupey	
San Juan	Monacillo Urbano	0.9– 0.8	0.56– 0.50	1	PR-177 (Avenida Lomas Verdes) – Guaynabo, Bayamón, Cupey	Southbound exits signed as 1A (west) and 1B (east)
San Juan	Monacillo Urbano	0.3	0.19	0B	PR-1 north – Carolina, Río Piedras, Trujillo Alto	No northbound access to PR-1 south.
San Juan	Monacillo Urbano	0.0	0.0	0A	PR-18 north (PRI-1 / Expreso Las Américas) – San Juan, Bayamón, Hato Rey	Northern terminus of PR-52; PRI-1 continues northbound via PR-18. Access to Luis Muñoz Marín International Airport and hospitals.
1.000 mi = 1.609 km; 1.000 km = 0.621 mi: Incomplete access; Tolled; Route transition

== See also ==
- Interstate Highways in Puerto Rico
- List of highways in Ponce, Puerto Rico
