= Frailes, Guaynabo, Puerto Rico =

Barrio of Puerto Rico

Frailes
- Barrio
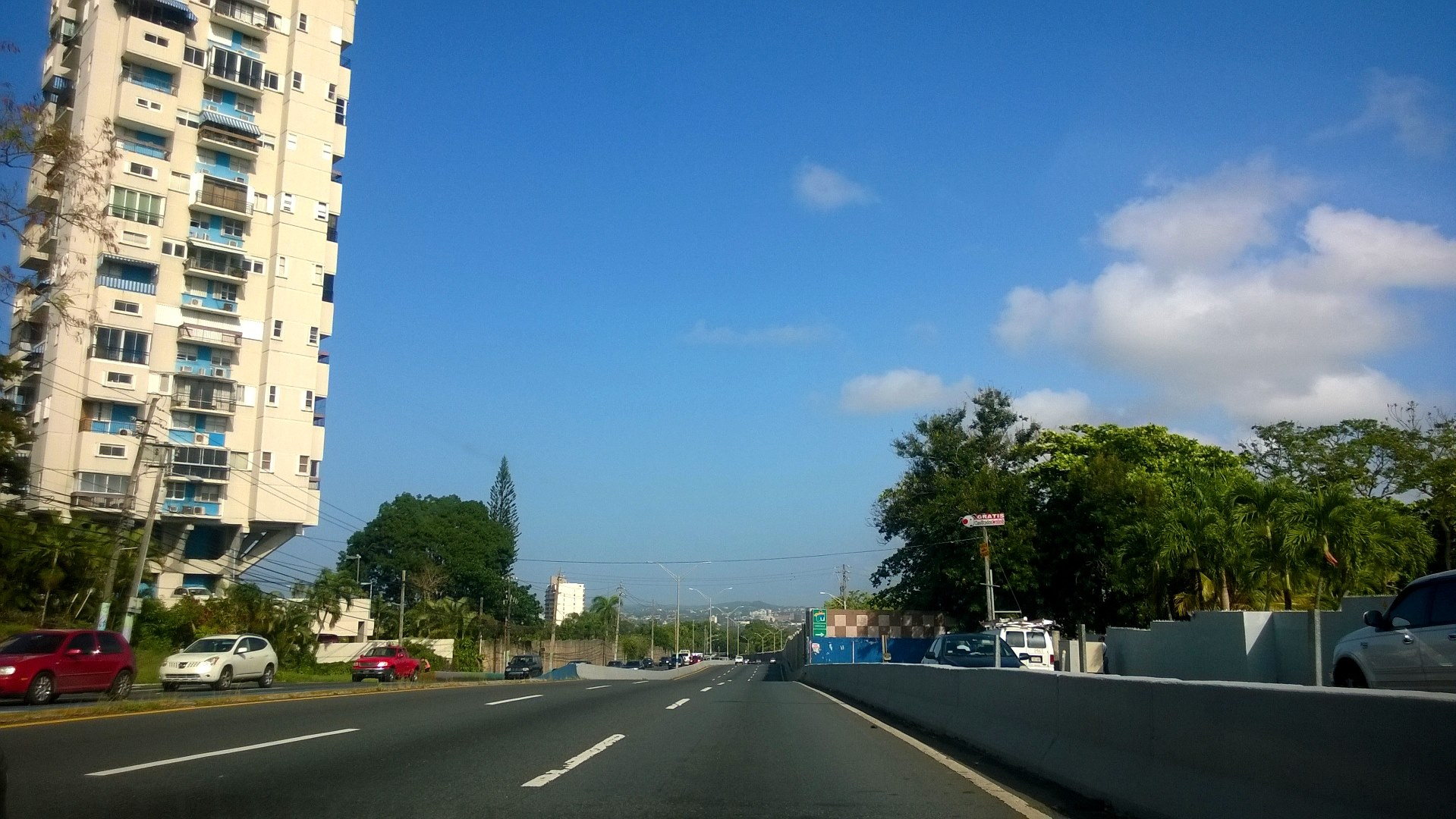
- Puerto Rico Highway 177 in Frailes

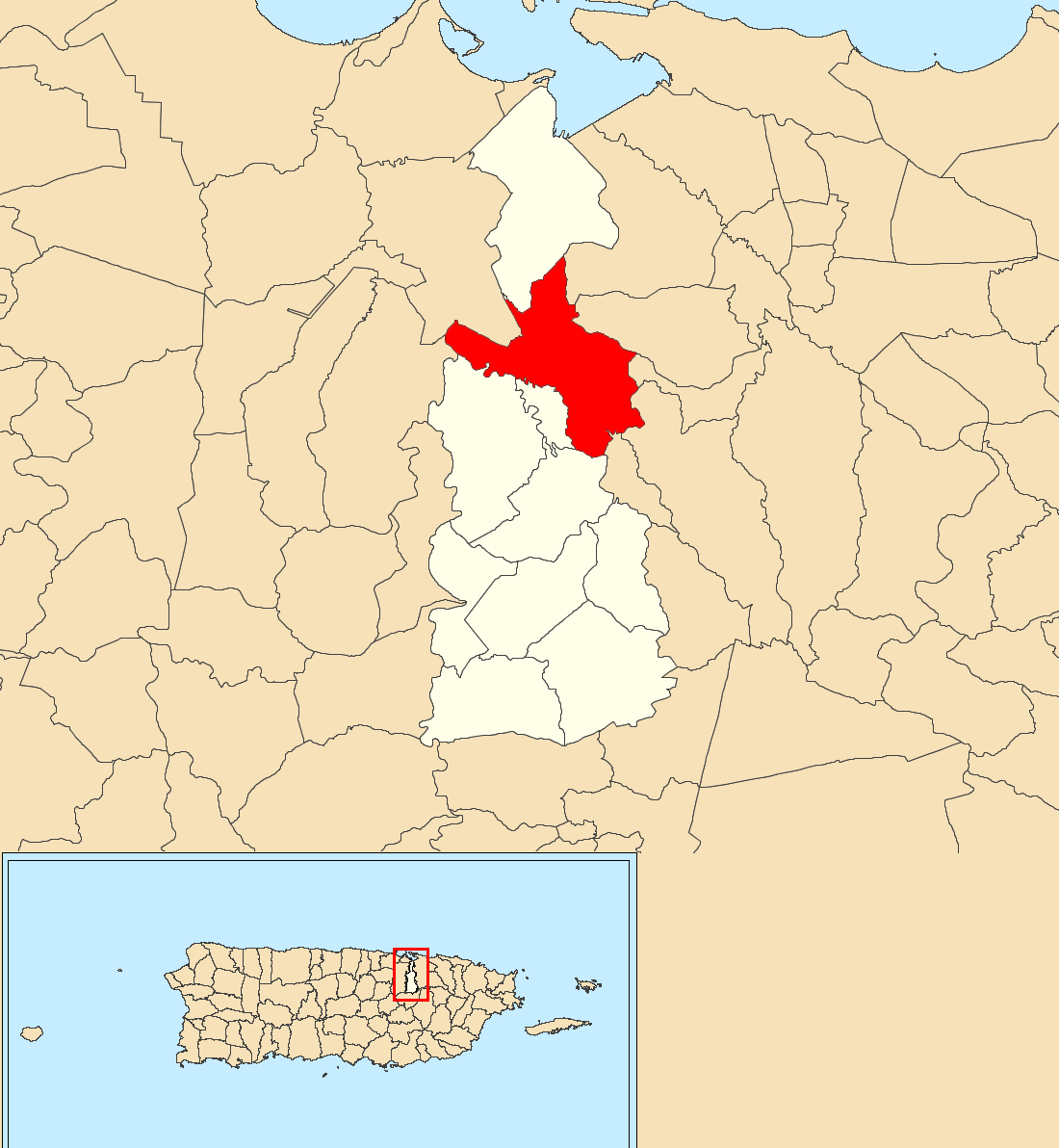
- Location of Frailes within the municipality of Guaynabo shown in red

- Location of Puerto Rico
- Coordinates: 18°22′16″N 66°06′32″W
- Municipality: Guaynabo

Area
  - Total: 4.10 sq mi (10.6 km^{2})
  - Land: 4.08 sq mi (10.6 km^{2})
  - Water: 0.02 sq mi (0.052 km^{2})
- Elevation: 112 ft (34 m)

Population (2010)
  - Total: 32,050
  - Density: 7,855.4/sq mi (3,033.0/km^{2})
- Source: 2010 Census
- Time zone: UTC−4 (AST)
- Website: US Census = Commonwealth

Frailes is a barrio in the municipality of Guaynabo, Puerto Rico. Its population in 2010 was 32,050.

== Geography ==
Frailes is located in central Guaynabo. According to the United States Census Bureau, the barrio has a total area of 4.1 square miles (10.6 km^{2}), of which 4.1 square miles (10.6 km^{2}) is land and 0.019 square miles (0.05 km^{2}) is water. It is situated 112 feet (34 m) above sea level.

== Demographics ==
Historical population
Census	Pop.	Note	%±
1910	537		—
1920	746		38.9%
1930	1,281		71.7%
1940	2,395		87.0%
1950	3,109		29.8%
1960	3,727		19.9%
1970	0		−100.0%
1980	15,631		—
1990	31,152		99.3%
2000	33,023		6.0%
2010	32,050		−2.9%
U.S. Decennial Census; 1899 (shown as 1900) 1910-1930; 1930-1950 1980-2000 2010

== Sectors ==
Barrios (which are, in contemporary times, roughly comparable to minor civil divisions) in turn are further subdivided into smaller local populated place areas/units called sectores (sectors in English). The types of sectores may vary, from normally sector to urbanización to reparto to barriada to residencial, among others.

The following sectors are in Frailes barrio:

Apartamentos Valles de Torrimar, Avenida Los Filtros, Barriada Cano, Barriada Cruz Meléndez, Barrio Frailes Llano, Barrio Piedras Blancas, Calle Casimiro Villegas, Calle Juan Martínez, Calle Ramón Murgas, Calle Vandal, Calle Villegas Valcarcel, Comunidad Los Frailes, Condominios Alta Vista, Condominios Altos de Torrimar I, II, III, IV, V, y VI, Condominios Alturas de Piedras Blancas, Condominios Arboleda, Condominios Athrium Park (Condominios Santa Paula), Condominios Baldwin Gate, Condominios Boulevard del Río I y II, Condominios Casa Maggiore, Condominios Chalets de Altavista, Condominios Égida CIA de P.R., Condominios El Bosque de La Villa de Torrimar, Condominios El Bosque, Condominios El Palmar de Torrimar, Condominios Emerald Court (Mansiones de Esmeralda), Condominios Feliciano, Condominios Four Winds, Condominios Frailes Norte, Condominios Gemini, Condominios Granada Park, Condominios Hannia María, Condominios Hills View Plaza, Condominios Jardines de Los Filtros, Condominios La Cima, Condominios La Ciudadela Nordeste, Condominios La Ciudadela, Condominios La Villa Gardens, Condominios Lincoln Park, Condominios Málaga Park, Condominios Monte de los Frailes, Condominios Monte Palacium, Condominios Monte Verde, Condominios Montesol, Condominios Parkville Plaza, Condominios Parque de Los Frailes Town Houses, Condominios Parque San Ramón, Condominios Plaza de Torrimar I y II, Condominios Plaza del Prado, Condominios Plaza Esmeralda, Condominios Portales de Alhelí, Condominios Prados del Monte, Condominios Quinta Valle I y II, Condominios Regency Park, Condominios Ridge Top, Condominios San Francisco Javier, Condominios San Martín Twin Tower, Condominios The Falls, Condominios Torre San Miguel, Condominios Torremolinos, Condominios Torres de los Frailes, Condominios Torrimar Plaza, Condominios Torrimar Town Park A y B, Condominios Villa Cerro Real, Condominios Villa de la Fuente, Condominios Villa Los Filtros, Condominios Villas de Parkville I y II, Condominios Vista de los Frailes, Condominios Vista La Colina, Extensión Muñoz Rivera, Hogar Parkville Home Elderly Care Center, Reparto Apolo, Residencial Rafael Martínez Nadal, Residencial Rosaleda, Sector Abril Llopiz, Sector Casimiro Villegas, Sector Cátala, Sector El Último Chance (Yambele), Sector La Lomita, Sector Las Bombas (Calle Picus), Sector Los Abreu, Sector Los Báez, Sector Los Burgos, Sector Los Caraballo, Sector Los Cosme, Sector Los Filtros, Sector Los García, Sector Los Romero, Sector Los Tacos, Sector Mariquita, Sector Meliá, Sector Ortiz, Sector Peñagarícano, Sector Pucho Huertas, Sector Valcárcel, Urbanización Alto Apolo Estates, Urbanización Alto Apolo, Urbanización Altos de Torrimar, Urbanización Alturas de Torrimar, Urbanización Apolo, Urbanización Artesia, Urbanización Baldwin Park, Urbanización Bellomonte, Urbanización Bosque de los Frailes, Urbanización Casa Linda Village (Casas A-10 a la A-52 y Bloque B), Urbanización Cerro Real, Urbanización Chalets de Santa Clara, Urbanización Colinas de Parkville, Urbanización El Álamo, Urbanización El Jardín, Urbanización Estancias de Guaynabo, Urbanización Estancias de Torrimar, Urbanización Estancias del Parque (Villas del Parque), Urbanización Frailes Lomas, Urbanización Frailes Norte, Urbanización Highland Gardens, Urbanización La Lomita, Urbanización La Villa de Torrimar (excepto Calle Reina Isabel: casas 1, 2, 9, 10, 168, 169, 170A, Calle Reina Victoria: casas 8, 187 y 188) Urbanización Las Villas Town Houses, Urbanización Las Villas, Urbanización Lomas Chalets (Toño Fuentes), Urbanización Los Frailes Sur, Urbanización Los Frailes, Urbanización Mallorca, Urbanización Mansiones de Parkville, Urbanización Mansiones de Santa Paula, Urbanización Mansiones de Torrimar, Urbanización Martin Court, Urbanización Monte Alvernia, Urbanización Monte Apolo Estate, Urbanización Monte Olimpo, Urbanización Muñoz Rivera, Urbanización Oasis Gardens, Urbanización Parkville Court, Urbanización Parkville Terrace, Urbanización Parkville y Extensión Parkville Town House, Urbanización Parque de Torremolinos, Urbanización Parque Mediterráneo, Urbanización Ponce de León, Urbanización Prado Alto, Urbanización Quintas de los Frailes, Urbanización Quintas de Parkville, Urbanización San Francisco Javier, Urbanización Santa Clara, Urbanización Santiago Iglesias, Urbanización Sevilla Biltmore, Urbanización Torremolinos Este, Urbanización Torremolinos, Urbanización Torrimar, Urbanización Villa Ávila, Urbanización Villa Clementina, Urbanización Villa Lissette, Urbanización Villa Rita, Urbanización Villas de Tívoli, Urbanización y Extensión Las Colinas, and Urbanización y Extensión Santa Paula.

== Notable residents ==
- Carlos Dávila Dávila

== Gallery ==
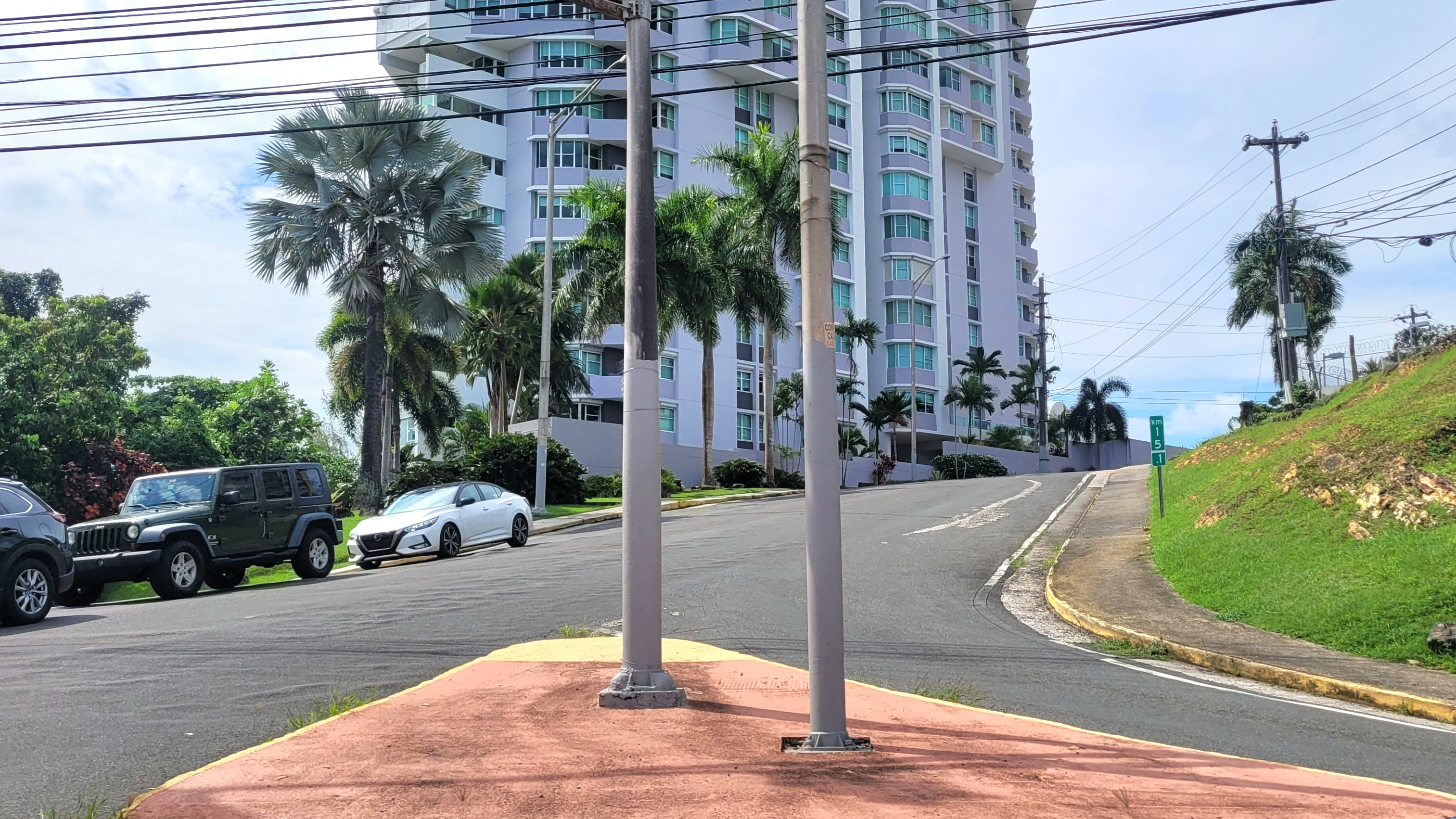
Puerto Rico Highway 833 in Frailes

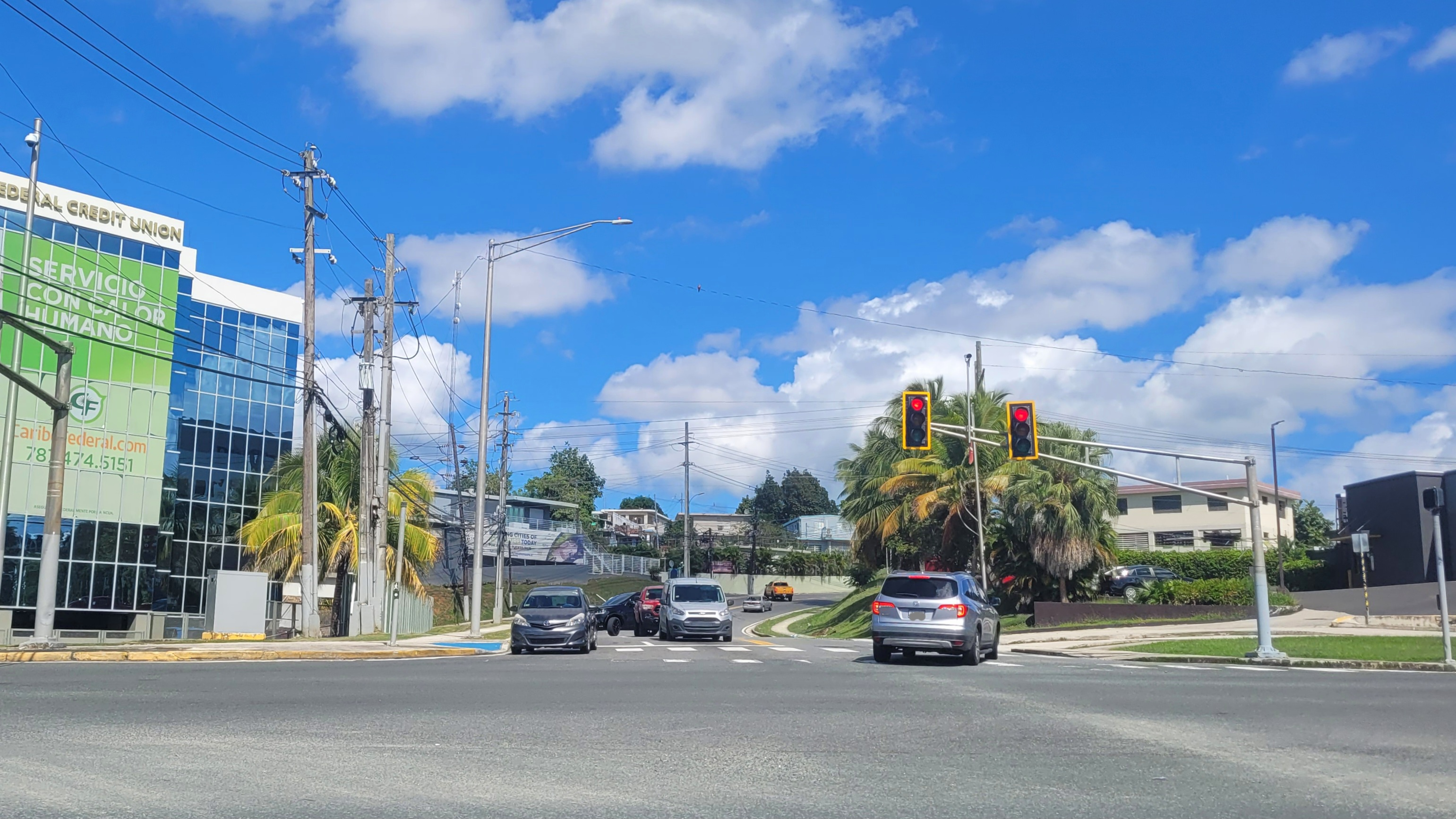
Puerto Rico Highway 838 in Frailes

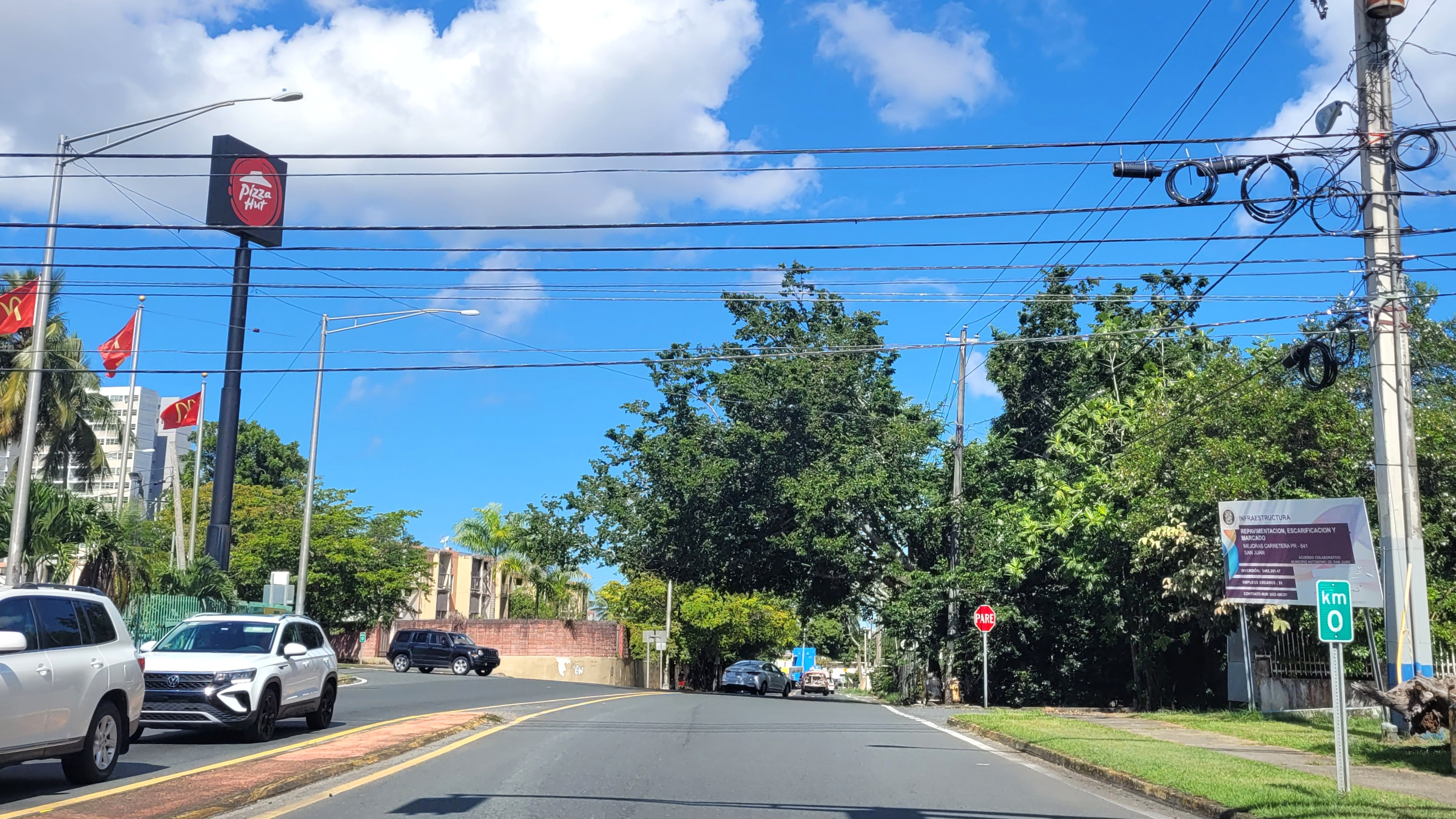
Puerto Rico Highway 841 between Frailes and Monacillo Urbano

== See also ==
- List of communities in Puerto Rico
- List of barrios and sectors of Guaynabo, Puerto Rico
