= San Juan-Caguas Rail =

Planned regional rail network in Puerto Rico

San Juan-Caguas Rail (Tren Interurbano) (proposed)

Overview
- Owner: Puerto Rico Department of Transportation (DTOP)
- Locale: San Juan; Caguas
- Transit type: Light regional railcar
- Number of lines: 1
- Number of stations: 5
- Daily ridership: 25,000 (Projected)

Operation
- Operator: Alternativa de Transporte Integrado (ATI)

Technical
- System length: 17 miles (27.4 km)
- Track gauge: 1,435 mm (4 ft 8 1/2 in) (standard gauge)
- Top speed: 85 mph (137 km/h)
System map

The San Juan-Caguas Rail project, named NOVOTRÉN, was a planned rail transit link between the Puerto Rican cities of San Juan and Caguas through a "regional rail network". The plan was announced by the Mayor of Caguas, William Miranda Marín, along with former governor Aníbal Acevedo Vilá on March 9, 2007. The agreement signed creates a public-private society between three parties: the central government, the city council and a regional partnership; it entails an investment of $200 million by the central government through the Government Bank of Development (Banco Gubernamental de Fomento in Spanish). The total cost of the project is estimated at between $375 million and $400 million.

The execution of the project would be managed by Mideast Technology Initiative "Tecnológica Centro Oriental" (INTECO), a non-profit organization that groups municipal governments, academic and industrial institutions of the region.

The new line would include two stops in Caguas that connect to the Tren Urbano (Urban Train in English) in San Juan. The mayor of Caguas projected that in first year ridership should be between 10,000 and 15,000 daily, and that it should climb to about 20,000 in a year and a half.

The Puerto Rico Highway & Transportation Authority (PRHTA) has chosen The Innovative Transportation Group (ITG) - formed by French rail and urban transport management and design consultancy Semaly and Ray and locals such as architect Raúl Gayá, a project group which carried out the study, the drafting of enterprise consultation file documents and assistance in the choice of the contract holders.

In March 2013, the name of the project was revealed and it is called the NOVOTREN.

The project was canceled in 2017 due to high cost.

== Overview ==
San Juan is the capital of Puerto Rico, and its metropolitan area has a population of approximately 2 million, almost one half of the main island's total. It is the economic and political center of Puerto Rico, and its main international entry point. Currently a 10.7-mile (17.2 km) automated metro system "Tren Urbano" is operating and underused.

Caguas, located about 20 miles (32 km) south of San Juan, is the fifth-largest city in terms of population with approximately 200,000. It is part of the agricultural, commercial and industrial core of the central region as well as part of the San Juan Metropolitan Area.

Currently, the main form of transportation between these two cities is by two highways, PR-52 and PR-1.

=== Features ===
To be competitive and attractive, the projected local and regional "rapid rail line" would run between San Juan and Caguas up to an ideally maximum 85 miles per hour (137 km/h), operating wholly on dedicated rights-of-way in the center of highway PR-52, covering the distance between the two cities in about 15 minutes (for comparison, an automobile takes about 20 minutes in non-rush hour time and may take up to 90 minutes in rush hour). Luggage racks and laptop computer sockets could be a possibility if projected future expansions are to be considered.

=== Schedule ===
As of August 2009, no work to date has begun and the project remains postponed, although one additional reversible (zipper-lane) express lane along PR-52 has since been added. Current traffic levels continue to remain heavily congested during rush hour periods.

The original schedule was set to begin with Tren Interurbano's technical proposals being revealed by the end of 2007 with several firms bidding for the construction contract shortly thereafter. Beginning stages of construction were originally scheduled for the first quarter of 2008, which was planned to finish around the end of 2009 or the first quarter of 2010, allowing for two years of construction time.

In March 2013, a new schedule was released on the local newspaper El Nuevo Dia. According to the published schedule, interested companies will be qualified into the project. Starting May 2013, proposals will be developed as well as negotiations with interested construction companies. During the months of September and October, proposals will be received and a company willing to build the rail will be chosen. Finally, during November or December, it is expected the construction will start.

In 2015, the Government of Puerto Rico projected that the train would be operating before elections on 2016.

=== Stations ===
The new train would link San Juan's Tren Urbano Cupey or Centro Médico stations with Las Catalinas Mall and Plaza Centro stations in Caguas. Several intermediate stops are proposed, one of these being Montehiedra, but according to the proposed route published in March 2013, Montehiedra would not be considered for a station.

=== Financing resources ===
Proposed financing would include a long-term concession model, similar to privately developed Teodoro Moscoso Bridge by SEOPAN under which private firms would finance, design, build and manage major portions of the system under long-term franchises. Federal Government funding is not being sought at this time.

== See also ==
- Rail transport in Puerto Rico
- Transportation in Puerto Rico
