= Monacillo, San Juan, Puerto Rico =

Barrio of San Juan, Puerto Rico

Monacillo
- Barrio
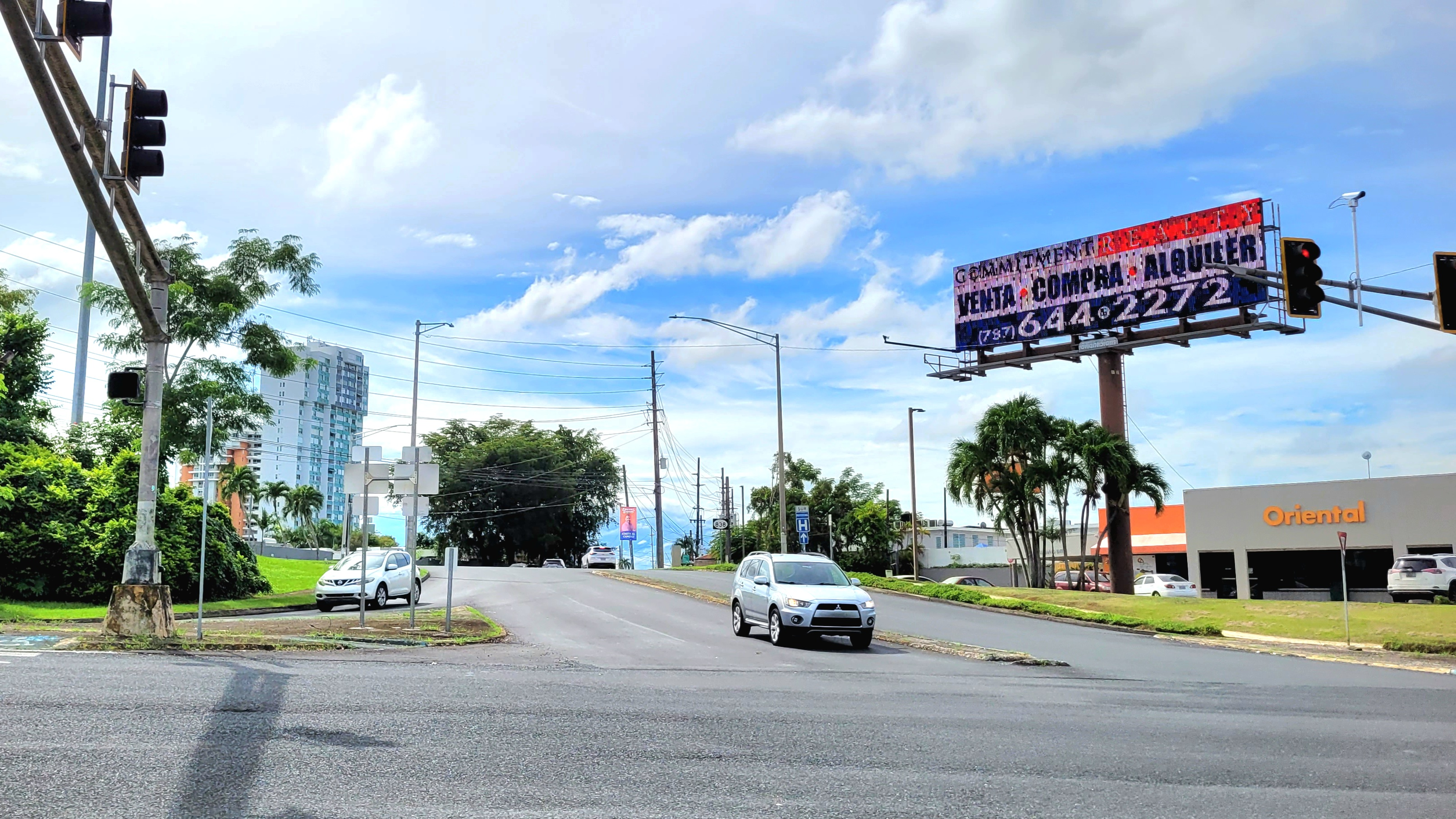
- Puerto Rico Highway 838 in Monacillo

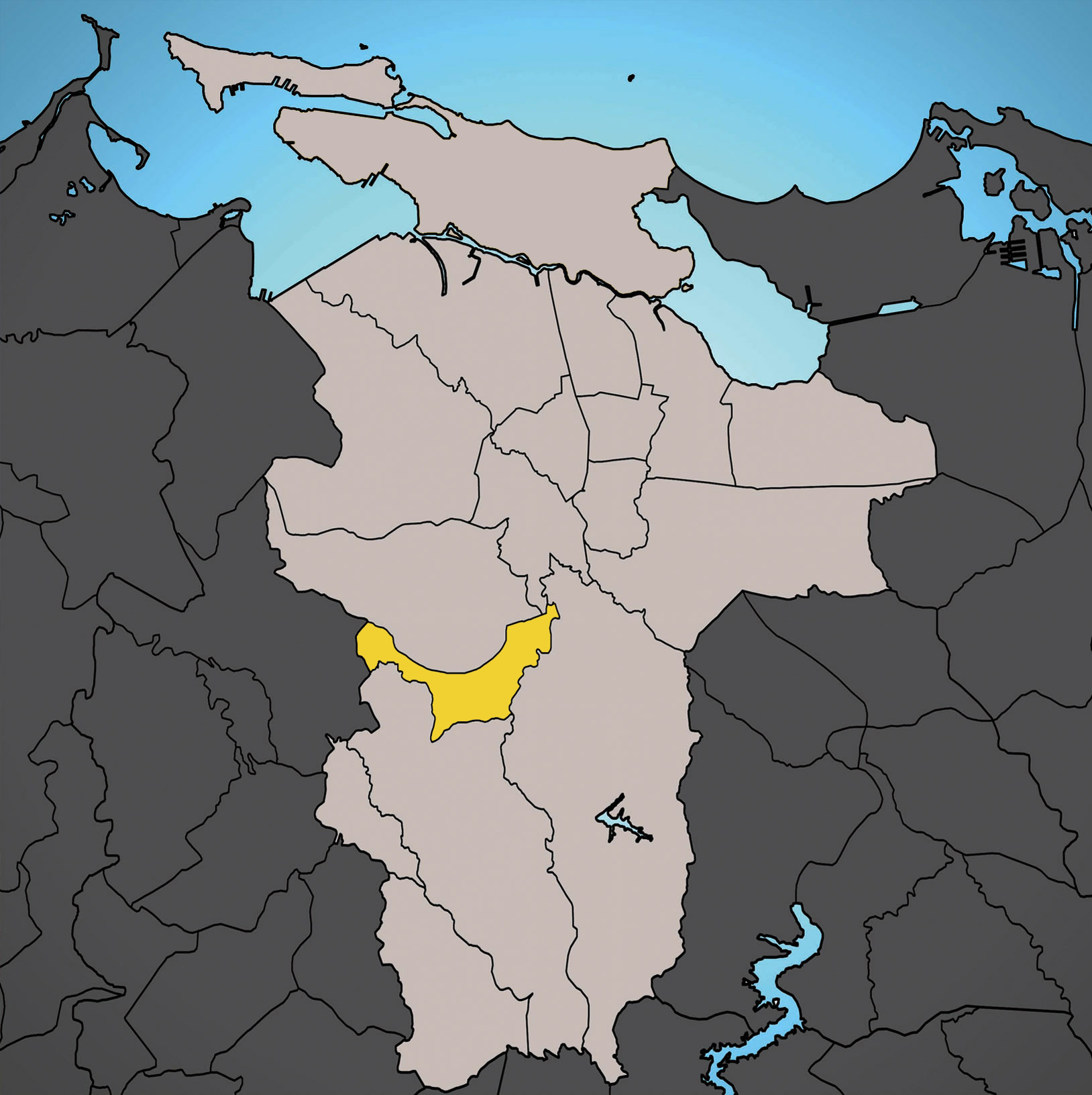
- Location of Monacillo shown in yellow
- Coordinates: 18°21′38″N 66°03′58″W
- Commonwealth: Puerto Rico
- Municipality: San Juan

Area
  - Total: 1.15 sq mi (3.0 km^{2})
  - Land: 1.15 sq mi (3.0 km^{2})
  - Water: 0 sq mi (0 km^{2})
- Elevation: 246 ft (75 m)

Population (2010)
  - Total: 11,442
  - Density: 9,949.6/sq mi (3,841.6/km^{2})
- 2010 census
- Time zone: UTC−4 (AST)

Monacillo is one of the 18 barrios in the municipality of San Juan, Puerto Rico. The barrio included the area that now forms Monacillo Urbano. In 2010, it had a population of 11,442 living in a land area of 1.15 square miles (2.98 km^{2}). Monacillo is surrounded by Monacillo Urbano barrio to the north, Cupey to the east, Caimito to the south, and the municipality of Guaynabo to the west.

== Demographics ==
Historical population
Census	Pop.	Note	%±
1950	413		—
1960	1,625		293.5%
1970	0		−100.0%
1980	13,772		—
1990	13,481		−2.1%
2000	12,425		−7.8%
2010	11,442		−7.9%
U.S. Decennial Census; 1900 (N/A) 1910-1930; 1930-1950 1980-2000 2010

== See also ==
- List of communities in Puerto Rico
