= Monacillo Urbano, San Juan, Puerto Rico =

Barrio of San Juan, Puerto Rico

Monacillo Urbano
- Barrio
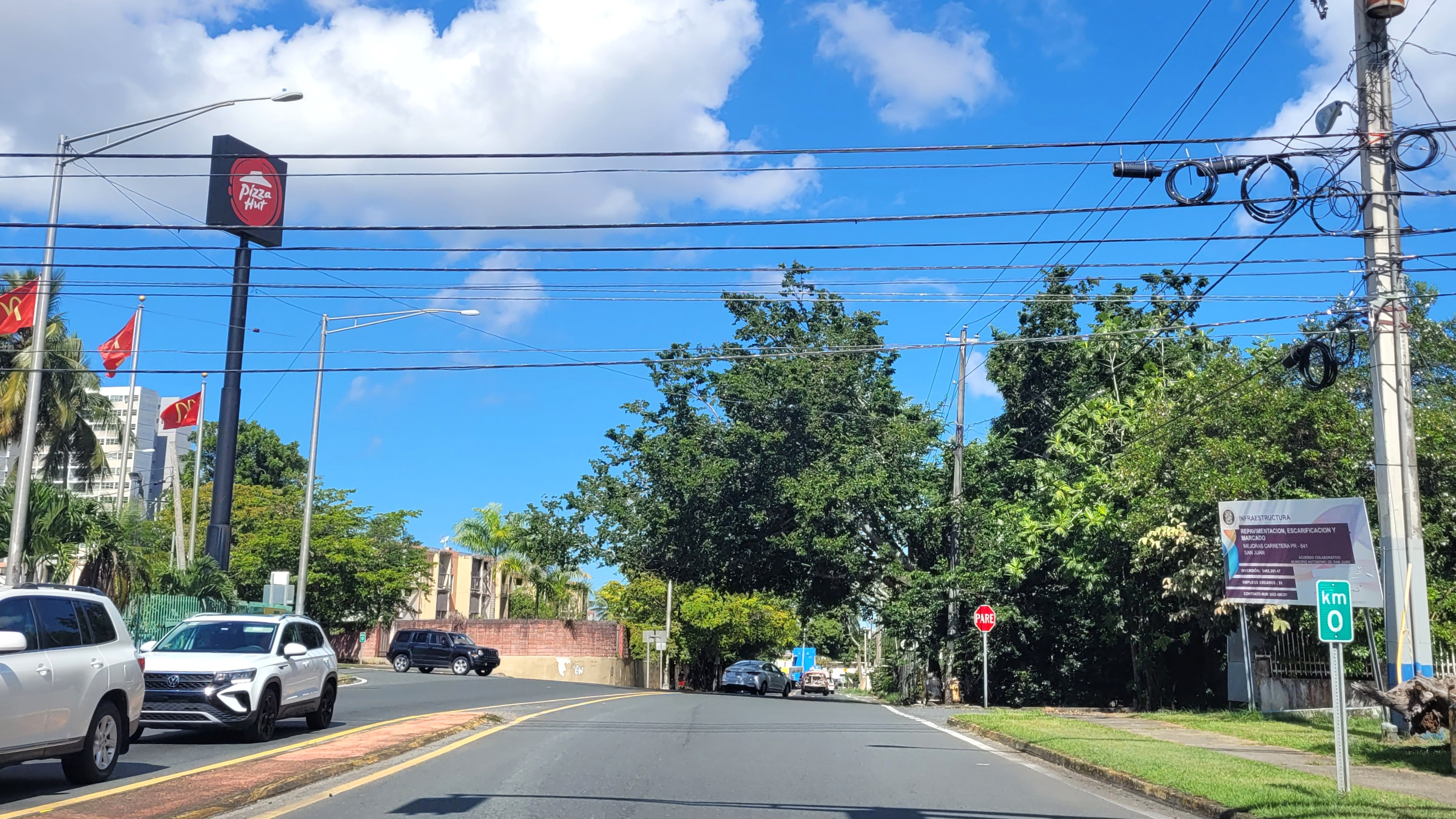
- Puerto Rico Highway 841 between Frailes and Monacillo Urbano

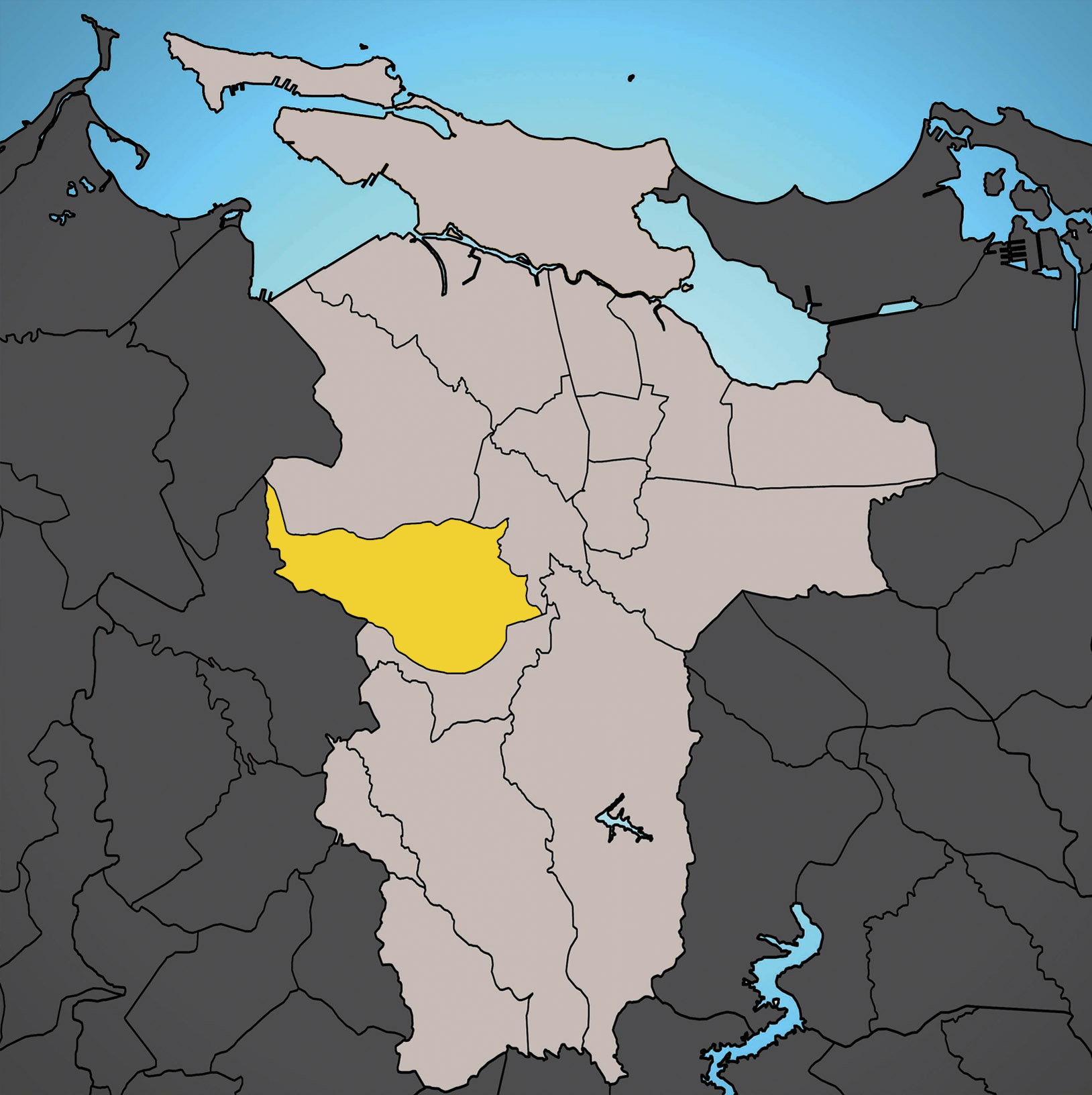
- Location of Monacillo Urbano shown in yellow.
- Coordinates: 18°22′48″N 66°04′52″W
- Commonwealth: Puerto Rico
- Municipality: San Juan

Area
  - Total: 3.23 sq mi (8.4 km^{2})
  - Land: 3.23 sq mi (8.4 km^{2})
  - Water: 0 sq mi (0 km^{2})
- Elevation: 141 ft (43 m)

Population (2010)
  - Total: 22,342
  - Density: 6,917/sq mi (2,671/km^{2})
- 2010 census
- Time zone: UTC−4 (AST)

Monacillo Urbano is one of 18 barrios in the municipality of San Juan, Puerto Rico. The barrio was originally part of Monacillo. In 2010, it had a population of 22,342 living in a land area of 3.23 square miles (8.68 km^{2}). Monacillo Urbano is surrounded by Gobernador Piñero barrio to the north, El Cinco barrio to the east, Monacillo barrio to the south, and the municipality of Guaynabo to the west.

== Demographics ==
Historical population
Census	Pop.	Note	%±
1950	7,210		—
1960	18,058		150.5%
1970	0		−100.0%
1980	28,417		—
1990	28,707		1.0%
2000	29,309		2.1%
2010	22,342		−23.8%
U.S. Decennial Census; 1900 (N/A) 1910-1930; 1930-1950 1980-2000 2010

== See also ==
- List of communities in Puerto Rico
