= Río Piedras, Puerto Rico =

District of San Juan, Puerto Rico

Río Piedras
- Subbarrio
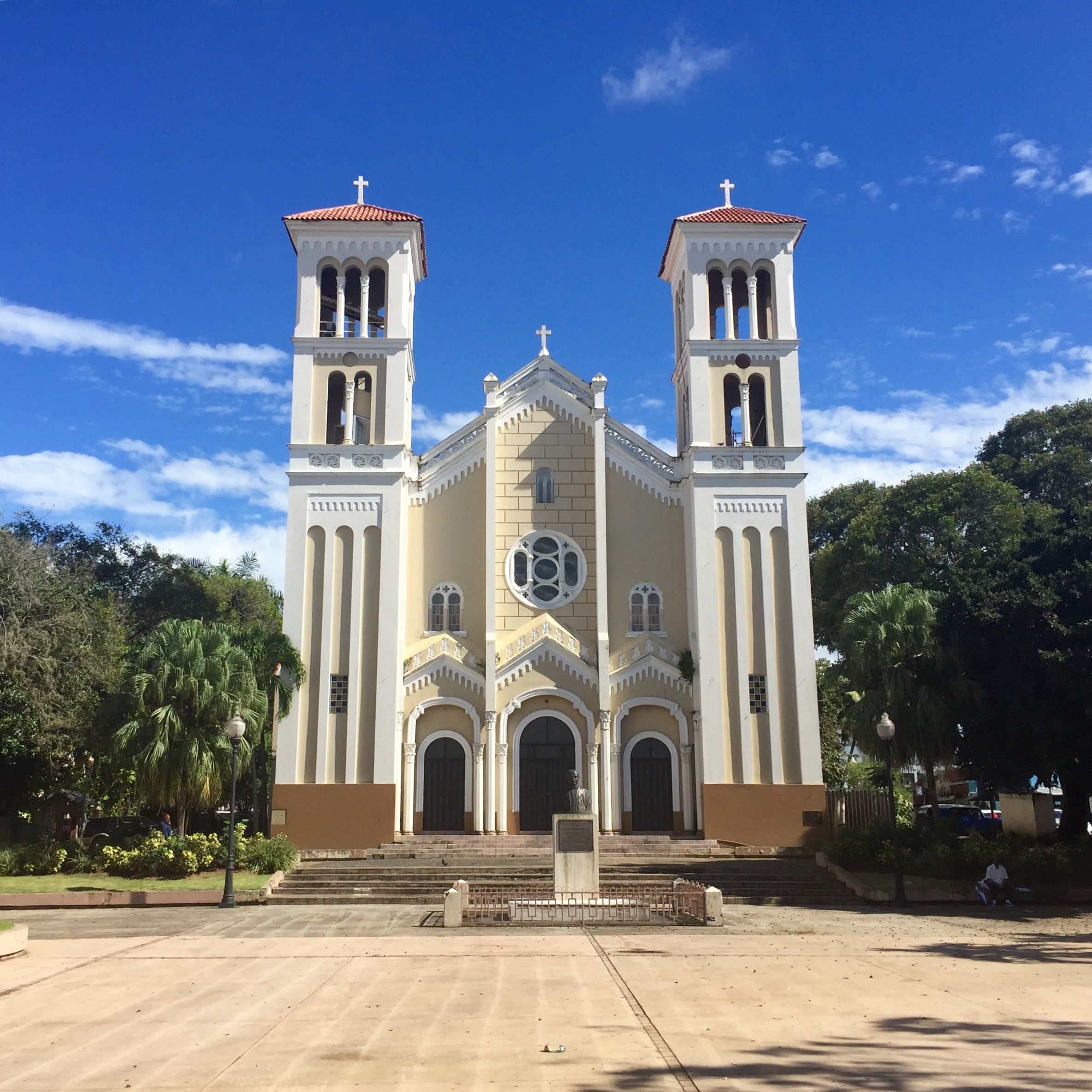
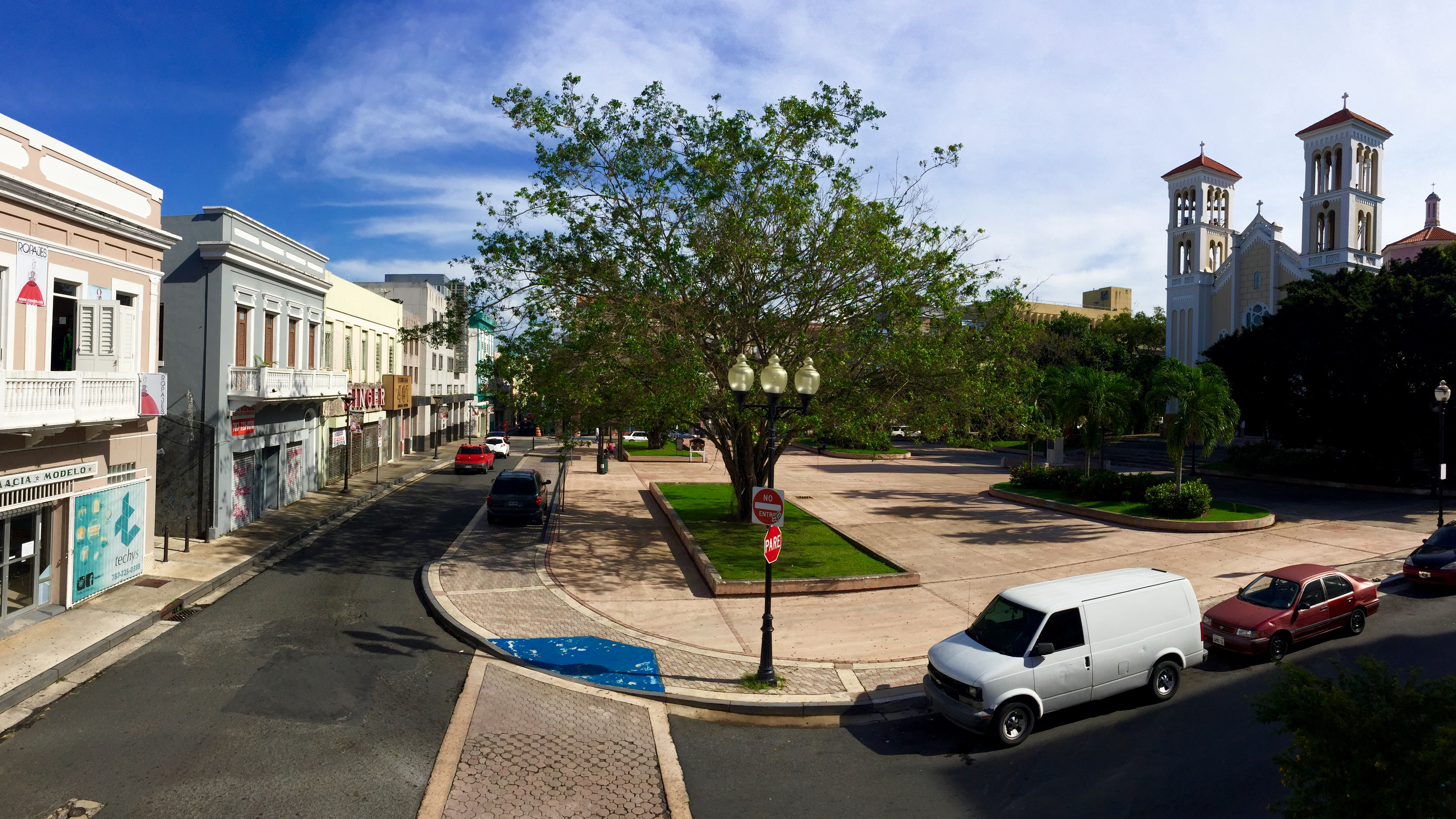
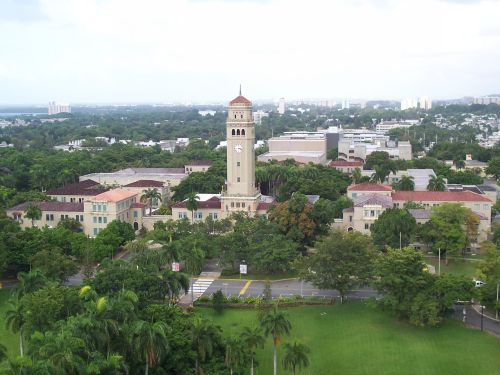
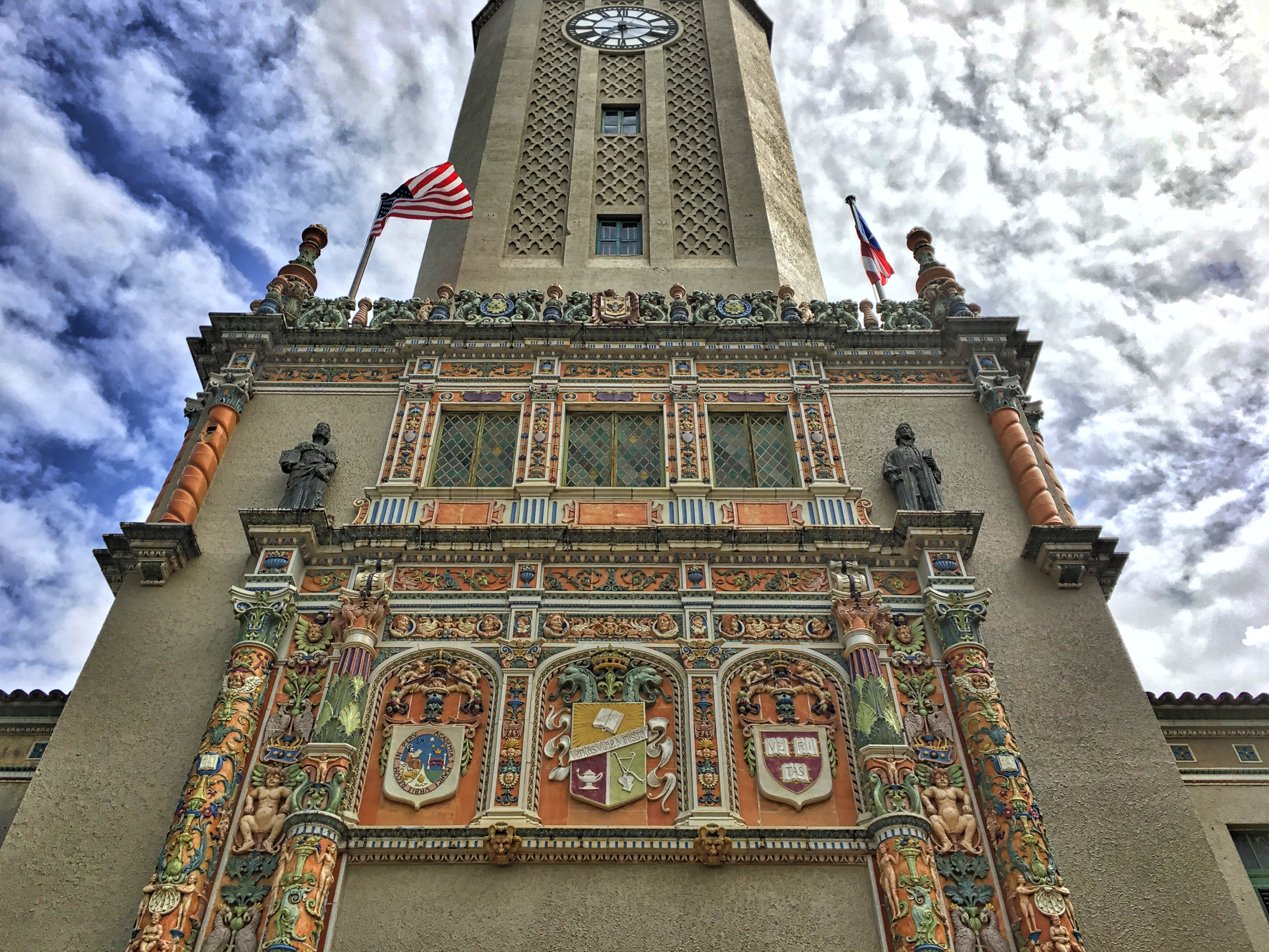
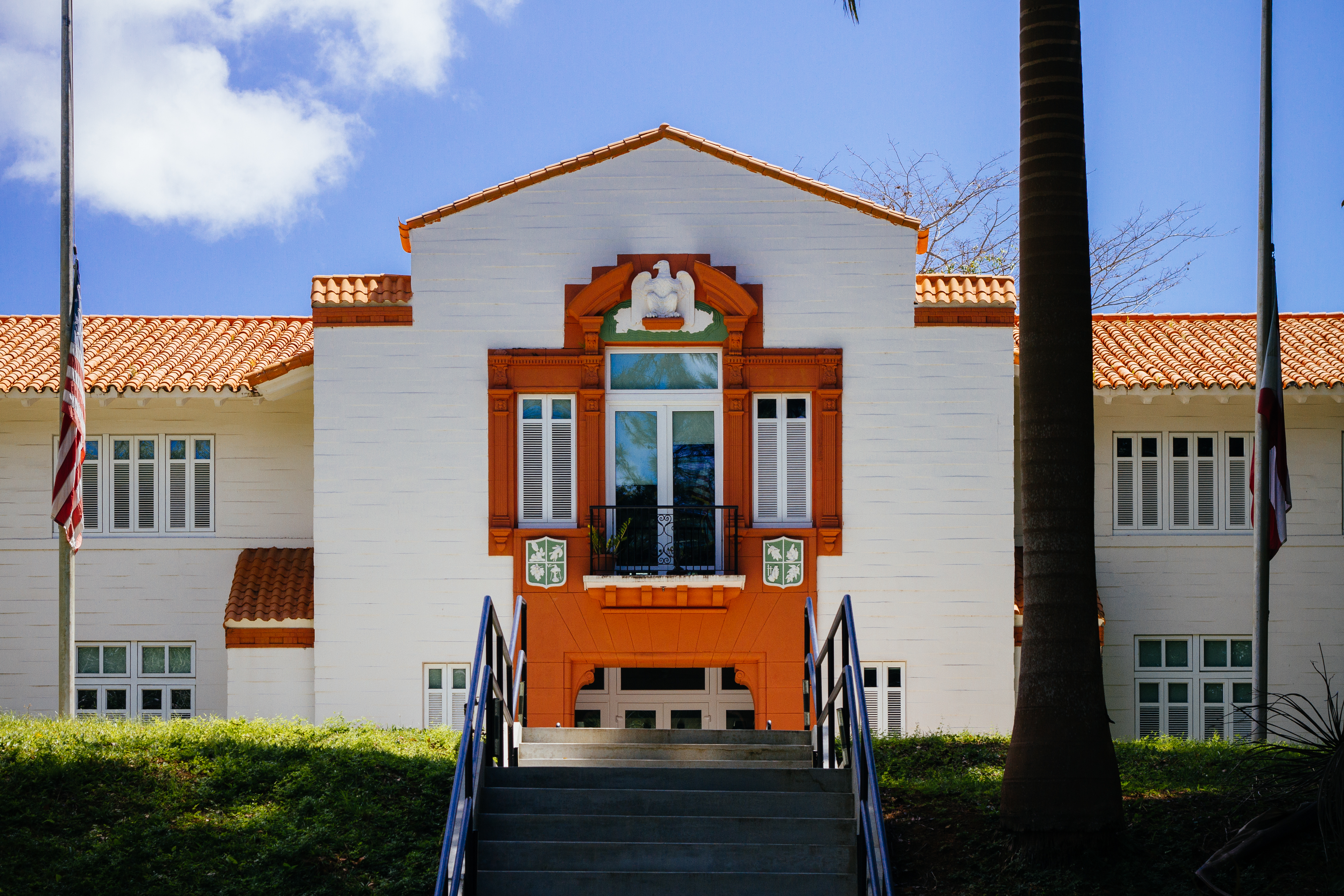
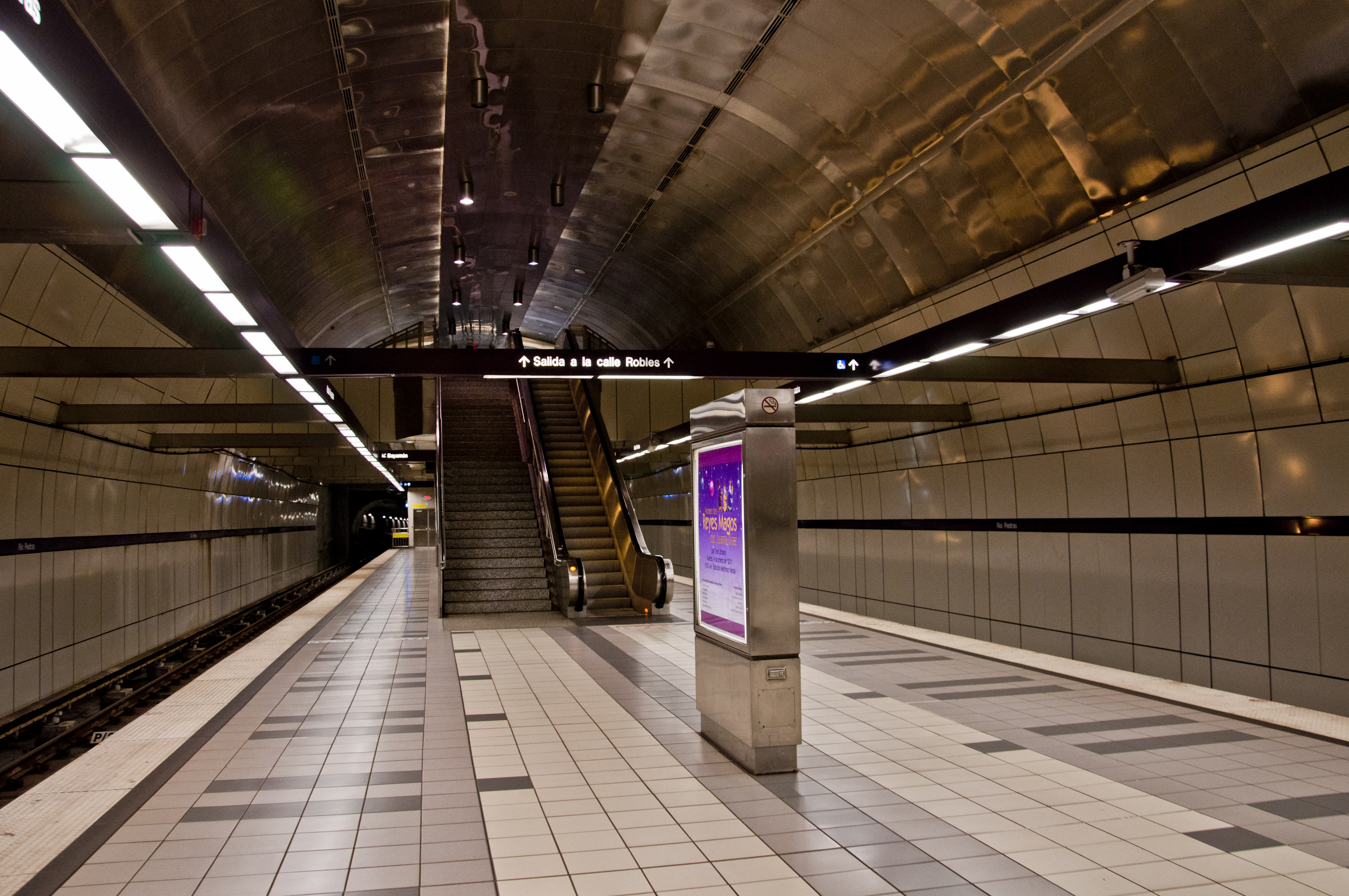
- Nuestra Señora del Pilar Parish La Convalecencia Public Square University of Puerto Rico Roosevelt Tower of UPR Institute of Tropical Forestry in San Juan Botanical Garden Río Piedras Station of Tren Urbano
- Interactive map of Río Piedras
- Coordinates: 18°23′44″N 66°02′45″W
- Commonwealth: Puerto Rico
- Municipality: San Juan
- Barrio: Pueblo, Universidad, Hato Rey Sur, El Cinco, and Monacillo Urbano

Río Piedras (Spanish pronunciation: [ˈrio ˈpjeðɾas]) (Spanish for ''stones river'') is a highly urbanized commercial and residential district in San Juan, the capital municipality of Puerto Rico. Adjacent to the Hato Rey business center and concentrated in the barrios of Pueblo, Universidad, Hato Rey Sur, El Cinco, and Monacillo Urbano, it is about 4 to 7 miles (6.4 to 11.3 km) from the Old San Juan historic quarter, Condado and Isla Verde resort areas, and SJU airport. It has been the home of the main campus of the University of Puerto Rico since 1903, earning the popular name of Ciudad Universitaria (college town). The largest health institution in the archipelago, the Centro Médico de Puerto Rico (Puerto Rico Medical Center), is also located within its limits. Named after the river that flows through it, the Río Piedras (''stones river''), the district was the downtown center of a former municipality with the same name that was merged into San Juan in 1951.

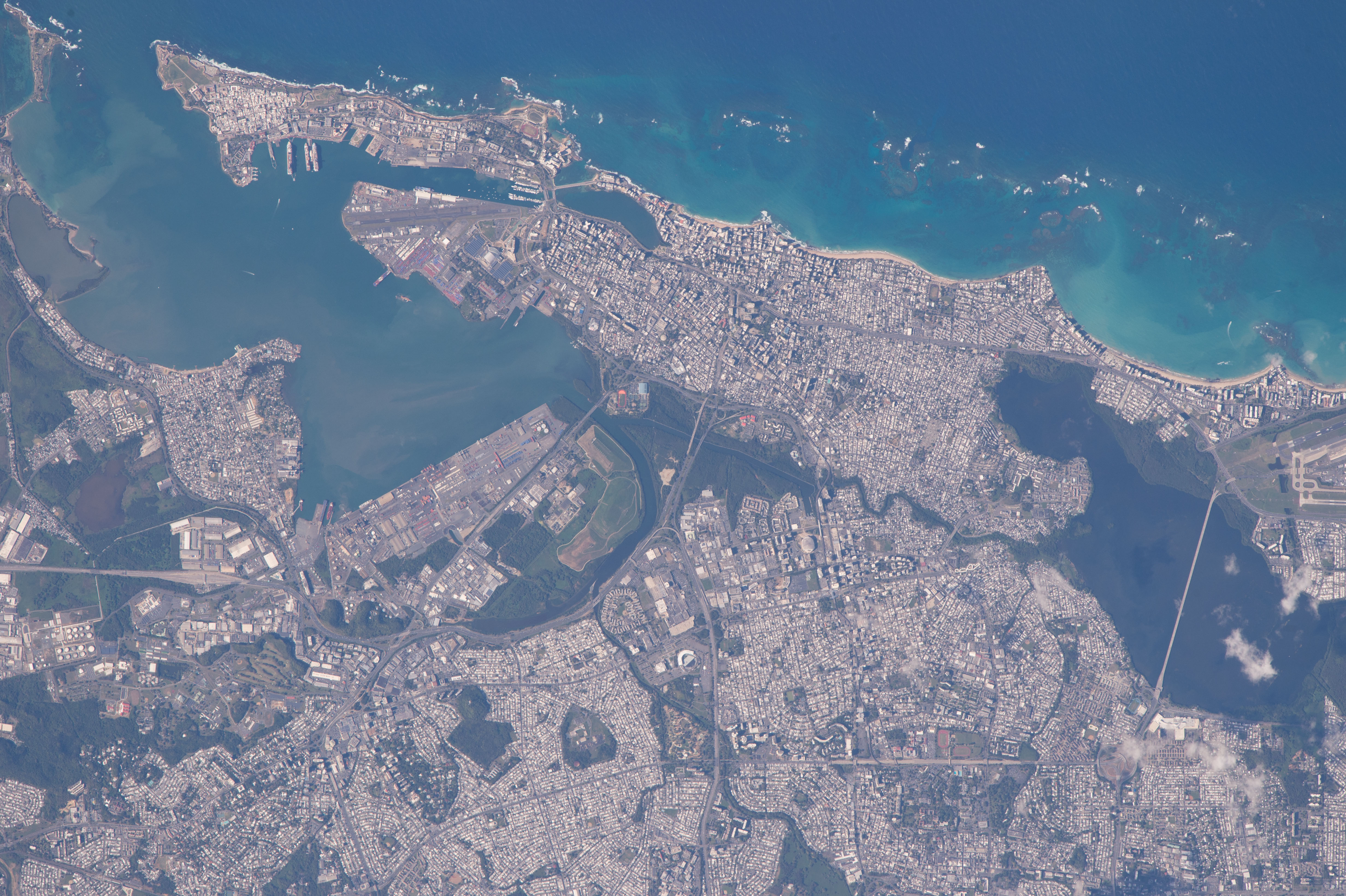
Satellite view from Old San Juan historic quarter (upper left) in San Juan Islet to Isla Verde resort area (upper right) in the Carolina municipality with Río Piedras district visible (lower center), 2012

== Name ==
The district is named Río Piedras (''stones river'') after the Piedras River, which is within its territorial limits. Río Piedras was also the name of the former municipality (1823–1950) for which the district was the downtown and historic center before it was merged with the adjacent municipality of San Juan in 1951.

== History ==
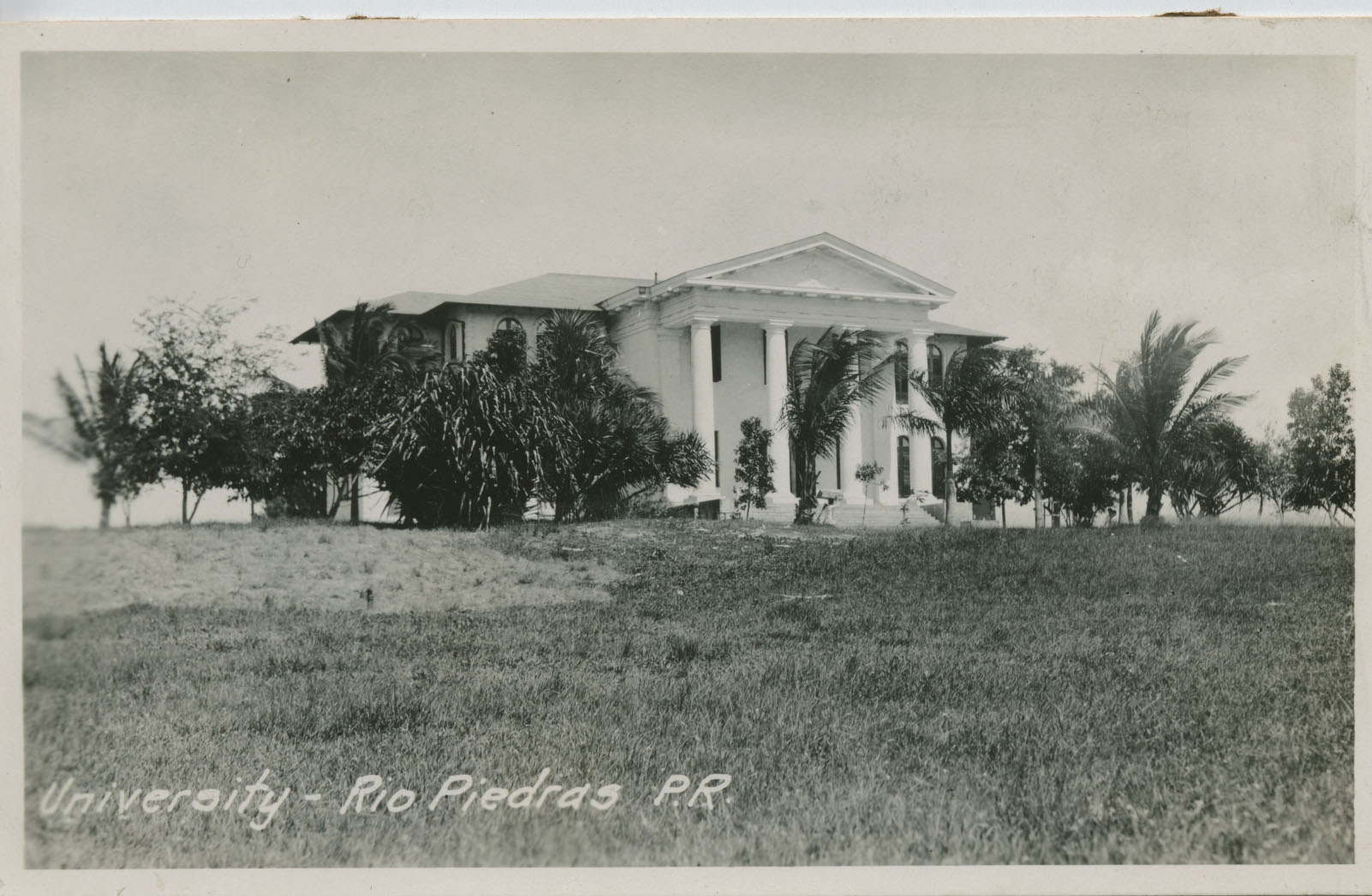
Site of the first University of Puerto Rico building in Río Piedras, 1900–1917

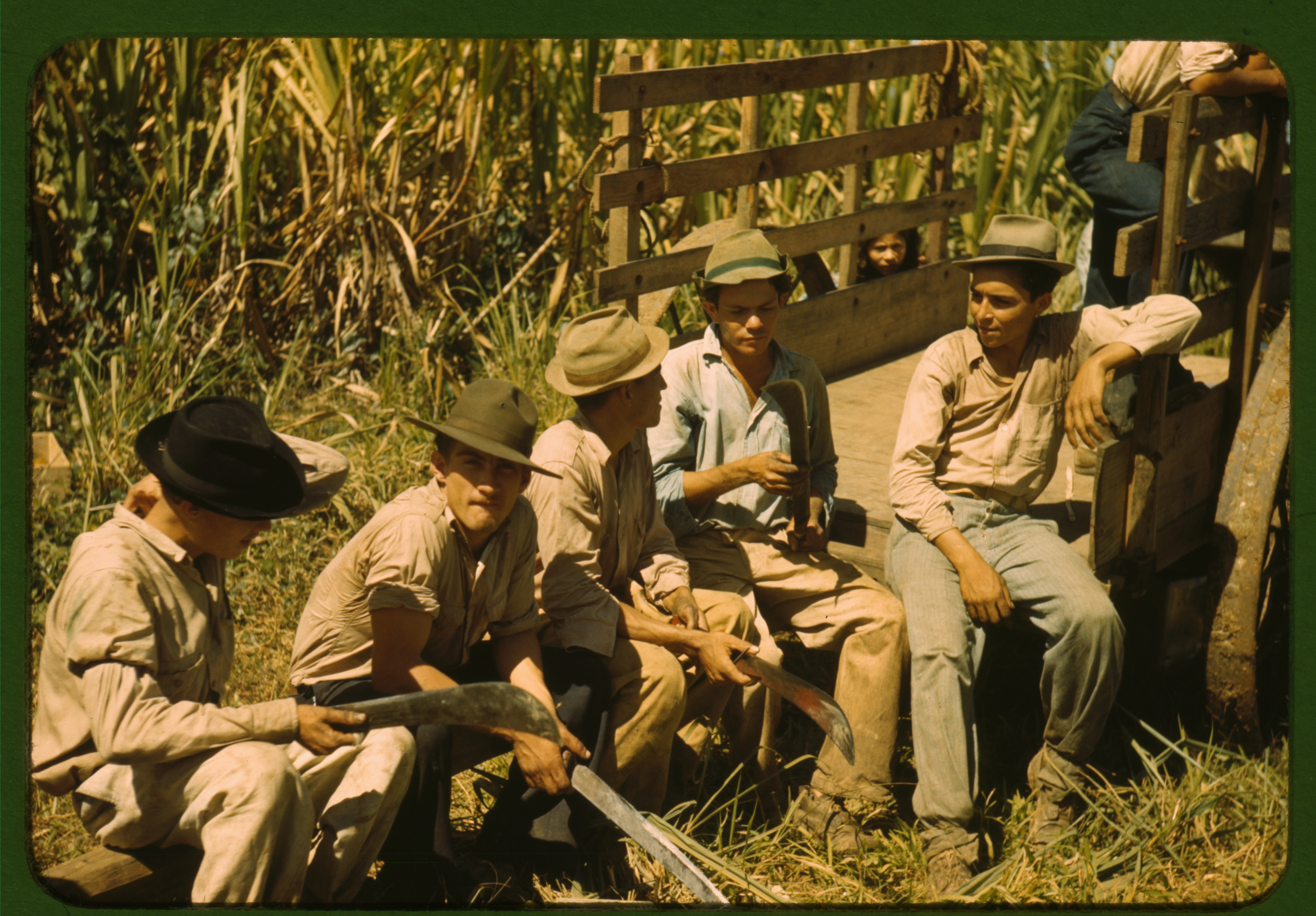
Sugarcane workers resting. Sugarcane was one of the biggest crops throughout the town's history.

The area where Río Piedras is located today was previously settled by the Taíno, and archaeological sites have been uncovered nearby in Carolina. The town was founded as El Roble and was officially recognized by Spanish Governor Juan de Rivera in 1714. It was settled on the intersection of the Piedras River and the Juan Méndez Creek (part of the Puerto Nuevo River basin). The town eventually adopted the name of that river, Pueblo de Nuestra Señora del Pilar de Río Piedras, and was proclaimed a municipality in 1823, when the city hall and plaza (main town square) were built.

During the nineteenth century, most of its territory was used for agricultural and livestock-raising purposes. Sugar cane, cotton and coffee were some of the goods produced during this era at the municipality. A road connecting Río Piedras to San Juan was built during this time, along with the first church, Iglesia Nuestra Señora del Pilar, at the site of the modern town plaza. The Camino Real, precursor to the Carretera Central, connected Río Piedras with Caguas and to southern Puerto Rico, was also built before the end of the century. Its location along the Camino Real between the walled city of San Juan and the rest of the island turned Río Piedras into a commercial hub and junction between the Spanish colonial government and the rest of Puerto Rico.

The University of Puerto Rico was founded in Río Piedras on May 12, 1903 with funds diverted from the former Escuela Normal Industrial (Normal Industrial School). The University of Puerto Rico, Río Piedras Campus, today one of the largest universities in Puerto Rico. The university was a central part of the commercial and residential development of Río Piedras. The University Botanical Gardens are also located in Río Piedras.

=== Incorporation into San Juan ===
The municipality of Río Piedras became part of the capital city of San Juan on July 1, 1951, after the approval of Project 177 by the House of Representatives of Puerto Rico. Following the annexation of Río Piedras, the city of San Juan, quadrupled its former size, becoming the largest city in Puerto Rico. With a population of 143,989 in 1950, Río Piedras was the most populous municipality in Puerto Rico before its consolidation with San Juan. The last mayor of the municipality of Río Piedras was Ángeles Méndez de López Corver. The former downtown area of the municipality is today part of the barrio (district) of Pueblo in San Juan, more popularly known as Río Piedras Antiguo (Old Río Piedras) and Río Piedras Pueblo (downtown Río Piedras), and it still preserves its former city hall, town square or plaza, and its cathedral, Catedral de San Juan Bautista.

=== Paseo de Diego ===
In July 1980, it was revealed by then Mayor Hernán Padilla, that Calle De Diego, one of the roads with the greatest commercial movement and traffic congestion in Río Piedras, would be converted into a Pedestrian Walkway in the following year. Padilla indicated that the construction of the Pedestrian Walkway, which would extend from the street Ferrocarril to Ponce de Leon Avenue, including a portion of Calle del Carmen, would cost around $1.5 million.

On December 5, 1981, the first phase of Paseo De Diego, built by Redondo Construction at a cost of $1,100,000, would be delivered to the Mayor of San Juan before December 18, the date of its official inauguration, four months before the original expected completion time. This would be possible despite the fact that the project had been carried out with the public passing through and shops open. It would have two ornamental fountains, four clocks, attractive light fixtures, and 42 trees that would complement the appearance of Paseo De Diego, which had all the details of a mall, but outdoors. It would officially inaugurate on December 18, of that year.

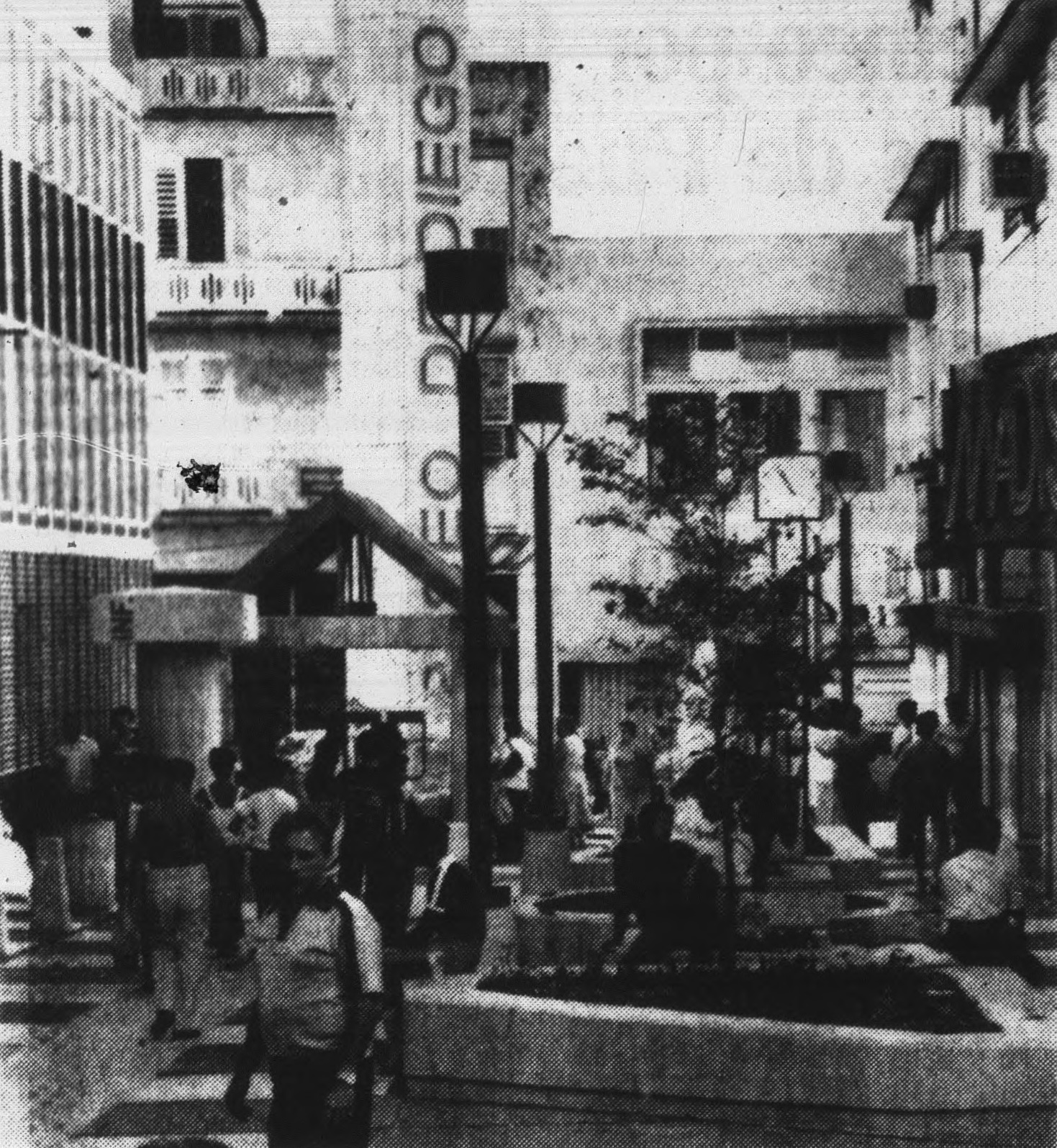
Paseo de Diego on inauguration day in 1981

On November 5, 1983, located on the Paseo de Diego, a 90,000 square foot shopping center Plaza de Diego Mall, would inaugurate with three levels. The first two levels would count with 13 stores, and the third would count with 13 food establishments. It would be developed by Plaza de Diego Shopping Center, Inc., and designed by Huyke, Colón y Asociados.

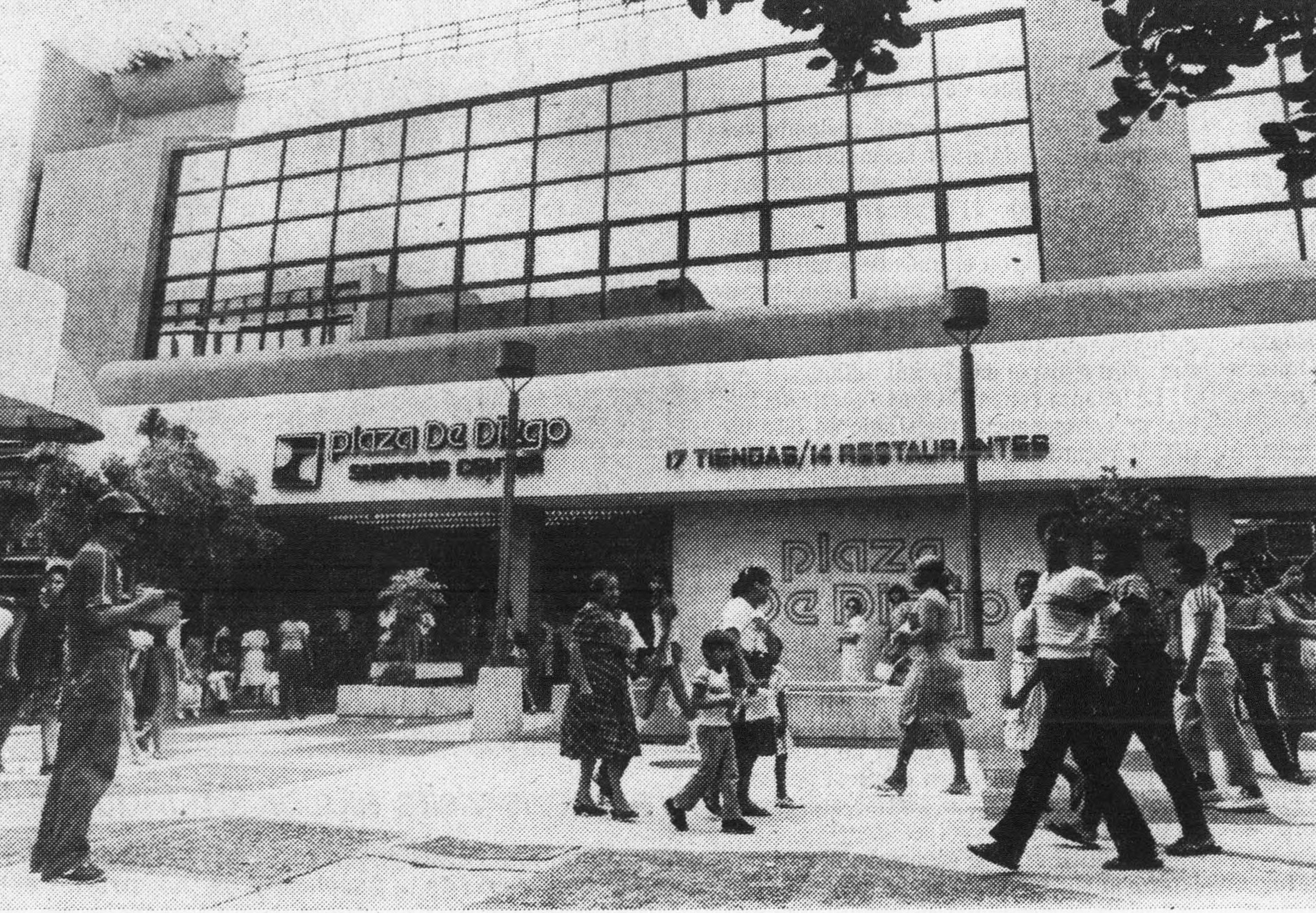
Plaza de Diego Mall in 1984

== Symbols ==
The flag of the former Puerto Rican Municipality of Río Piedras

=== Flag ===
The flag of Río Piedras consists of a yellow cloth with a wavy blue stripe. The stripe has small white stones crossing it, and symbolizes the river that gave its name to the former town. The yellow background represents the sun, progress, and the future.

== Geography and climate ==
The region is mostly flat due to its location in the Northern Coastal Plains of the island. The highest regions are located at the south, mainly in the Caimito and Cupey barrios. The Río Piedras (or Piedras River) which gives name to the area crosses the region.

Climate data for Río Piedras, Puerto Rico (San Juan Botanical Garden) 1991–2020 normals, extremes 1959–present
Month	Jan	Feb	Mar	Apr	May	Jun	Jul	Aug	Sep	Oct	Nov	Dec	Year
Record high °F (°C)	94 (34)	95 (35)	95 (35)	97 (36)	97 (36)	97 (36)	98 (37)	98 (37)	99 (37)	98 (37)	95 (35)	92 (33)	99 (37)
Mean daily maximum °F (°C)	84.8 (29.3)	85.5 (29.7)	86.0 (30.0)	87.1 (30.6)	88.5 (31.4)	90.2 (32.3)	89.9 (32.2)	90.4 (32.4)	90.2 (32.3)	89.6 (32.0)	86.8 (30.4)	85.6 (29.8)	87.9 (31.1)
Daily mean °F (°C)	75.4 (24.1)	75.3 (24.1)	76.0 (24.4)	77.7 (25.4)	79.7 (26.5)	81.0 (27.2)	81.1 (27.3)	81.9 (27.7)	81.4 (27.4)	80.7 (27.1)	78.0 (25.6)	76.6 (24.8)	78.7 (25.9)
Mean daily minimum °F (°C)	66.0 (18.9)	65.1 (18.4)	65.9 (18.8)	68.3 (20.2)	70.8 (21.6)	71.8 (22.1)	72.3 (22.4)	73.3 (22.9)	72.6 (22.6)	71.8 (22.1)	69.2 (20.7)	67.6 (19.8)	69.6 (20.9)
Record low °F (°C)	50 (10)	49 (9)	50 (10)	60 (16)	59 (15)	60 (16)	60 (16)	62 (17)	62 (17)	60 (16)	55 (13)	55 (13)	49 (9)
Average precipitation inches (mm)	5.47 (139)	3.42 (87)	3.95 (100)	5.55 (141)	7.52 (191)	4.59 (117)	8.02 (204)	6.92 (176)	8.30 (211)	7.04 (179)	9.72 (247)	5.39 (137)	75.89 (1,928)
Source: NOAA

== Cityscape ==
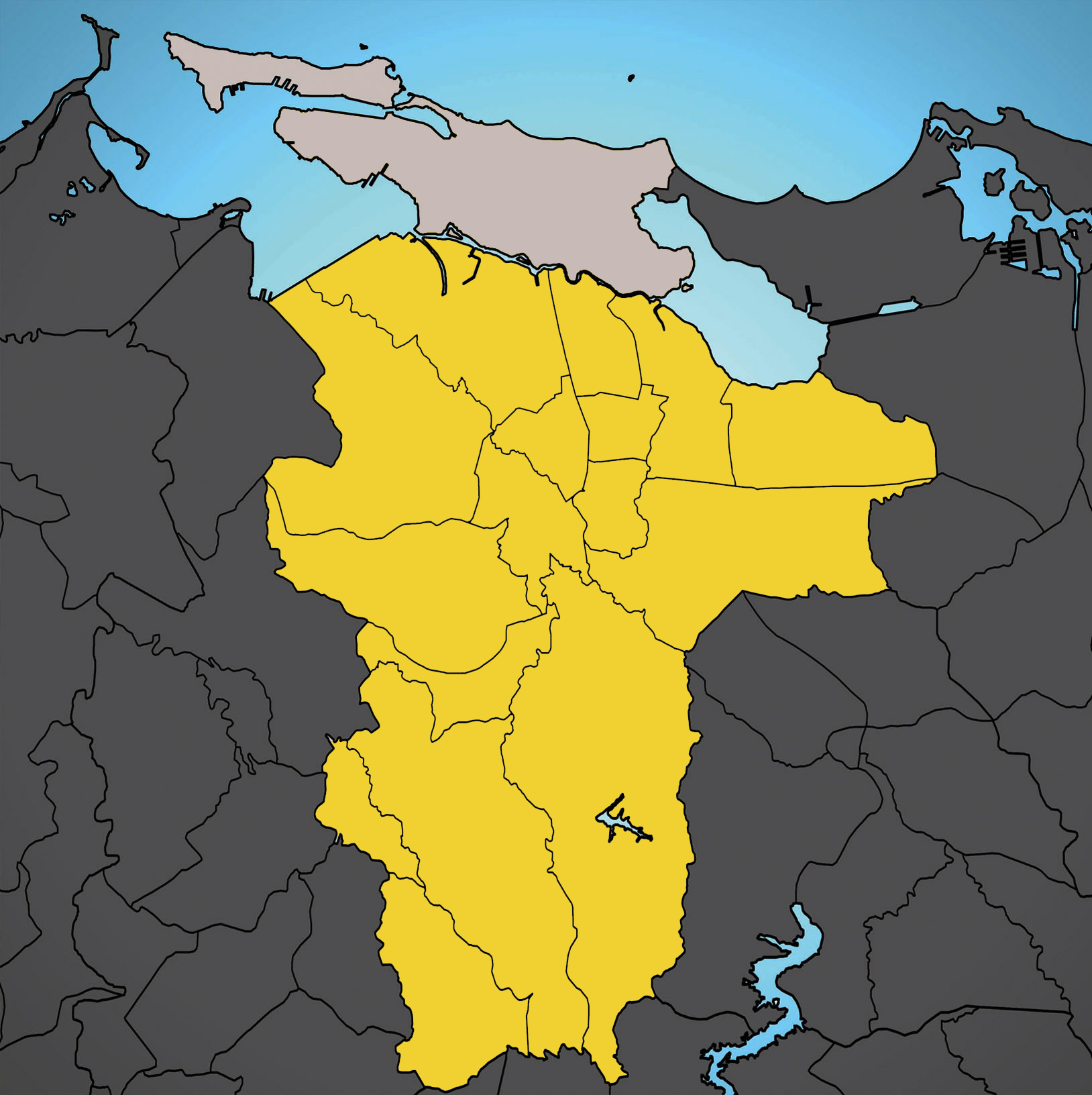
San Juan (light gray) and Río Piedras (yellow) before merging with San Juan

=== Barrios ===
Before it was merged into San Juan in 1948, Río Piedras had the following 12 barrios:

- Buen Consejo
- Capetillo
- El Cinco
- Gobernador Piñero
- Hato Rey Central
- Hato Rey Norte
- Hato Rey Sur
- Oriente
- Río Piedras Antiguo
- Sabana Llana Norte
- Sabana Llana Sur
- Universidad

Buen Consejo, Capetillo, and Río Piedras Antiguo made up the original urban area of the municipality of Río Piedras.

The rural zone, 42% of Río Piedras in 1948, were the following six barrios:

- Caimito
- Cupey
- Monacillo
- Quebrada Arenas
- Sabana Llana Rural
- Tortugo

== Demographics ==
Historical population
Census	Pop.	Note	%±
1900	13,760		—
1910	18,880		37.2%
1920	23,035		22.0%
1930	40,853		77.4%
1940	68,290		67.2%
1950	143,989		110.8%
U.S. Decennial Census; 1899 (shown as 1900) 1910–1930; 1930–1950 1960–2000 2010

== Tourism ==
Tourism spots in Río Piedras include:

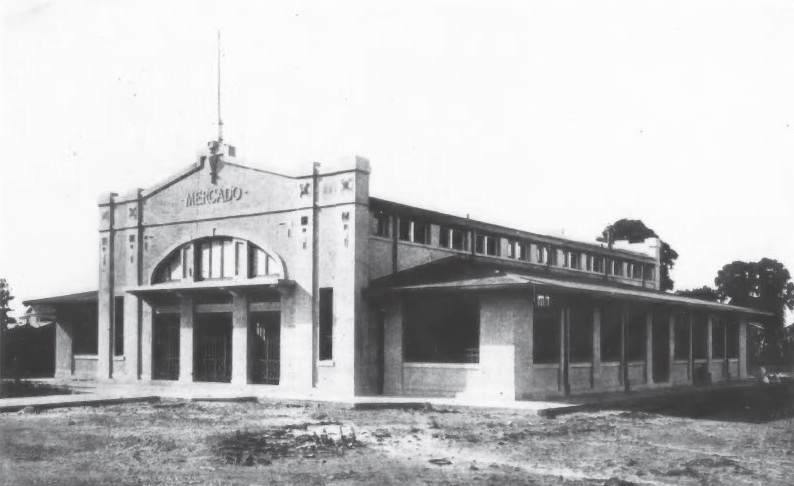
Plaza del Mercado de Río Piedras in 1920

- The Río Piedras campus of the University of Puerto Rico (and its theater, bell tower and museums)
- Casa de Cultura Ruth Hernández Torres, which is a cultural center
- Heladería Georgetti, an iconic ice-cream shop
- El Churro Bar, popular Mexican taqueria and bar
- Plaza del Mercado de Río Piedras, the historic marketplace building in downtown Río Piedras
- El Boricua, a popular gathering place for locals and tourists alike

== Government ==
Río Piedras first mayor was Juan de la Cruz in 1814. The last mayor of the municipality of Río Piedras was Ángeles Méndez de López Corver.

The Puerto Rico Department of Corrections and Rehabilitation operates the Hogar Intermedio para Mujeres in Río Piedras, which opened in 1996.

== Education ==
Río Piedras is perhaps more known for being the site of the main campus of the University of Puerto Rico. Located in downtown Río Piedras, the university has more than 20,000 students enrolled and a faculty of more than 1,000.

Other universities located in what was known as Río Piedras are the Polytechnic University of Puerto Rico and the Interamerican University of Puerto Rico, Metropolitan Campus.

Río Piedras also has several public and private schools distributed through several regions. Public education is handled by the Puerto Rico Department of Education.

== Transportation ==
Río Piedras is served by the Tren Urbano metro system with stations at the University of Puerto Rico and Río Piedras in downtown Río Piedras. Even though these two stations are considered the current stations at Río Piedras, most of the stops of the train in the municipality of San Juan are located in areas that were part of the municipality of Río Piedras prior to 1951.

== Culture ==
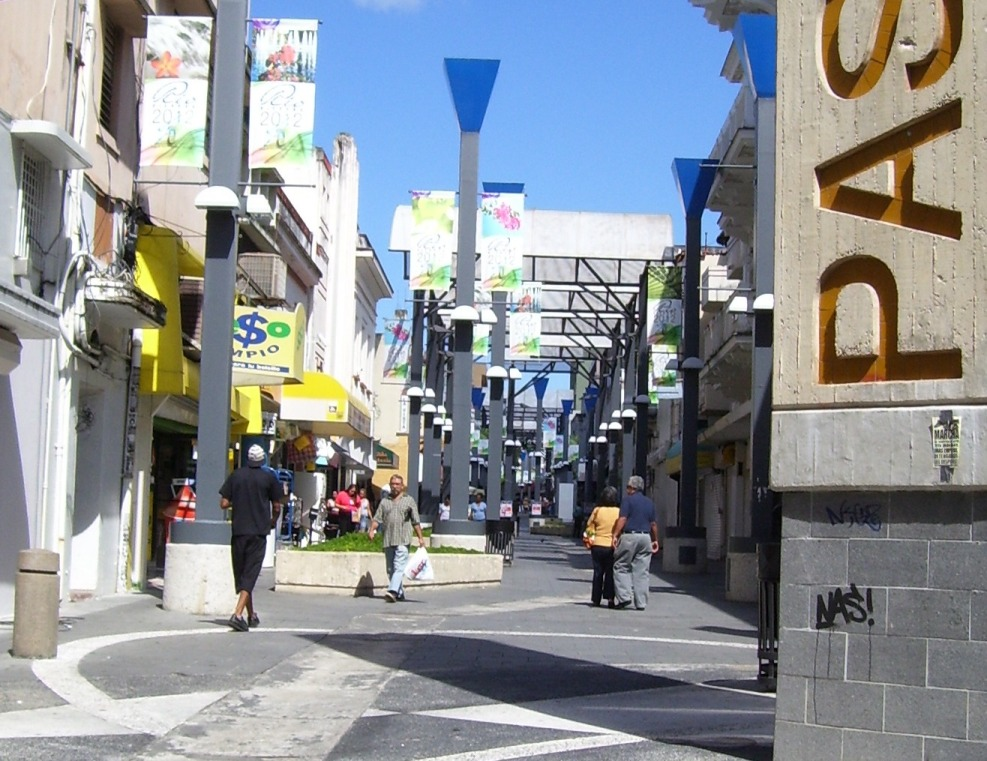
Paseo de Diego

At the heart of Río Piedras lies the Avenida José de Diego, a one-kilometer pedestrianized street with stores and shops. The Río Piedras Plaza del Mercado (the old marketplace) is the largest of its kind on the island and features a series of shops that offer goods and services, and it is also popular with students of the university.

Ponce de León Avenue is popular with bookstores and small theaters and with students, faculty, and intellectuals in the community.

== Notable people ==
- Paul Bamba, boxer
- Luis Torres Díaz, chemist, Lived in the city.
- La India, Salsa singer
- Tito Nieves, Salsa singer
- Joaquin Phoenix, actor
- Frank H. Wadsworth, forester and conservationist
- Chayanne, Latin pop singer
- Ramón Rodríguez, actor known for Will Trent
- José Skinner, writer
- Dickie Thon, professional baseball player.
- Myke Towers, Reggaeton singer and rapper.

== Gallery ==
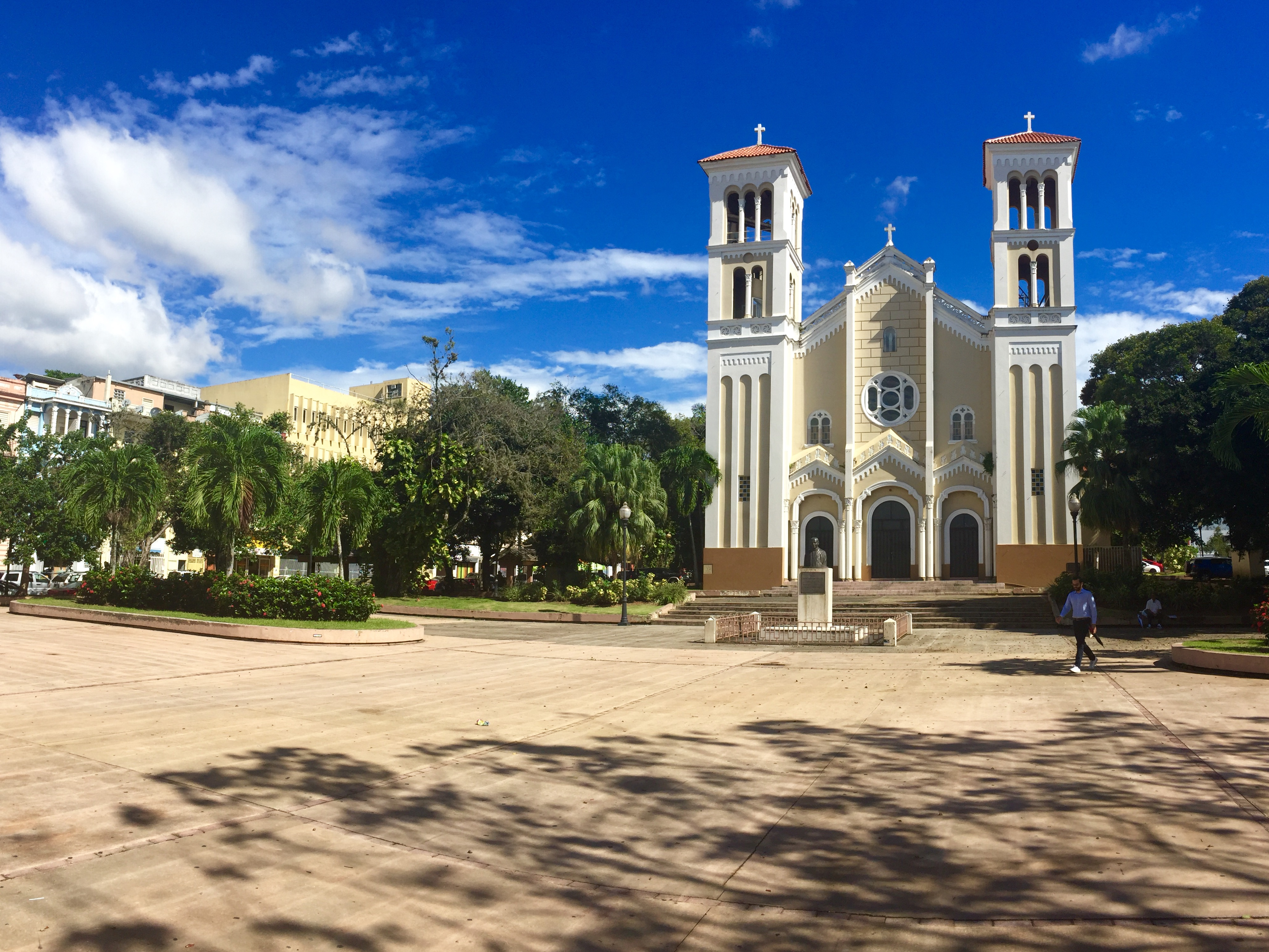
Iglesia Nuestra Señora del Pilar in Río Piedras Pueblo.

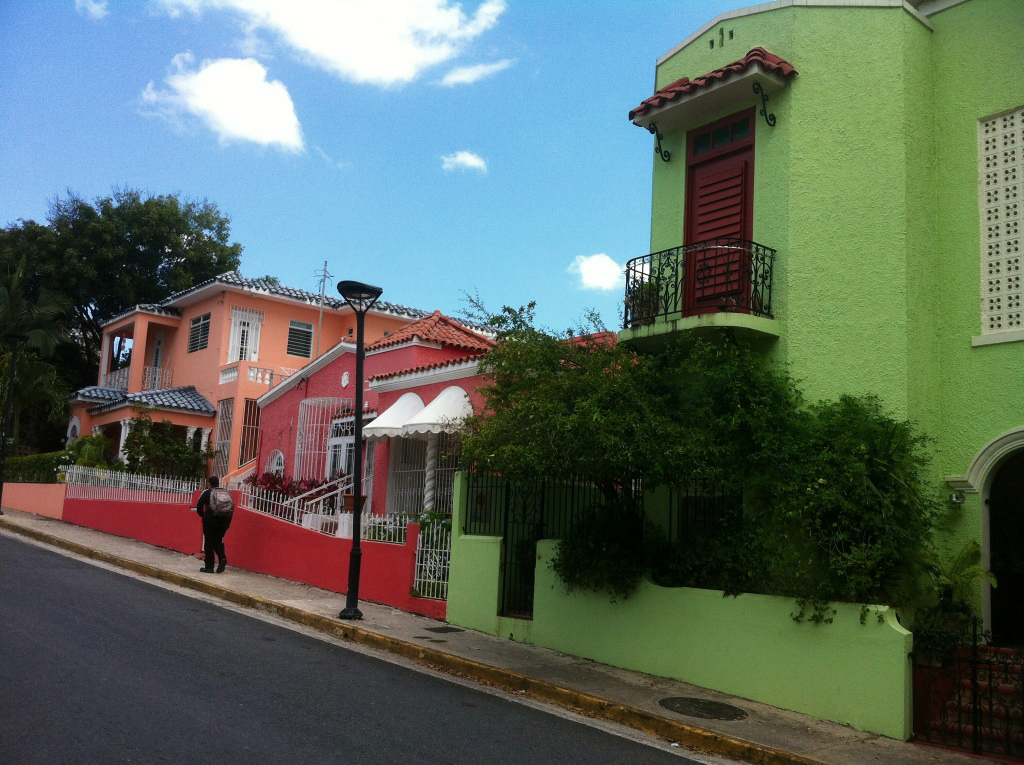
Santa Rita

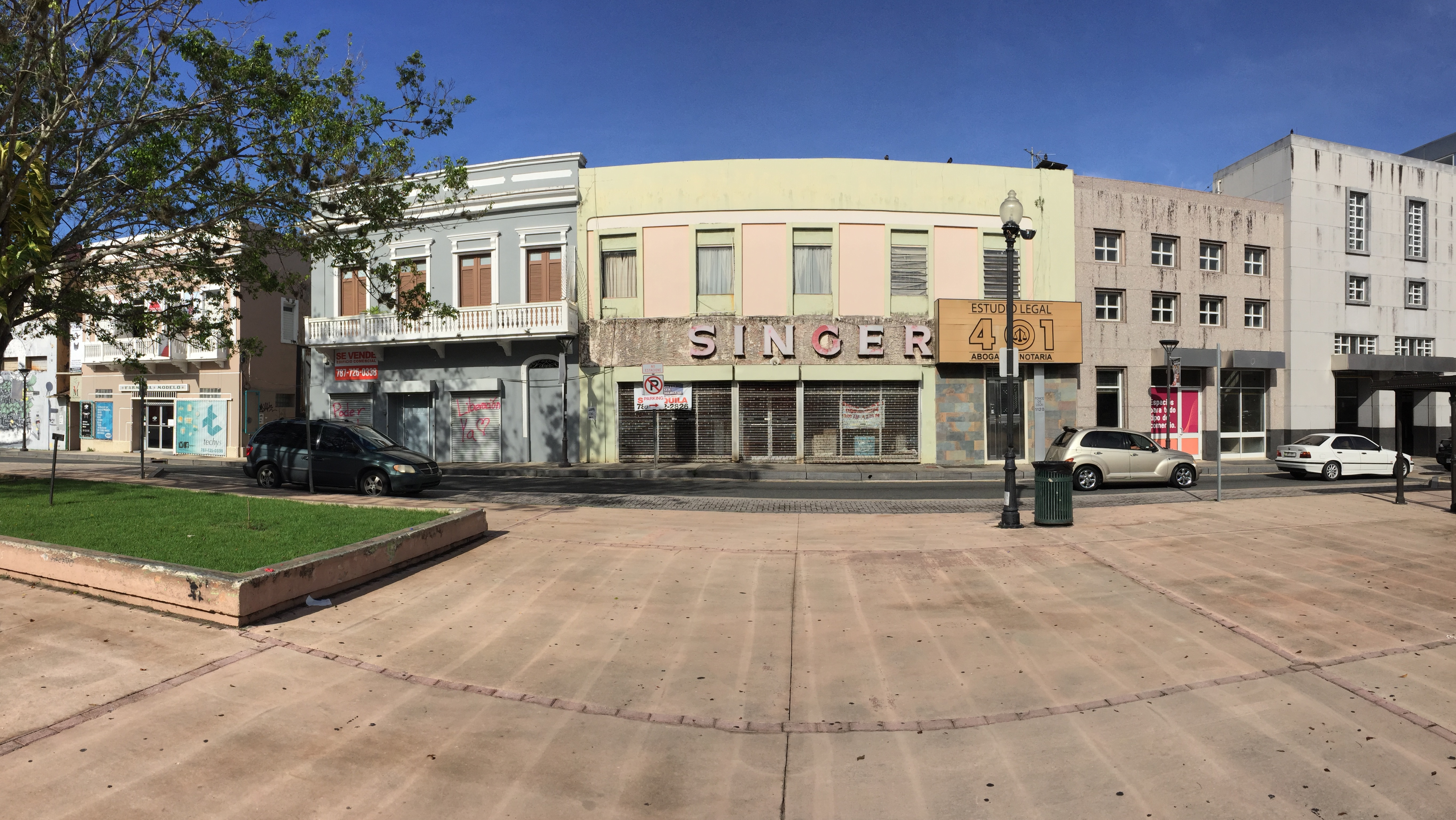
Historic buildings and TU Río Piedras station entrance in Plaza La Convalecencia across Ponce de León Ave.

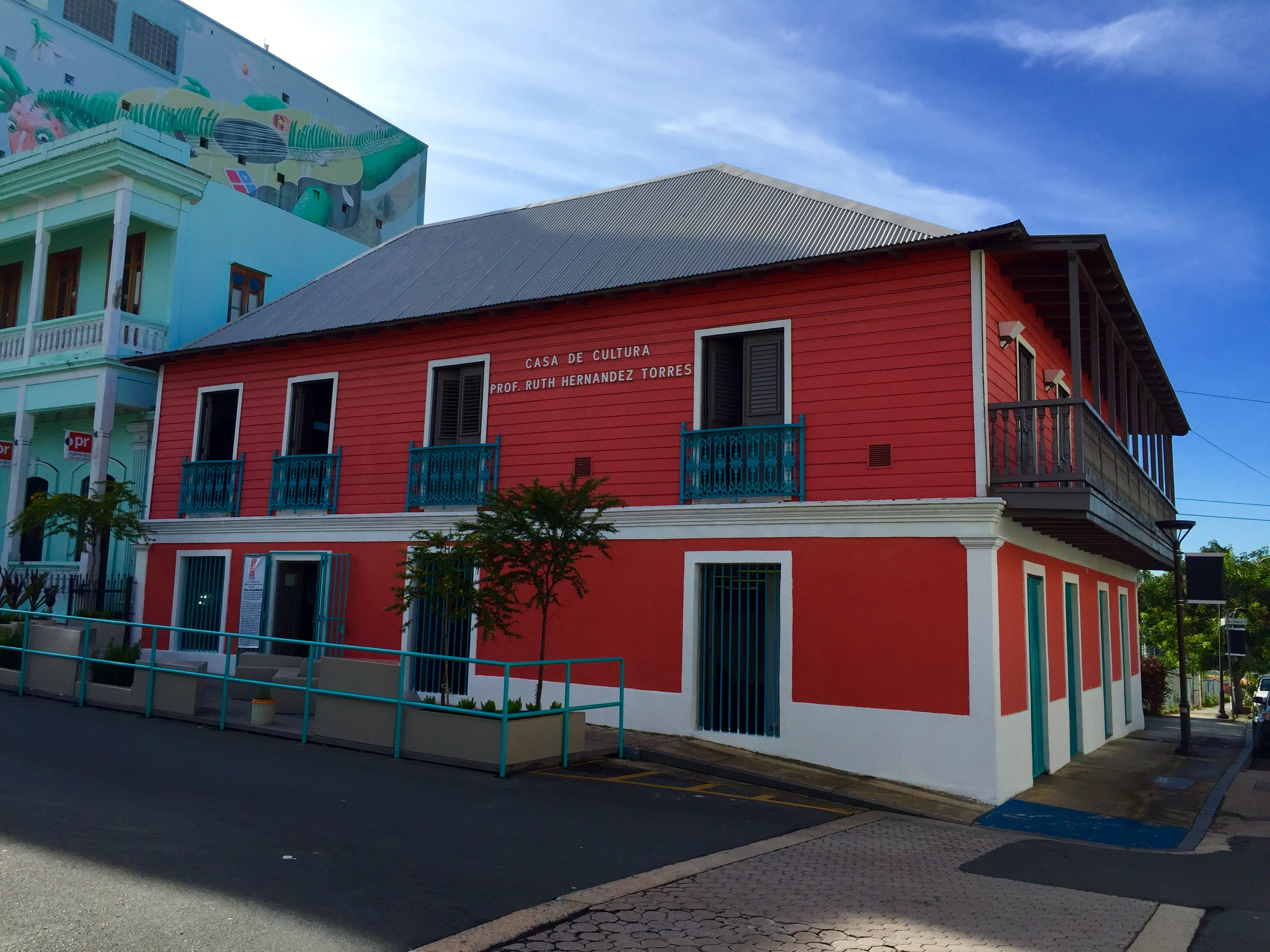
Historic Casa Georgetti in Pueblo.

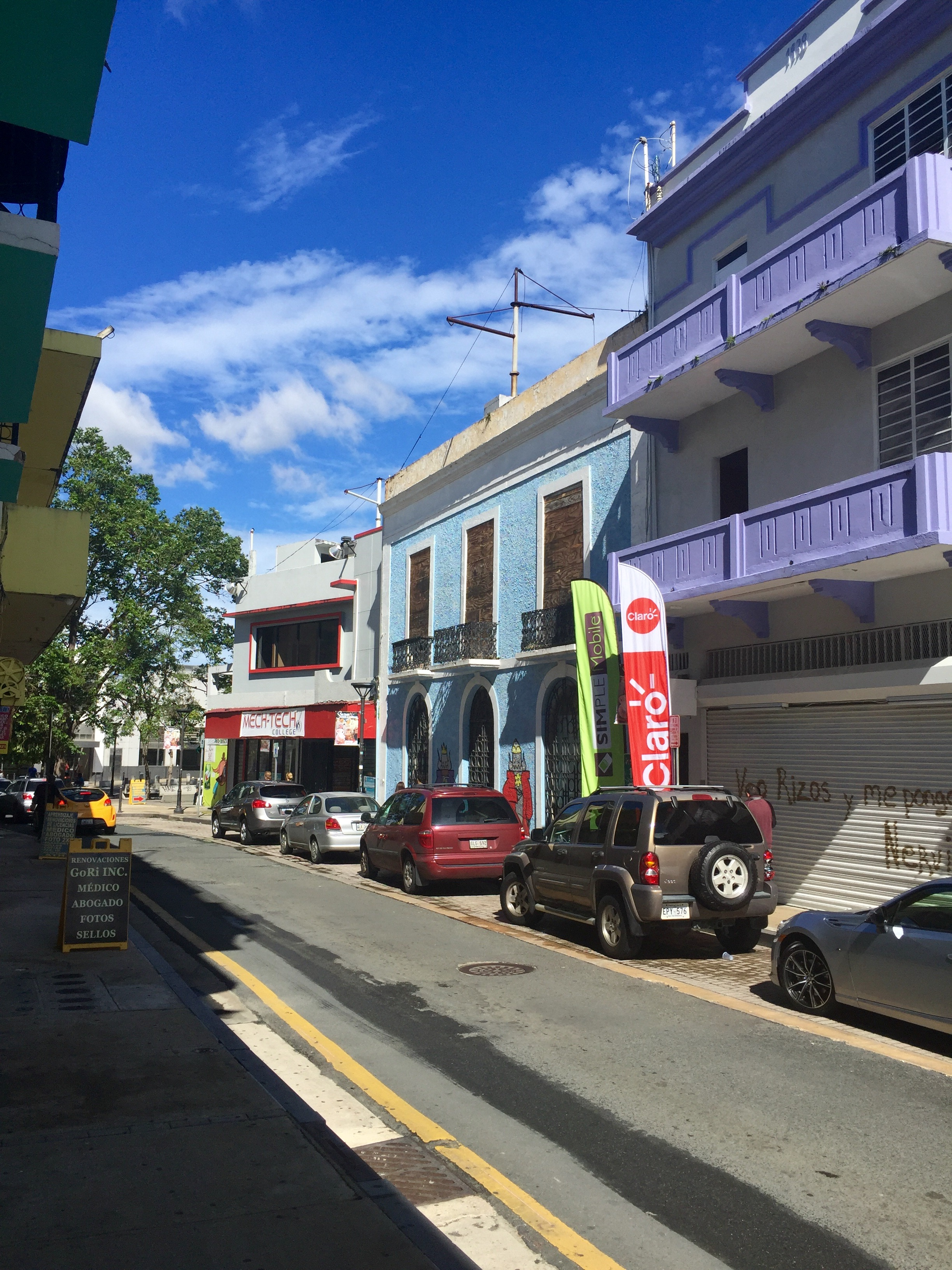
Former city hall building.

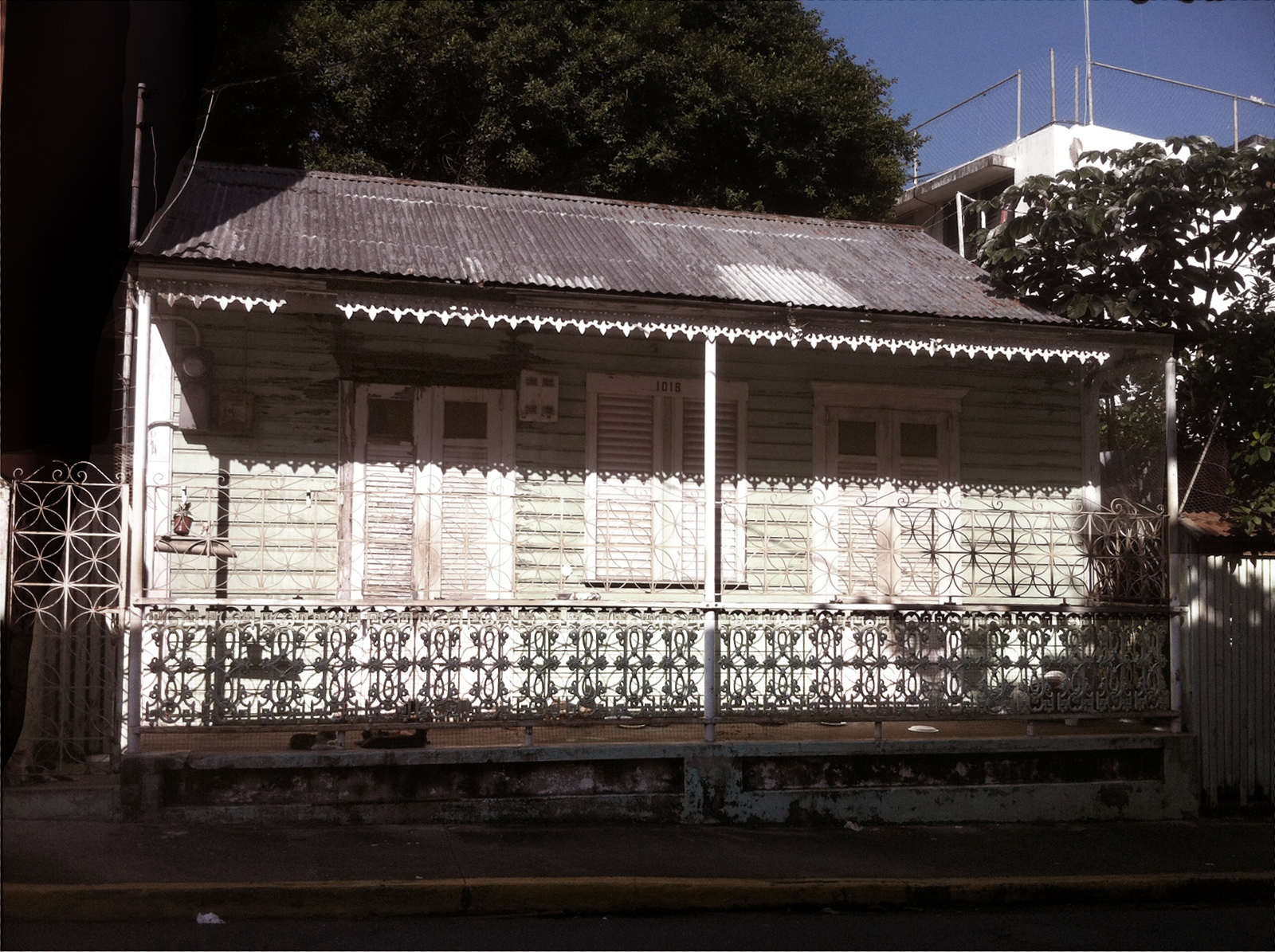
Abandoned Creole-style house on Ferrocarril Street.

== See also ==
- University of Puerto Rico, Río Piedras Campus
- Vilma Reyes
- Humberto Vidal explosion
- List of communities in Puerto Rico
