= Luis Torres Díaz =

Puerto Rican chemist & poet (1897–1988)

- Born: Luis Torres Díaz; September 11, 1897; Peñuelas, Puerto Rico
- Died: 1988 (aged 90–91); San Juan, Puerto Rico
- Education: University of Puerto Rico (BS, MS); Complutense University of Madrid (PharmD)
- Occupations: Chemist, professor and dean of pharmacy

Luis Torres Díaz (September 11, 1897 – 1988) was a Puerto Rican chemist and dean of the College of Pharmacy at the University of Puerto Rico. He is most widely known as the founder of the college's Museum of Pharmacy, the first museum dedicated to the history of a health profession in Puerto Rico. His publications include Breve historia de la farmacia en Puerto Rico / A Concise History of Pharmacy in Puerto Rico. Throughout his life, Torres also published poetry; his poems were collected under the title Cántigas del Hondo Amor y Otros Poemas.

== Early life and education ==
Luis Torres Díaz was born to Vicente Torres Cappa and Isabel Díaz Torres on September 11, 1897, in Peñuelas, Puerto Rico. He graduated from the Escuela Superior in Ponce and between 1919 and 1923 obtained degrees in chemistry and pharmacy from the University of Puerto Rico. He pursued additional graduate studies in pharmacy and chemistry at the University of Michigan and Columbia University in the United States, and earned a doctorate in pharmacy from the Complutense University of Madrid with a thesis examining pharmaceutical practices in Puerto Rico, titled "La farmacia puertorriqueña bajo el influjo de dos culturas".

== Career ==
In 1919 to 1921, Torres was a partner in a pharmaceutical company in Río Piedras. From 1923 to 1925, he taught science at the Escuela Superior in Fajardo.

In 1925, he became an instructor in chemistry at the University of Puerto Rico, where he spent the remainder of his career. In 1928 he transferred to the College of Pharmacy, where he became an assistant professor in 1938 and in 1940 became a full professor and dean. He retired in 1968 after 43 years at the university and was named dean emeritus.

While dean of the College of Pharmacy, Torres established its library and served as chairman of the Puerto Rico Auxiliary Commission for the Revision of the United States Pharmacopeia, and as a committee member for the organization of the Pan-American Congress on Pharmaceutical Education held at Havana, Cuba, in December 1948; he was appointed honorary president of the Puerto Rican committee.

=== Pharmacy museum ===
Torres was an avid historian of pharmaceutical studies, and in 1947 he acquired a significant collection of original materials, which became the core of the Museum of Pharmacy at the University of Puerto Rico. The museum was established at Torres' urging in 1954 and was the first museum of a health profession on the island. It was renamed for him to the Luis Torres Díaz Pharmacy Museum of the School of Pharmacy; now located on the University of Puerto Rico Medical Sciences Campus in San Juan, it has since amalgamated with the Medicinal and Poisonous Plants Garden and become the Museum of Pharmacy and Medicinal Plants (Museo de Farmacia y Plantas Medicinales). Nearly half of its collection is housed in Luis Torres Díaz Hall on the first floor of the Pharmacy and Students Deanship building.

=== Scientific publications ===
Torres wrote a number of scientific books and articles, including Estudio Preliminar de una Dieta Usual en Puerto Rico, El Cobre y El Manganeso en La formación de la Hemoglobina, Estudio Fitoquímico de La Túa -Túa, and Breve historia de la farmacia en Puerto Rico / A Concise History of Pharmacy in Puerto Rico, published in Spanish and English in 1951.

In 1957, Torres wrote an article titled Pharmaceutical Education in Puerto Rico, published in the Journal of the American Pharmaceutical Association. In 1974, Torres Diaz published a Puerto Rican pharmaceutical bibliography with commentary. The bibliography includes works written during three periods of Puerto Rican history. Early, Spanish Colonial, and 1898 change of sovereignty.

== Poetry ==
Torres also wrote poetry, and is considered a member of Puerto Rico's modernist school. His poems appeared in periodicals including El Mundo and Puerto Rico Ilustrado and in 1983 were published as a collected volume titled Cántigas del Hondo Amor y Otros Poemas.

== Personal life and death ==
Torres married Emma Luisa Vidal in 1923; they had three children. He died in 1988 in San Juan.
