= José Skinner =

American author

José Skinner (born 1956) is an American writer of novels, short stories, essays, and translations.

== Early life and education ==
José Skinner was born in Río Piedras, Puerto Rico and grew up in Mexico City. He attended the Universidad Iberoamericana and worked as a Spanish-English interpreter and translator in the courts of New Mexico before earning his MFA in fiction at the Iowa Writers' Workshop.

== Career ==
He taught creative writing and directed the bilingual MFA program at the University of Texas–Pan American in the Lower Rio Grande Valley. He has been a fellow at the Virginia Center for the Creative Arts and was inducted into the Texas Institute of Letters in 2018.

His novel The Search Committee was published by Arte Público Press in 2025. Kirkus Reviews called it "a dramatic and often darkly humorous debut thriller" that "lingers after its final page." The Texas Observer wrote, "Skinner’s breezy lack of pretense is refreshing for a book taking on such fraught topics as narco-violence and the U.S.-Mexico border, but his humility disguises real sophistication. Skinner knows this material inside and out, and he’s delivered a convincing vision of the Texas-Mexico borderlands in these dark times." CrimeReads named The Search Committee a Best Book of 2025, and it won the Texas Institute of Letters' 2026 Jesse H. Jones Award for Best Book of Fiction.

His first collection, Flight and Other Stories, was a Barnes & Noble Discover Great New Writers selection and a finalist for the Western States Book Award for Fiction and the Drue Heinz Literature Prize. Publishers Weekly called the collection "varied, well-crafted and frequently daring." Latino Literature Hall of Fame member Luis Alberto Urrea said, "José Skinner’s got a book called Flight. He’s my great hope. There’s something really remarkable and grand going on in his work, his fiction."

Of his second collection, The Tombstone Race, Kirkus Reviews said, "With verisimilitude, compassion, and a surprising amount of nobility, Skinner navigates the mean streets of New Mexico with cunning and grace." Latina Magazine wrote, "The authenticity of José Skinner's experiences as a Spanish/English interpreter in the courtrooms of the Southwest hit harder than an NFL linebacker." In Western American Literature, Melina Vizcaíno-Alemán wrote, "By carefully balancing an artistic appreciation of the landscape with an awareness of social reality, Skinner presents a thought- provoking collection about a diverse people and place mired in regional development." Rigoberto González of NBC News wrote, "José Skinner's long-awaited second collection measures up to, and indeed surpasses, his critically-acclaimed debut 'Flight and Other Stories." The book was a Writers' League of Texas Discovery Prize Winner in 2016.

His fiction has appeared in Witness, Third Coast, Colorado Review, and many other literary magazines, and his nonfiction in Our Lost Border: Essays on Life Amid the Narco-Violence, Monthly Review, The Progressive, El Nuevo Mexicano, and The Millennium Reader. He has reviewed books for The Texas Observer and American Book Review.

In 2023, he and Melynda Nuss founded Alienated Majesty Bookstore in Austin, Texas.

== Bibliography ==
=== Books ===
Flight and Other Stories (Reno: University of Nevada Press, 2001)

The Tombstone Race (Albuquerque: University of New Mexico Press, 2016)

The Search Committee (Houston: Arte Público, 2025)

=== Selected Stories ===
"Peons." Isthmus 6, 2017 (Distinguished Story of 2017, Best American Short Stories)

"Looking Out" and "The Edge" Solstice Literary Magazine 2010, 2012 Looking Out The Edge

"Plots" The Florida Review36:1, 2011 (Finalist, Florida Review Award in Fiction)

"Crypto" Other Voices 44, 2006

"Counting Coup" Clackamas Literary Review Vol X, 2006

"The Extra" Third Coast 21, 2005

"Age of Copper" Witness 15.1, 2001

"Careful" Boulevard 31.1-2, 2000

"Backing Up" Colorado Review 27.2, 2000

"Cop" Bilingual Review/Revista Bilingüe 25.2, 2000

"Mentor" Red Rock Review 1.5, 1999

"Weeds" Western Humanities Review 52.2, 1998

"Hands" Blue Mesa Review 10, 1998

"Lockjaw" Quarterly West 45, 1998

"Pickup" Descant 34.1, 1995

"Spring." Saguaro 9, 1994. Reprinted in translation in Tameme: New Literature of North America/Nueva Literatura de Norteamérica 3, 2003

"Boxed in by Borges." Coe Review 25th Anniversary Special Experimental Issue

=== Stories in Anthologies ===
"The Edge." In Sol Lit Selects: Five Years of Diverse Voices, 2018 Solstice Literary Magazine's selection of the best writing published in its first five years.

"All About Balls." In Las Vegas Noir (New York: Akashic Books, 2008)

"Naked City." In In the Shadow of the Strip: Las Vegas Stories (Reno: University of Nevada Press, 2003)

"Qué Será." In Sol: English Writing in Mexico (San Miguel de Allende: Sol, 2012)

"Sus Canciones." In Antología Canicular (McAllen: Campamocha Editora, 2009)
