= Plaza De Diego Mall =

Plaza de Diego Mall
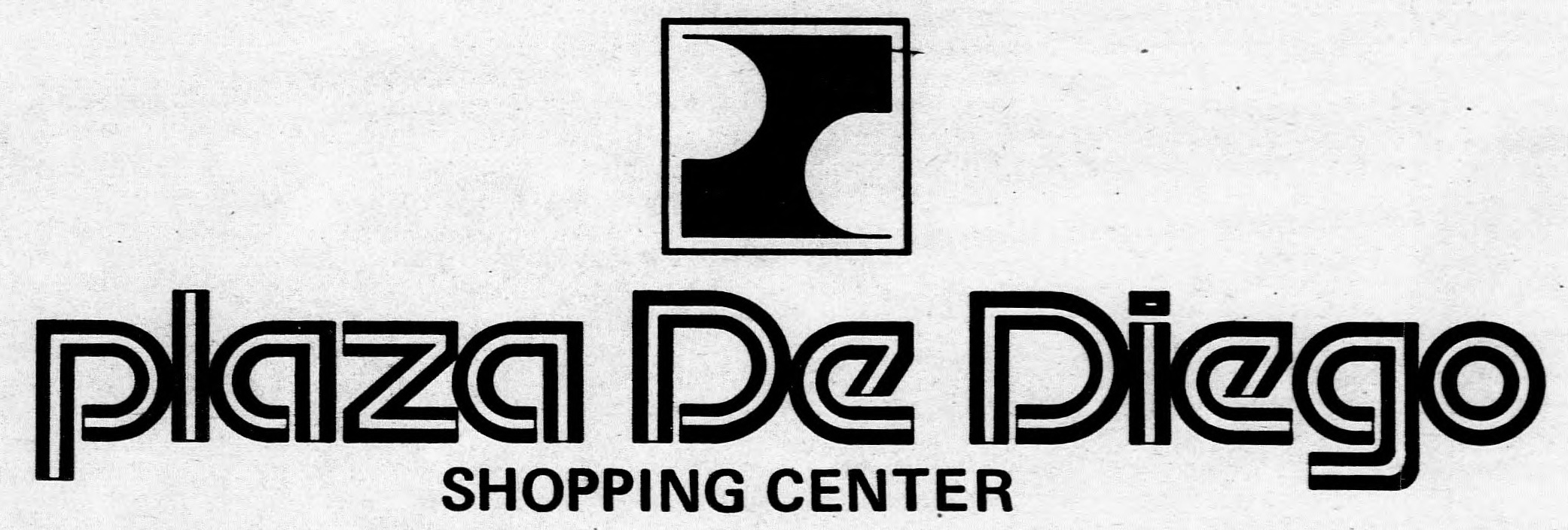
- Mall logo from 1985
- Location: Río Piedras, Puerto Rico
- Coordinates: 18.399253°N 66.050647°W
- Address: 59-61 Paseo de Diego
- Opened: 5 November 1983
- Closed: By 2014
- Developer: Plaza de Diego Shopping Center, Inc.
- Architect: Huyke, Colón y Asociados
- Num. of stores: 40 (at peak)
- Num. of anchor tenants: 1 (at peak)
- Floor area: 140,000 sq ft (13,000 m^{2})
- Floors: 4

Plaza de Diego Mall was an enclosed shopping mall formerly located in the Paseo de Diego area of Río Piedras, Puerto Rico. At its peak it had 40+ establishments, and was anchored by a Goody’s Department Store. The mall had been closed for several years by 2014 and it would be demolished in 2020, then redeveloped and turned into a housing project named De Diego Village which would officially inaugurate in 2023.

== History ==
=== Opening and success: 1980s ===
On November 5, 1983, the 90,000 square foot Plaza de Diego Mall would inaugurate with three levels. The first two levels would count with 13 stores, and the third would count with 13 food establishments. It would be developed by then owners Plaza de Diego Shopping Center, Inc., and designed by Huyke, Colón y Asociados.

In January 1984, a Pearle Vision Center would open on the second level of the mall.

On May 12, 1984, it was reported that at a Capri department store, a woman had been seen loitering shortly before a fire broke out in the fabric department of said store. Damages totaled $600. There were also two attempts done in the women's bathroom at Plaza de Diego Mall, which was adjacent to the Capri department store. All the fires were extinguished almost instantly, by employees of the establishments.

In August 1984, it was announced that the mall had plans to expand its facilities to add some 40 stores to the already existing 17 stores at the mall had and create a family entertainment center that, in addition to its then area of 14 fast food restaurants at its food court “El Comedor”, would include three cinemas and a bowling alley. The expansion of the mall, which would cost about $14 million, would also include the construction of a seven-story parking garage with room for 700 cars, according to the vice president of Plaza De Diego, Inc., Rafael Figueroa. With these improvements, Plaza De Diego hoped to capture the support of the 100,000 people who, according to studies, passed daily through the center of Río Piedras, in the area of Paseo De Diego up to Vallejo Street, in front of the Plaza del Mercado. Figueroa explained that the potential market was enormous at the time because Río Piedras was an exceptional commercial area. Regarding the expansion project of Plaza de Diego, Figueroa said he expected it to be completed by mid-1986. Preliminary plans, drawn up by the architectural firm Huyke, Colón y Asociados, call for Plaza de Diego to consist of four levels, possibly with a 40,000-foot department store, panoramic elevators and some bridges that would link the parking building to the mall. Figueroa pointed out that the project would be financed by Caguas Federal Savings, which would contribute about $10 million. Another $4 million in UDAG funds was expected to be raised. They were currently in the stage of renting the commercial premises, which would also raise something in advance to finance the project. The construction work on the project was expected to begin in June 1985.

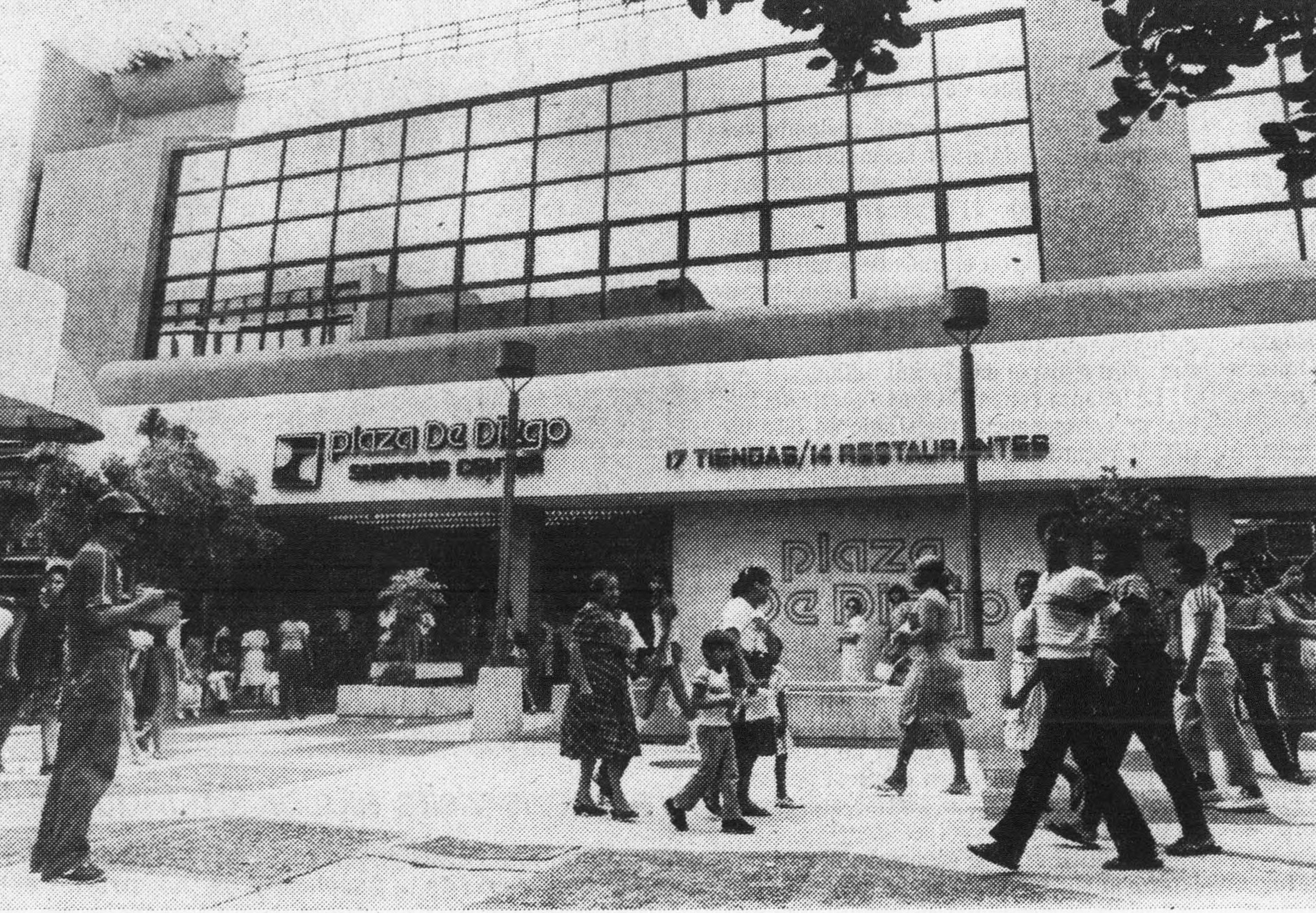
Exterior advertising establishments in 1984

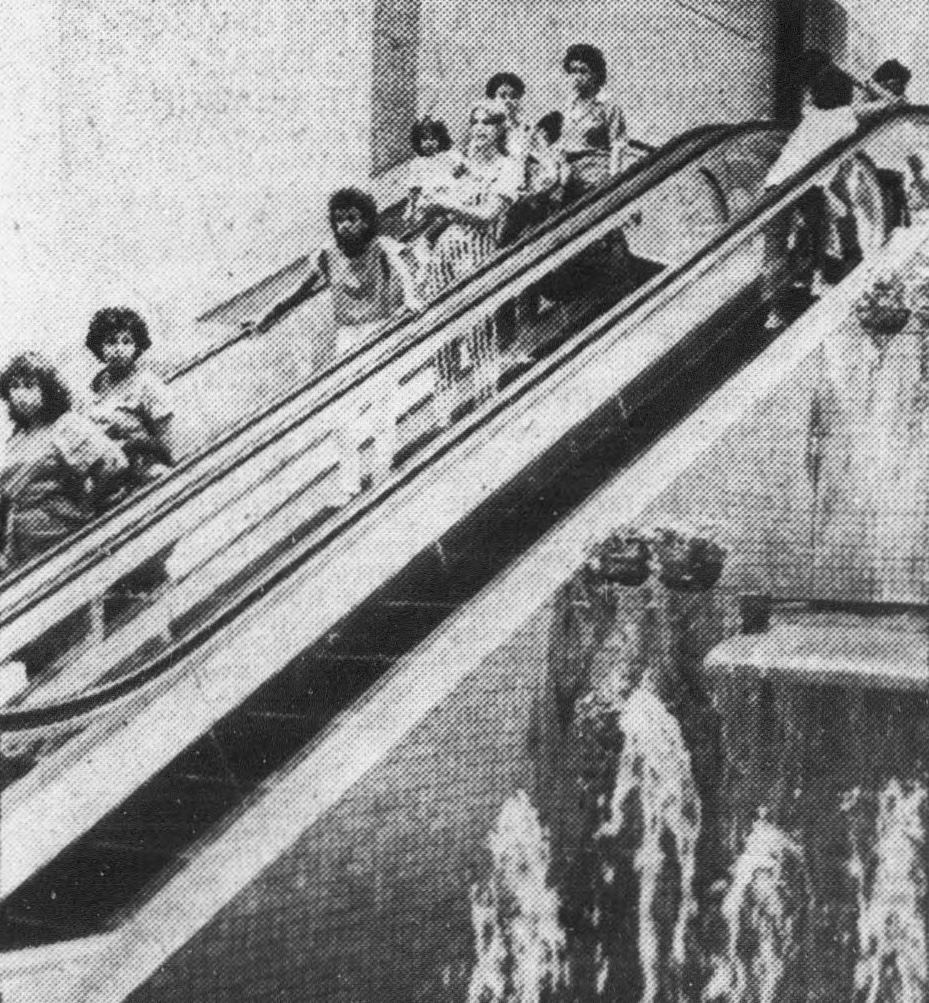
Fountain at the mall in 1984

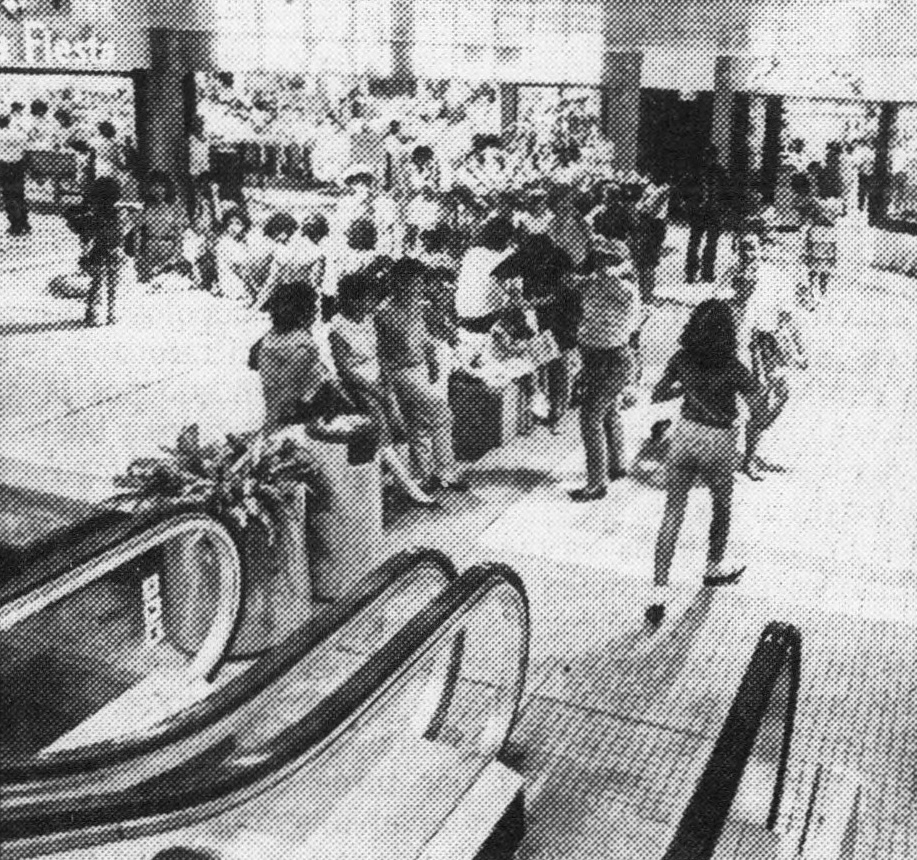
Stores at the mall in 1984

In February 1985, a “Arias” men's clothing store would come to the mall.

In May 1985, Plaza de Diego would advertise its new expansion with 40 new spaces in between 500 and 10,000 square feet for new businesses. In addition, it would advertise two spaces one being 20,500 square feet, the other 41,500 square feet, and 8 office spaces in between 1,000 and 6,000 square feet.

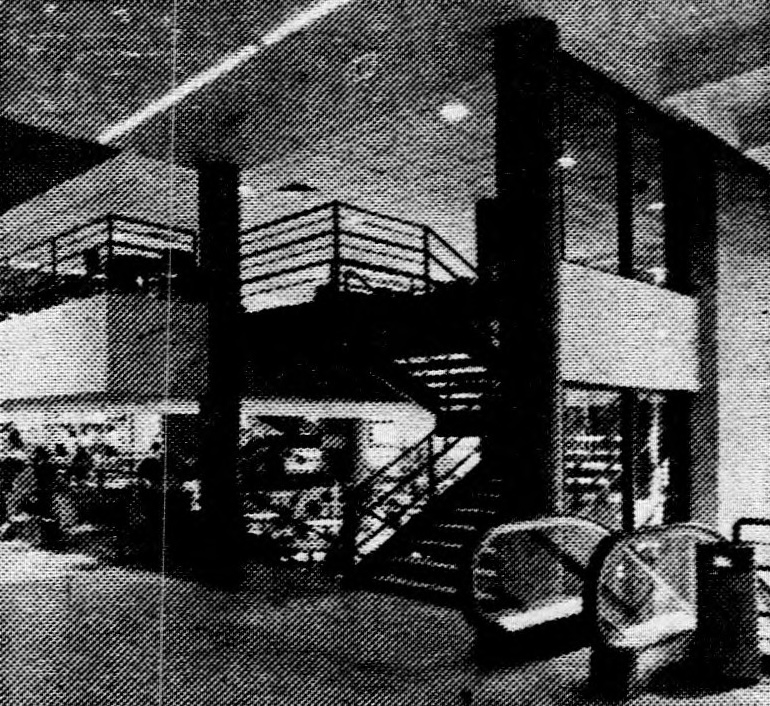
“El Comedor” food court in 1985

In January 1987, Bankers Finance Mortgage Corp., granted $11 million to finance the construction of a new expansion for the mall. Chase Manhattan Bank and City Federal provided the interim loan for the construction of the expansion. The permanent loan was granted by City Federal and the Caguas Central Federal Bank.

In February 1987, expansion plans for the mall were announced, they were programmed for September of that year. It consisted of a 123,000 square foot expansion, it would allow the opening of 40 additional stores and a department store of approximately 27,000 square feet. Once the expansion would be finished, the mall would have two large main entrances; one on Paseo De Diego and the other on Brumbaugh Street. This would facilitate the entry and exit of customers to the mall, in addition to providing easy circulation with a clear display of all the stores established in it. About 84 percent of the leasable area had already been leased. The spaces that remained available would be rented for shops as well as offices. Among the tenants who had already signed a contract by this point were Salvador Colom, Goody's Department Stores, Radio Shack, Rave, Bakers, Flagg's, Gastón Bared, Mediavilla Travel, European Connection, Banco Nacional, Gretjeleen, lluminación and Taco Bell. Goody's, the department store, which would serve as an anchor to the mall, would have different specialized sections, the main ones being women's clothing, men's clothing, perfumery, gifts and cards, women's shoes, men's and children's shoes, among others. The total cost of the project would be around $14.5 million with financing of $10.6 million, provided by Chase, City Federal Savings Bank, and Caguas Central Federal Savings. The style of the new structure would be a vertical, four-story mall, which combined traditional design elements with contemporary ones. With the new expansion, a valet parking with direct access to the mall would be provided, in this way it was expected to penetrate the primary market since parking was extremely essential in the Río Piedras area.

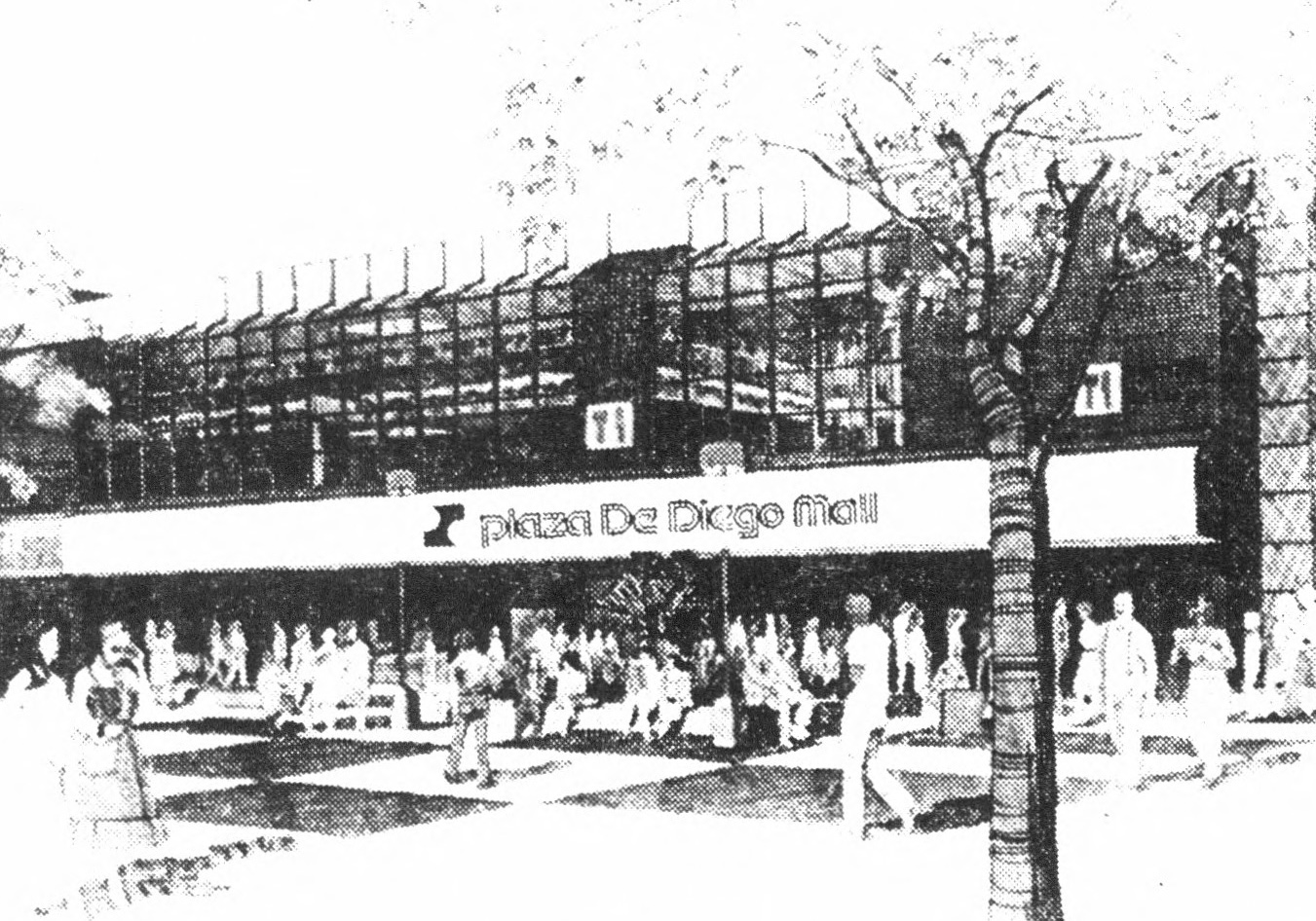
Illustration from 1987 of how the mall would look after expanding

In May 1987, the part of the expansion, which faces Brumbaugh Street, where there would also be another main entrance, was almost complete. By the end of June of that year, the premises that would be located in this area would begin to be delivered, so that the new tenants could start working on their stores. Through the main entrance on Brumbaugh Street, you would be able to immediately reach the atrium that would have natural light through "sky light", allowing the reflections of light to spread through all the surrounding corridors of the mall. The elevator would be located in this area panoramic, which would give access to all levels of the mall. The expansion in this area would have four levels, three for shops and the "Office Mall Level", where professional and government offices would be included. All the clients that regularly visited these offices would also be able to enjoy all the facilities offered by the mall.

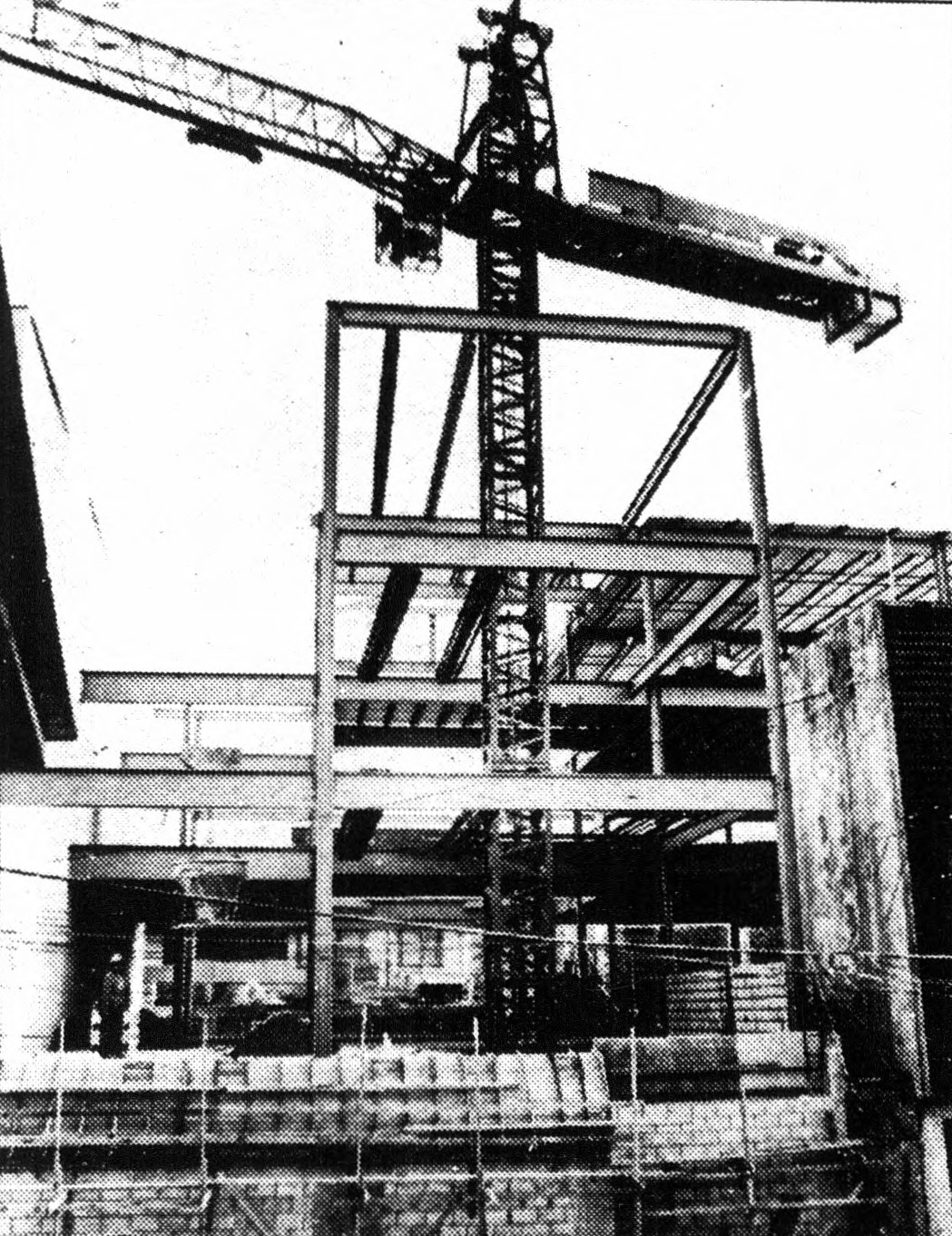
Where the elevator would be located at during construction in 1987

In April 1989, the mall housed 40 stores, with a wide variety and a department store, Goody's Department Store. Here the consumer would be able to find clothing for young people and ladies: such as Rave, Marianne Express and Luber; unisex clothing at Peaje y Viceversa; children's clothing in Bambilandia; shoes: Almacenes Rodríguez, Bakers, Trazo shoes and Flash Shoes; Flagg Shoes, for sports and casual shoes; Revelations, for shoes with special widths in sizes; for brides, Celebration; La Fiesta, with a wide variety of cards and gifts; Precious, with the widest range of cosmetics and beauty products; Smug, with exclusive lines of fantasy jewelry; Impostors, if what you were looking for were some imitation of a famous jewel; The gold house and Yafrán, with fine jewelry; Le Jardin, with plants and products for the garden; and services such as the K-Chez Beauty Salon; the Mediavilla Ticket Agency; the National Bank; and Film Photo; Sun Glass Place, with a wide variety of glasses for all tastes and budgets; and Sports Salvador Colom. In addition, the Viva electrical goods store, Buonalux Lamps and Radio Shack. In its food court El Comedor, it had restaurants for all palates, including: Burger King, Church's, Mandarine, Swensen's, Taco Bell, Star Pizza and Sweetheart.

=== Decline: 1989-1990s ===
In July 1989, debtor then in possession of the Plaza de Diego Shopping Center, Inc., were in court for their negligence towards the mall, which was quite evident in that the shopping mall's physical and economic condition had become ungovernable: the record was rife with all manner of complaints, including scurrying rodents infesting parts of the mall, roof leaks, inoperable escalators, lack of cleanliness, lack of promotion and/or advertising, lack of adequate insurance, and the closing of access to Brumbaugh Street, the primary means of entrance and egress used by the mall's customers. The physical condition of the mall had deteriorated to such an extent that some of its tenants apparently felt justified in not paying their rent. As a result, debtor filed eviction proceedings against some of these tenants. Thus drained of its lifeblood, the mall's condition continued to worsen even after these events, and the vicious cycle which had led to the current state of atrophy and disarray was repeated once again.

In March 1990, The Federal Court of Appeals for the first circuit of Boston had confirmed the day before that the dismissal of a lawsuit for $153 million filed by the owners of by then ill-fated Plaza de Diego Mall against José E. Alegría, Banco Nacional, Chase Manhattan Bank and other entities that financed the project. The unanimous decision of the Boston-based appellate court confirmed the ruling issued on May 25, 1989, by federal judge José A. Fusté, who dismissed all the plaintiffs' claims for disobedience, issuing court orders, filing late motions, and sometimes failing to follow through on crucial aspects of the proceedings. The appellate forum said that the "improper conduct of the plaintiffs", represented by the lawyer Edelmiro Salas García, reached the extreme that judge Fusté's severe action was justified, who used his discretion to impose the most forceful remedy possible and dismiss the case with prejudice, thus preventing the federal claim from being filed again. However, the appellate court instructed Judge Fusté to declare himself without jurisdiction in several of the claims of the plaintiffs who present issues, of state law and could be raised in the courts of Puerto Rico. The lawsuit was filed in March 1989 by the president of Plaza De Diego, Francisco Rivera Brenes, and Rafael Figueroa Ruiz, another shareholder of the mall. They alleged that the defendants, the City Federal Savings Bank and the Bankers Finance Mortgage Company, conspired to defraud them in the course of transactions that were made to structure the financing of an expansion of the shopping mall. In November 1990, the situation at the mall was so bad that the trustee and administrator of the mall, Pedro Fusté, argued that “around 30% of the businesses had disappeared in the last 24 months." In fact, Plaza de Diego Mall was operating under Chapter 11 of the Bankruptcy Law at the time. The state of the mall was also part in due to the state of Río Piedras and the Paseo de Diego during this period of time.

=== Failed revitalization: 2000s ===
In January 2006, under Sun Realty Corp., the by then 140,000 square foot Plaza de Diego Mall was being renamed to the “Río Piedras Profesional Mall” attempting to become a mixed-use center. Advertising for commercial, professional offices, and food court spaces were undergoing. These plans for renaming were never fully implemented.

=== Closure and redevelopment: 2010s, and on ===
In May 2014, an evaluation of the structural condition of the mall was done by Brea Structural. By this point the former mall building had been in disuse for a few years, the structure of 4 levels was of reinforced concrete and structural steel. Non-destructive tests were conducted to estimate the location of the reinforcing steel. In June 2019, plans for redevelopment of the former Plaza de Diego Mall building would begin, as a new concept named “De Diego Village” would be underway.

In July 2020, Puerto Rico and federal government officials would unveil plans for the De Diego Village, a $34 million affordable and multifamily housing complex to be located in the Río Piedras urban center that would include a commercial area to promote the revitalization of the once active area of San Juan. With a construction area of 4,898,728 meters, De Diego Village would comprise 94 new apartment units of one, two or three bedrooms, distributed in two 10-story buildings. Of that total, 22 units would be designated as accessible for mobility and two units with sensory accessibility. By November 2020, demolition of the former Plaza de Diego Mall building would begin.

On December 13, 2023, the governor of Puerto Rico, Pedro R. Pierluisi, the secretary of the Department of Housing, William Rodríguez Rodríguez, and the mayor of San Juan, Miguel Romero, would officially inaugurate De Diego Village, the multifamily housing project now located where the former Plaza de Diego Mall once stood.
