= Puerto Rico Highway 189 =

Highway in Puerto Rico

Highway 189
- Ruta 189

Route information
- Maintained by Puerto Rico DTPW
- Length: 15.1 km (9.4 mi)

Major junctions
- West end: PR-1 / PR-33 in Caguas barrio-pueblo
- PR-32 in Caguas barrio-pueblo; PR-30 in Rincón; PR-931 in Rincón; PR-932 in Rincón–Navarro; PR-9944 in Rincón; PR-943 in Gurabo barrio-pueblo; PR-181 in Mamey; PR-185 in Mamey; PR-30 / PR-9919 in Juncos barrio-pueblo; PR-933 in Juncos barrio-pueblo
- East end: PR-30 / PR-31 in Ceiba Norte

Location
- Country: United States
- Territory: Puerto Rico
- Municipalities: Caguas, Gurabo, Juncos

Highway system
- Roads in Puerto Rico; List
← PR-188	→ PR-190
← PR-9188	PR-9189	→ PR-1

Puerto Rico Highway 189 (PR-189) is a 15 kilometres (9 mi) long main highway which parallels very closely the first half of Puerto Rico Highway 30 from Caguas, Puerto Rico near downtown to Juncos, Puerto Rico passing through all three business centers of Caguas, Gurabo and Juncos. It ends at Puerto Rico Highway 31, and has no direct intersection with Puerto Rico Highway 198 although they are not separated by more than half a kilometer.

== Major intersections ==
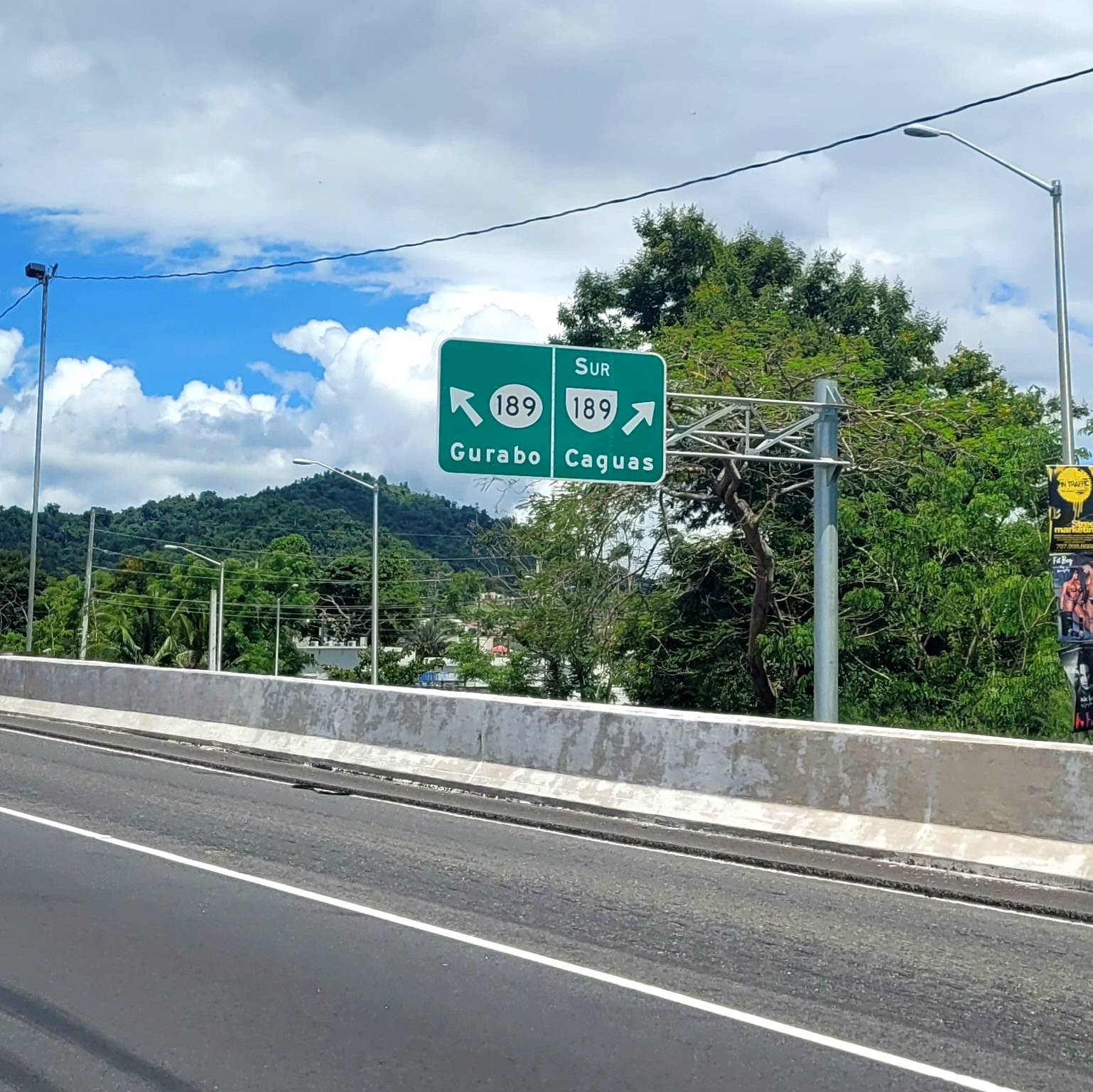
PR-30 east at exit 4 to PR-189 in Rincón, Gurabo

Municipality	Location	km	mi	Destinations	Notes
Caguas	Caguas barrio-pueblo	0.0	0.0	PR-33 west (Avenida José Mercado) – Aguas Buenas	Continuation beyond PR-1
Caguas	Caguas barrio-pueblo	0.0	0.0	PR-1 – Caguas, San Juan, Humacao	Western terminus of PR-189 and counterclockwise terminus of PR-33
Caguas	Caguas barrio-pueblo	0.6– 0.7	0.37– 0.43	To PR-768 / PR-Avenida Rafael Cordero – Caguas, San Juan	
Caguas	Caguas barrio-pueblo	1.1	0.68	PR-768 (Calle Héctor R. Bunker) – Caguas	
Caguas	Caguas barrio-pueblo	1.8	1.1	PR-32 (Avenida Luis Muñoz Marín) – Caguas	
Gurabo	Rincón	3.6	2.2	PR-30 (Expreso Cruz Ortiz Stella) – San Juan, Humacao	PR-30 exit 4; diverging diamond interchange
Gurabo	Rincón	3.9– 4.0	2.4– 2.5	PR-9189 – Rincón	
Gurabo	Rincón–Navarro line	4.3	2.7	PR-931 – Navarro	
Gurabo	Rincón	6.2	3.9	PR-932 – Rincón	
Gurabo	Rincón	7.2	4.5	PR-9944 (Desvío Oscar Dávila Carrión) to PR-30 (Expreso Cruz Ortiz Stella) – Caguas, Juncos, Jaguas	PR-30 exit 7
Gurabo	Gurabo barrio-pueblo	7.6	4.7	PR-943 (Calle Santiago) – Gurabo	One-way street
Gurabo	Mamey	8.0	5.0	PR-181 (Avenida Arturo López Sanabria) – San Lorenzo, Trujillo Alto	
Gurabo	Mamey	8.9	5.5	PR-9030 to PR-30 (Expreso Cruz Ortiz Stella) – Caguas, Humacao, Mamey	PR-30 exit 9
Gurabo	Mamey	10.3	6.4	PR-933 – Mamey	Former intersection
Juncos	Mamey	13.0	8.1	PR-185 to PR-30 west (Expreso Cruz Ortiz Stella) – Canóvanas, Caguas	PR-30 exit 12
Juncos	Mamey	13.6	8.5	PR-952 – Mamey	
Juncos	Juncos barrio-pueblo	13.7	8.5	PR-30 (Expreso Cruz Ortiz Stella) / PR-9919 (Desvío Ingeniero Josué Díaz Díaz) – Caguas, Humacao, Lirios	PR-30 exit 13; diamond interchange
Juncos	Juncos barrio-pueblo	14.5	9.0	PR-933 (Calle Algarín) – Juncos	One-way street
Juncos	Juncos barrio-pueblo	14.6– 14.7	9.1– 9.1	PR-9913 (Avenida Las Flores) – Juncos	
Juncos	Ceiba Norte–Ceiba Sur line	15.0	9.3	PR-9934 – Ceiba Sur	
Juncos	Ceiba Norte	15.1	9.4	PR-30 (Expreso Cruz Ortiz Stella) – Caguas, Humacao	Eastern terminus of PR-189 and western terminus of PR-31; PR-30 exit 14; diamond interchange
Juncos	Ceiba Norte	15.1	9.4	PR-31 east – Naguabo	Continuation beyond PR-30
1.000 mi = 1.609 km; 1.000 km = 0.621 mi: Closed/former

== Related route ==
Highway 9189
- Location: Gurabo
- Length: 1.4 km (0.87 mi)

Puerto Rico Highway 9189 (PR-9189) is a spur route located in Gurabo. It branches off from PR-189 and provides access to several neighborhoods in Rincón. The entire route is located in Rincón, Gurabo.

km	mi	Destinations	Notes
0.0	0.0	PR-189 – Gurabo, Caguas	Southern terminus of PR-9189
1.4	0.87	Northern terminus of PR-9189 at Sector Preciosa; dead end road	
1.000 mi = 1.609 km; 1.000 km = 0.621 mi
