= Valenciano =

Valenciano (Spanish, Italian, Galician, and Portuguese for Valencian; Valencian: valencià; meaning natural from Valencia City, the Valencia Province or Valencia Autonomous Community), may refer to:

- Valencian language (Valencian: valencià, Spanish: valenciano, full term in Valencian: llengua valenciana), the native language of the Valencian Community (a.k.a. Valencian Country), Spain
- Valencian people or Valencians (Valencian: valencians, Spanish: valencianos; full term in Valencian: poble valencià, in Spanish: pueblo valenciano), natural of the Valencian Community, an ethnic group and nationality within Spain. Also a natural of the city of Valencia and the province of Valencia, both within the Valencian Community

Further related terms:

- Valenciano (surname)
- Valenciano River, a river in Puerto Rico
- Perro ratonero valenciano (Gos rater valencià) or Valencian Terrier, a Valencian dog breed

== See also ==
- Valencià (disambiguation)
- Valencian (disambiguation)
- Valenciana (disambiguation)
- Valenciennes
