= Puerto Rico Highway 183 =

Highway in Puerto Rico

Coordinates: 18°11′1.5″N 65°56′59.2″W

Highway 183
- Ruta 183

Route information
- Maintained by Puerto Rico DTPW
- Length: 22.4 km (13.9 mi)
- Existed: 1953–present

Major junctions
- West end: PR-1 in Caguas barrio-pueblo
- PR-33 in Caguas barrio-pueblo; PR-32 in Caguas barrio-pueblo; PR-34 in Tomás de Castro; PR-203 / PR-9931 in Hato; PR-181 in Hato–Quemados; PR-928 in Florida; PR-919 in Valenciano Abajo–Valenciano Arriba; PR-204 in Montones; PR-917 in Montones–Tejas; PR-30 in Tejas–Montones
- East end: PR-198 in Las Piedras barrio-pueblo

Location
- Country: United States
- Territory: Puerto Rico
- Municipalities: Caguas, San Lorenzo, Juncos, Las Piedras

Highway system
- Roads in Puerto Rico; List
| ← PR-182 | → PR-184 |

Puerto Rico Highway 183 (PR-183) is a main highway which begins in the downtown/business area of Caguas, near Puerto Rico Highway 1 and ends in Puerto Rico Highway 198 in Las Piedras. Measuring near 25 kilometers, it is real rural parallel road of Puerto Rico Highway 30, though it goes significantly south of the latter (through San Lorenzo) and the only municipality it does not go through which PR-30 does in Humacao.

== Route description ==
PR-183 can be accessed by two connectors from PR-30; PR-203 from Gurabo to San Lorenzo, and PR-204 (future) in Las Piedras, and they make their only direct intersection in Las Piedras (Exit 21). It is two-lane per direction in Caguas and becomes rural in the municipality just before entering San Lorenzo, and after its confusing intersection with PR-203 it becomes a small two-lane per direction again for about 4 kilometers, and then becomes rural for the rest of its length.

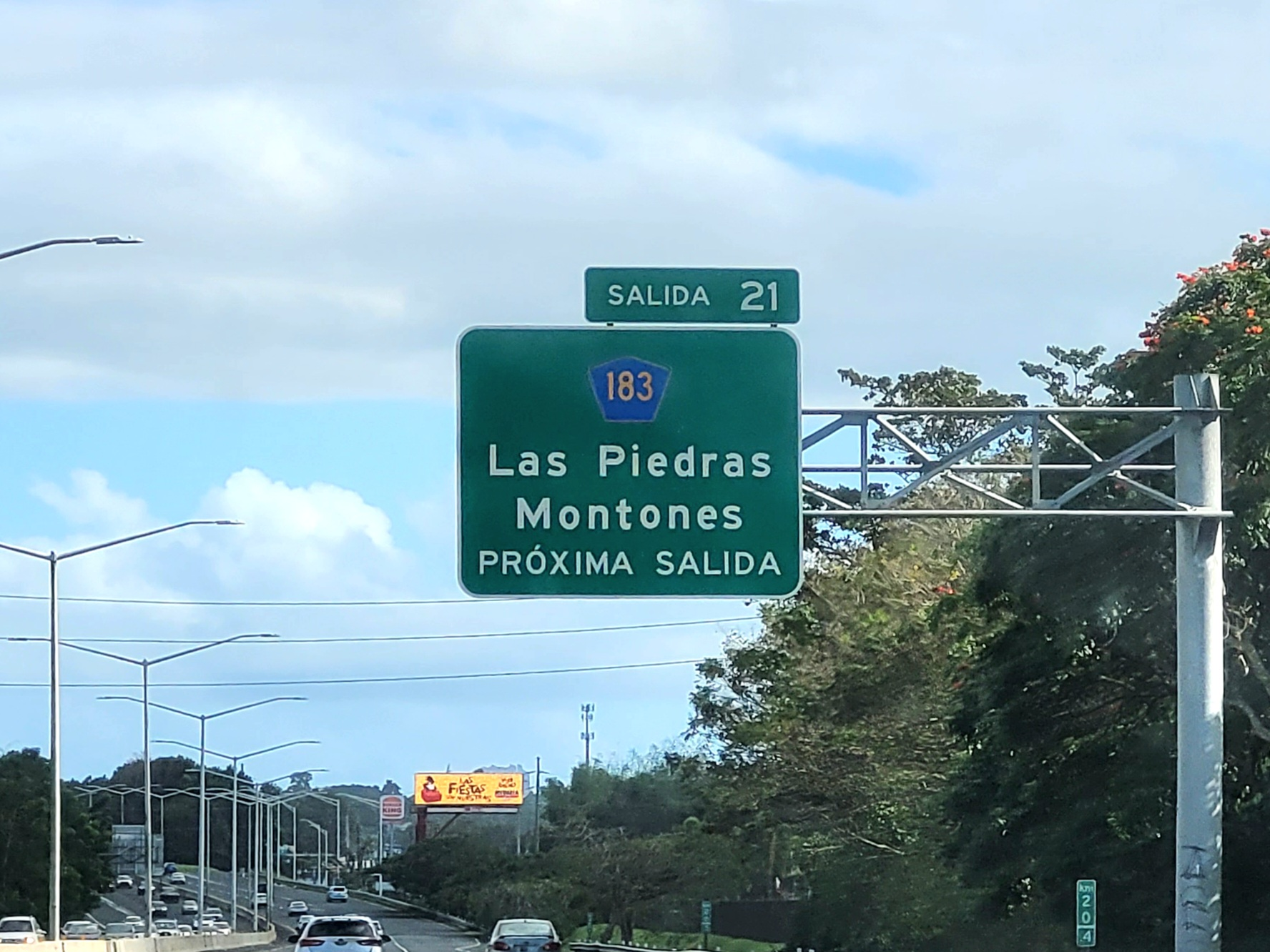
PR-30 east approaching exit 21 to PR-183 in Montones, Las Piedras

== Major intersections ==
| Municipality | Location | km | mi | Destinations | Notes |
|---|---|---|---|---|---|
| Caguas | Caguas barrio-pueblo | 0.0 | 0.0 | PR-1 south (Calle Luis Muñoz Rivera) – Cayey | Western terminus of PR-183; one-way street |
| Caguas | Caguas barrio-pueblo | 0.2 | 0.12 | PR-1P south (Avenida José Gautier Benítez) – Cayey | |
| Caguas | Caguas barrio-pueblo | 0.4– 0.5 | 0.25– 0.31 | PR-33 north (Calle Eugenio María de Hostos) / PR-Avenida Rafael Cordero – Caguas | |
| Caguas | Caguas barrio-pueblo | 1.1– 1.2 | 0.68– 0.75 | PR-32 (Avenida Luis Muñoz Marín) – San Juan, Cayey | |
| Caguas | Tomás de Castro | 1.5 | 0.93 | PR-788 – Tomás de Castro | |
| Caguas | Tomás de Castro | 1.7 | 1.1 | PR-789 – Tomás de Castro | Seagull intersection |
| Caguas | Tomás de Castro | 2.2 | 1.4 | PR-34 west (Extensión Avenida Federico Degetau) – Caguas | Seagull intersection |
| San Lorenzo | Hato | 8.5– 8.6 | 5.3– 5.3 | PR-203 north (Expreso Chayanne) / PR-9931 – San Lorenzo, Gurabo | Partial cloverleaf interchange |
| San Lorenzo | Hato–Quemados line | 10.3 | 6.4 | PR-181 south – Patillas | Western terminus of PR-181 concurrency |
| San Lorenzo | Hato–Quemados line | 10.6 | 6.6 | PR-181 (Calle Luis Muñoz Rivera) – San Lorenzo | Eastern terminus of PR-181 concurrency |
| San Lorenzo | Cerro Gordo | 11.4 | 7.1 | PR-916 – Cerro Gordo | |
| San Lorenzo | Florida | 12.1– 12.2 | 7.5– 7.6 | PR-980 – San Lorenzo | |
| San Lorenzo | Florida | 13.6– 13.7 | 8.5– 8.5 | PR-928 – Juncos | |
| Juncos | Valenciano Abajo–Valenciano Arriba line | 16.8 | 10.4 | PR-919 – Valenciano Arriba | Western terminus of PR-919 concurrency |
| Juncos | Valenciano Abajo–Valenciano Arriba line | 17.0 | 10.6 | PR-919 – Valenciano Abajo | Eastern terminus of PR-919 concurrency |
| Las Piedras | Ceiba–Montones line | 17.9 | 11.1 | PR-917 – Montones | |
| Las Piedras | Montones | 19.6 | 12.2 | PR-204 north (Carretera Guillermo Pedraza Algarín) – Las Piedras | |
| Las Piedras | Montones–Tejas line | 21.0 | 13.0 | PR-917 – Montones | Roundabout |
| Las Piedras | Montones–Tejas line | 21.2 | 13.2 | PR-30 (Expreso Cruz Ortiz Stella) – Caguas, Humacao | PR-30 exit 21; diamond interchange |
| Las Piedras | Montones–Tejas line | 21.4 | 13.3 | PR-9939 (Desvío Francisco Maldonado) – Las Piedras | |
| Las Piedras | Montones–Tejas line | 22.0 | 13.7 | PR-9922 (Avenida Aníbal García Peña) – Las Piedras | |
| Las Piedras | Las Piedras barrio-pueblo | 22.4 | 13.9 | PR-198 (Calle José Celso Barbosa) – Juncos, Humacao | Eastern terminus of PR-183 |
1.000 mi = 1.609 km; 1.000 km = 0.621 mi: Concurrency terminus

== See also ==
- 1953 Puerto Rico highway renumbering
