= Puerto Rico Highway 32 =

Highway in Puerto Rico

Highway 32
- Ruta 32
- Avenida Luis Muñoz Marín

Route information
- Maintained by Puerto Rico DTPW
- Length: 7.2 km (4.5 mi)

Major junctions
- South end: PR-172 in Cañaboncito–Turabo
- PR-1 in Turabo; PR-34 in Turabo; PR-183 in Caguas barrio-pueblo; PR-189 in Caguas barrio-pueblo; Avenida Rafael Cordero in Bairoa
- North end: PR-1 in Caguas barrio-pueblo

Location
- Country: United States
- Territory: Puerto Rico
- Municipalities: Caguas

Highway system
- Roads in Puerto Rico; List
← PR-31	→ PR-33

Puerto Rico Highway 32 (PR-32) is an urban road in Caguas, Puerto Rico. This road goes from PR-1 in Bairoa to PR-172 in Turabo, east of downtown, and it is known as Avenida Luis Muñoz Marín.

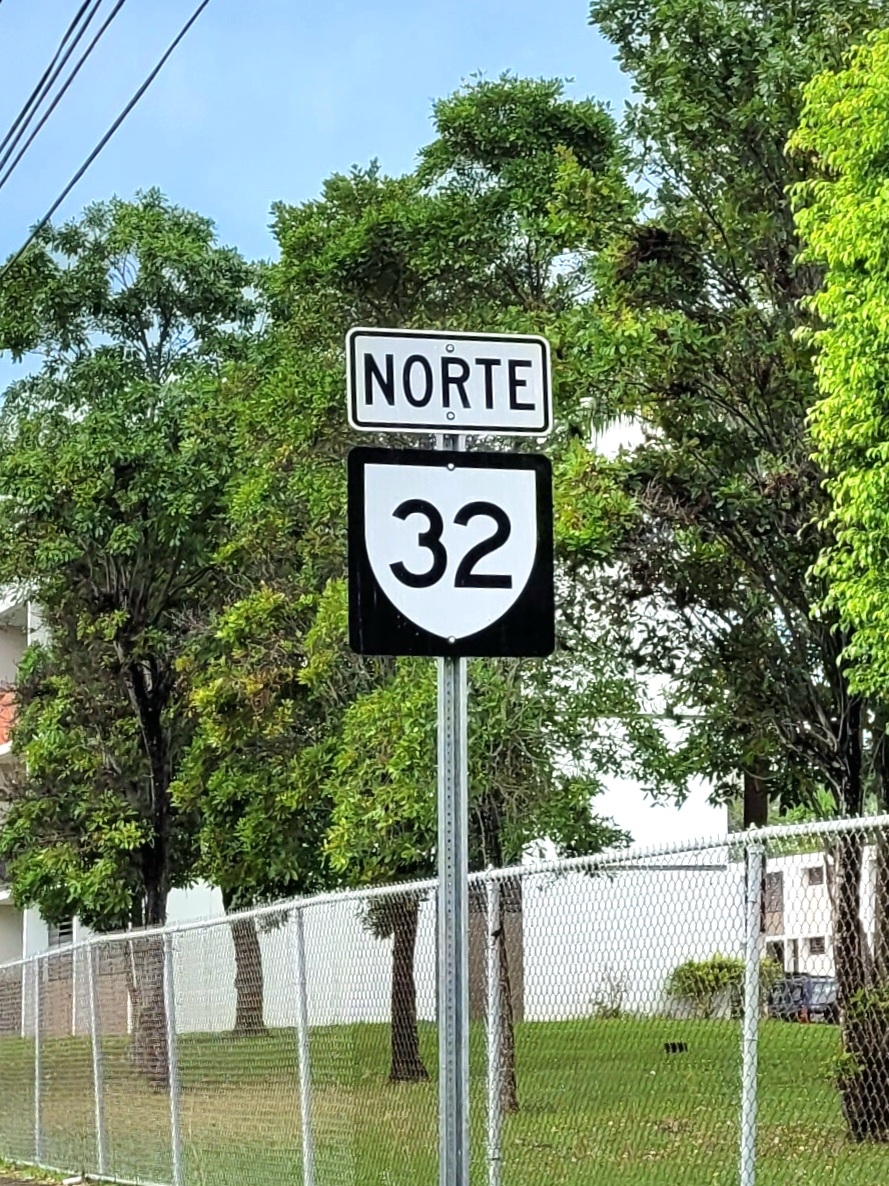
Northbound sign for PR-32

== Major intersections ==
The entire route is located in Caguas.

Location	km	mi	Destinations	Notes
Cañaboncito–Turabo line	0.0	0.0	PR-172 (Avenida Pino) to PR-52 (Autopista Luis A. Ferré) – Cidra, San Juan, Ponce	Southern terminus of PR-32
Turabo	0.3	0.19	PR-1 (Avenida José Gautier Benítez) – Caguas, Cayey	
Turabo	1.5	0.93	PR-Calle San Carlos – Caguas	
Turabo	2.1	1.3	PR-34 (Avenida Extensión Federico Degetau) – Caguas	
Caguas barrio-pueblo	2.6	1.6	PR-Bulevar Cristóbal Colón – Caguas	
Caguas barrio-pueblo	2.9	1.8	PR-183 – Caguas, San Lorenzo	
Caguas barrio-pueblo	3.3	2.1	PR-Calle San Andrés – Caguas	
Tomás de Castro	4.0	2.5	PR-Calle Doctor Pedro Gerónimo Goyco – Caguas	
Caguas barrio-pueblo	4.9	3.0	PR-189 – Caguas, Gurabo, Humacao	
Bairoa	5.5	3.4	To PR-30 (Expreso Cruz Ortiz Stella) / PR-Avenida Rafael Cordero – Caguas, Gurabo, Humacao	
Bairoa	6.4	4.0	PR-Avenida José Garrido – Caguas	
Caguas barrio-pueblo	7.2	4.5	PR-1 to PR-30 (Expreso Cruz Ortiz Stella) / PR-52 (Autopista Luis A. Ferré) – Caguas, San Juan, Humacao	Northern terminus of PR-32
1.000 mi = 1.609 km; 1.000 km = 0.621 mi

== See also ==
- Luis Muñoz Marín
