= Valencià =

Valencià (Catalan/Valencian for Valencian) may refer to:

- Valencian Country (Valencian: País Valencià), more commonly known as Valencian Community, an autonomous community in Spain
  - Valencian language (llengua valenciana, or simply valencià), the native language of the Valencian Community, Spain
  - Valencian people (poble valencià; or valencians, s. valencià); natural of the Valencian Community, an ethnic group and nationality within Spain. Also a natural of the city of Valencia and the province of Valencia, both within the Valencian Community

== See also ==
- Valencian (disambiguation)
- Valenciana (disambiguation)
- Valenciano (disambiguation)
- Valenciennes
