= Juncos barrio-pueblo =

Historical and administrative center (seat) of Juncos, Puerto Rico

Juncos barrio-pueblo Pueblo de Juncos
- Municipality Seat
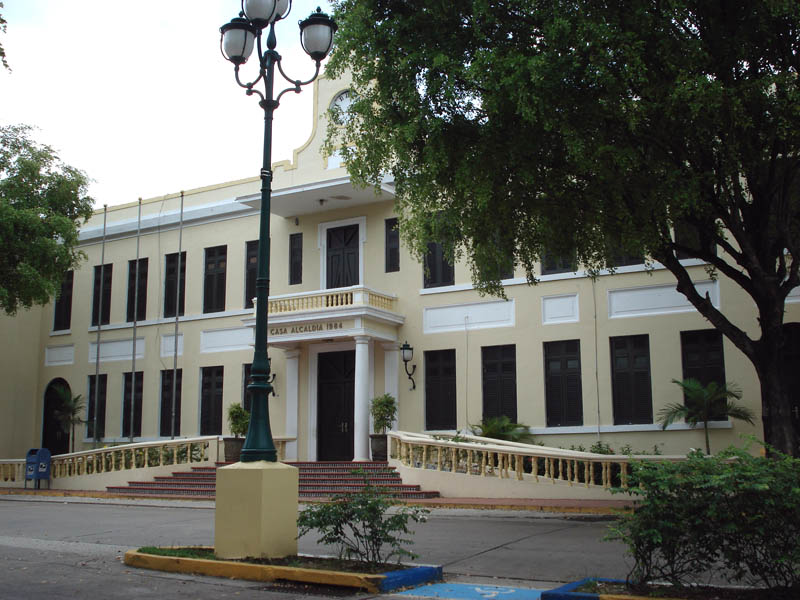
- Town hall of Juncos

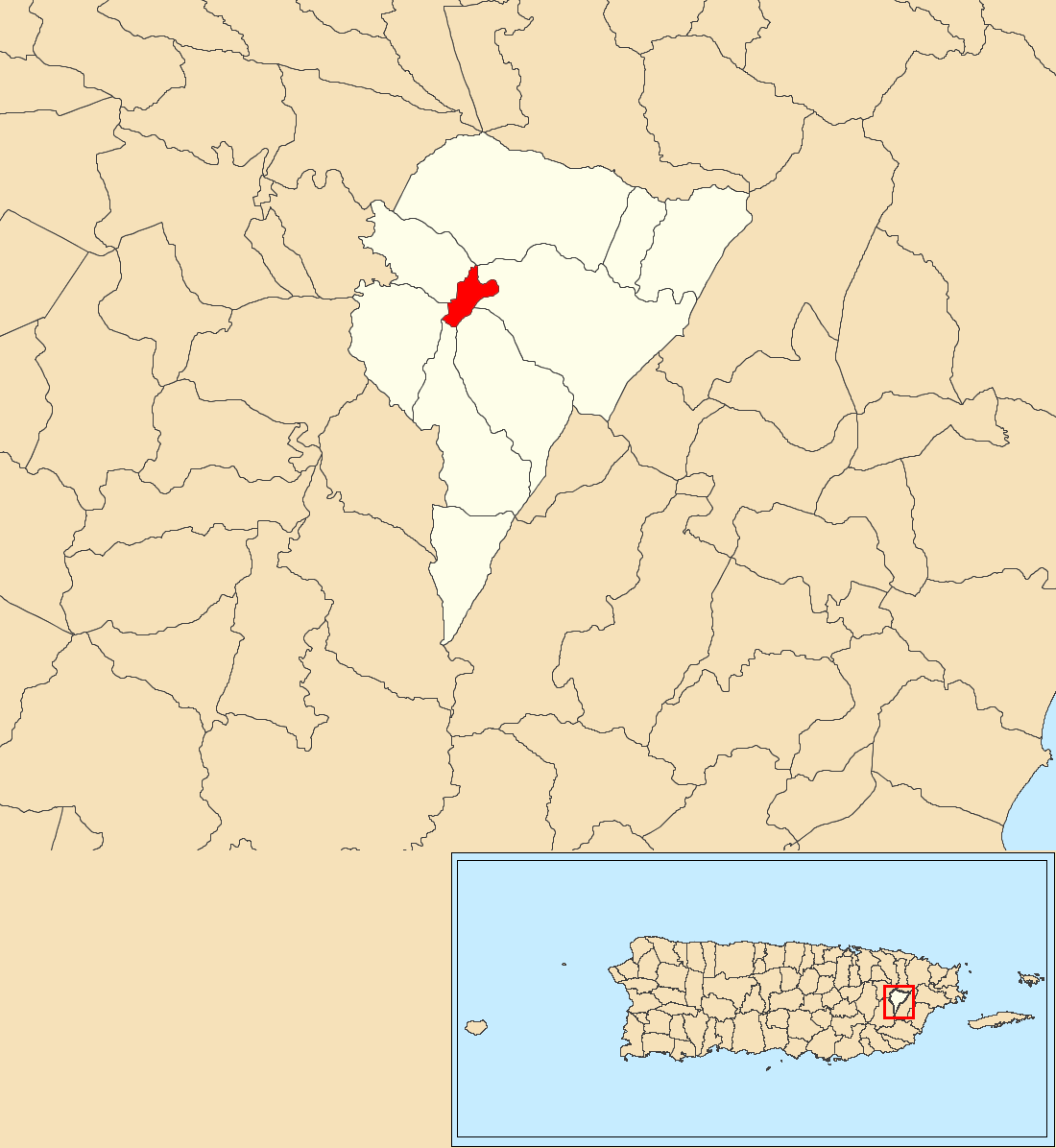
- Location of Juncos barrio-pueblo within the municipality of Juncos shown in red

- Location of Puerto Rico
- Coordinates: 18°13′45″N 65°55′18″W
- Commonwealth: Puerto Rico
- Municipality: Juncos

Area
  - Total: 0.37 sq mi (0.96 km^{2})
  - Land: 0.36 sq mi (0.93 km^{2})
  - Water: 0.01 sq mi (0.026 km^{2})
- Elevation: 236 ft (72 m)

Population (2010)
  - Total: 2,464
  - Density: 6,844.4/sq mi (2,642.6/km^{2})
- Source: 2010 Census
- Time zone: UTC−4 (AST)

Juncos barrio-pueblo is a barrio and the administrative center (seat) of Juncos, a municipality of Puerto Rico. Its population in 2010 was 2,464.

As was customary in Spain, in Puerto Rico, the municipality has a barrio called pueblo which contains a central plaza, the municipal buildings (city hall), and a Catholic church. Fiestas patronales (patron saint festivals) are held in the central plaza every year.

== The central plaza and its church ==
The central plaza, or square, is a place for official and unofficial recreational events and a place where people can gather and socialize from dusk to dawn. The Laws of the Indies, Spanish law, which regulated life in Puerto Rico in the early 19th century, stated the plaza's purpose was for "the parties" (celebrations, festivities) (Spanish: a propósito para las fiestas), and that the square should be proportionally large enough for the number of neighbors (Spanish: grandeza proporcionada al número de vecinos). These Spanish regulations also stated that the streets nearby should be comfortable portals for passersby, protecting them from the elements: sun and rain.

Located across the central plaza in Juncos barrio-pueblo is the Parroquia Inmaculada Concepción (English: Church Inmaculada Concepción of Juncos), a Roman Catholic church.

== History ==
Juncos barrio-pueblo was in Spain's gazetteers until Puerto Rico was ceded by Spain in the aftermath of the Spanish–American War under the terms of the Treaty of Paris of 1898 and became an unincorporated territory of the United States. In 1899, the United States Department of War conducted a census of Puerto Rico finding that the population of Juncos Pueblo was 2,026.

Historical population
Census	Pop.	Note	%±
1900	2,026		—
1910	4,141		104.4%
1920	4,263		2.9%
1930	5,297		24.3%
1940	5,009		−5.4%
1950	8,285		65.4%
1960	6,247		−24.6%
1970	0		−100.0%
1980	3,507		—
1990	3,197		−8.8%
2000	2,637		−17.5%
2010	2,464		−6.6%
U.S. Decennial Census; 1899 (shown as 1900) 1910-1930; 1930-1950 1980-2000 2010

== Gallery ==
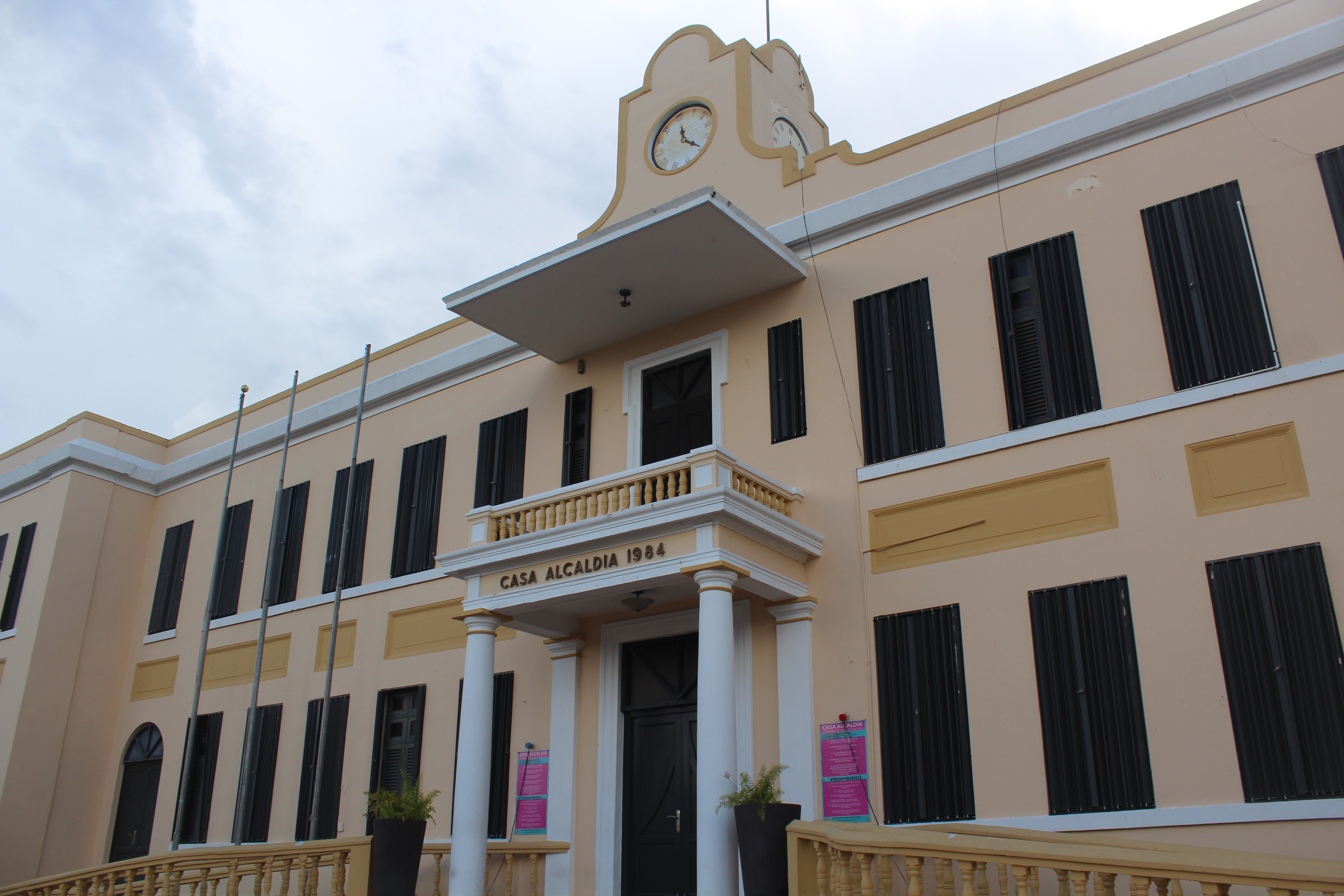
The new Juncos town hall (alcaldía)

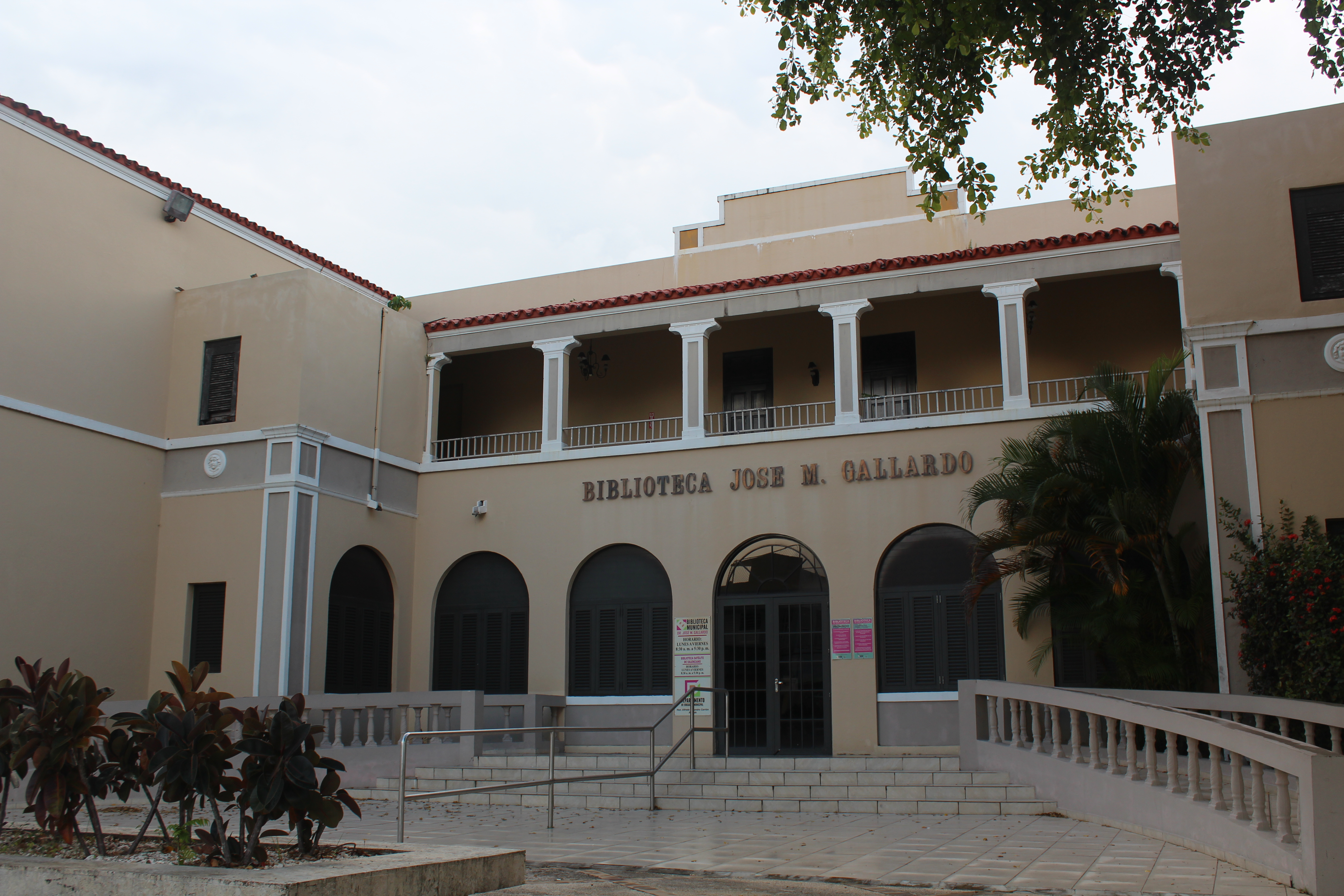
NRHP-listed Juncos Public Library, formerly the José Miguel Gallardo School.

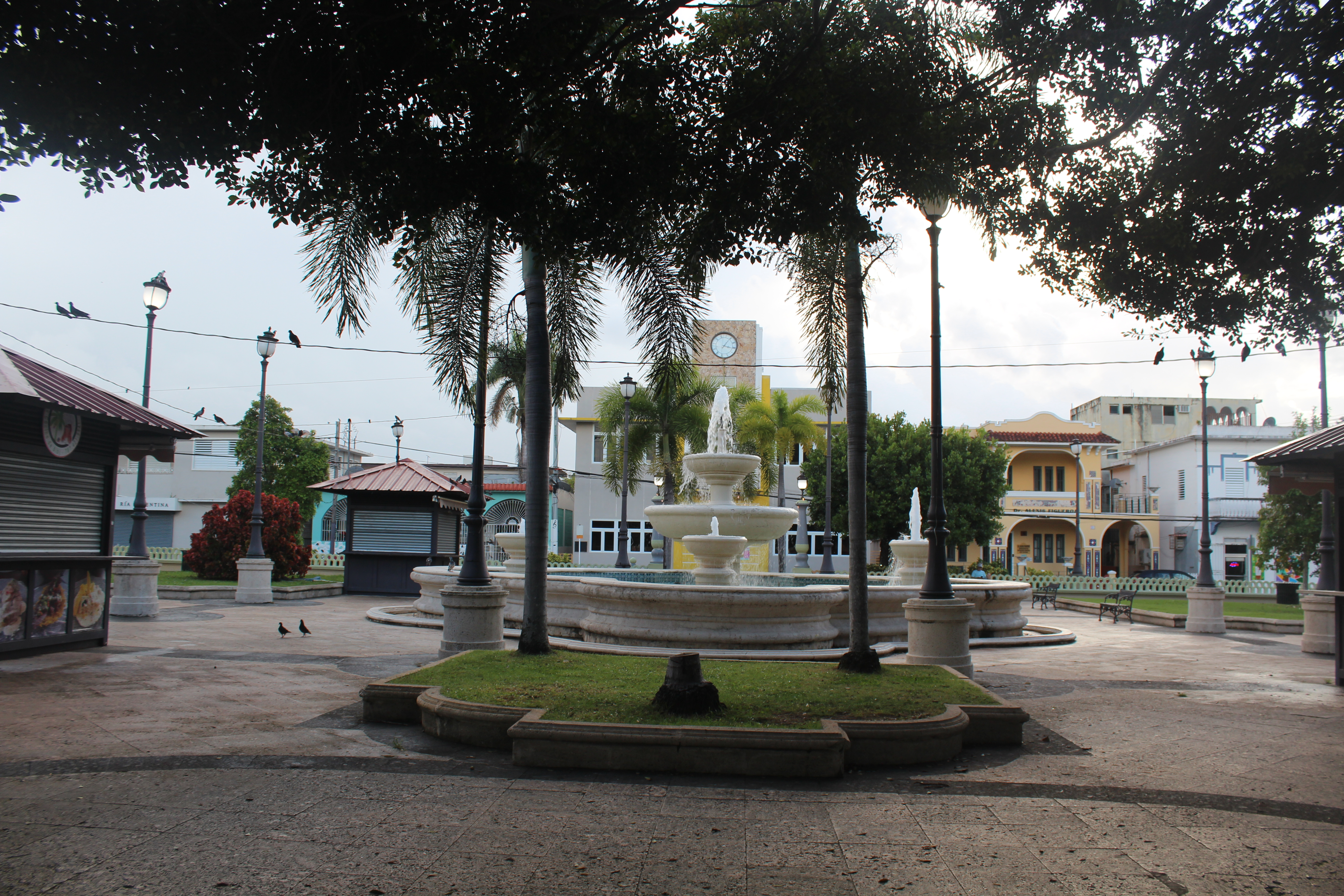
Juncos town square (plaza pública).

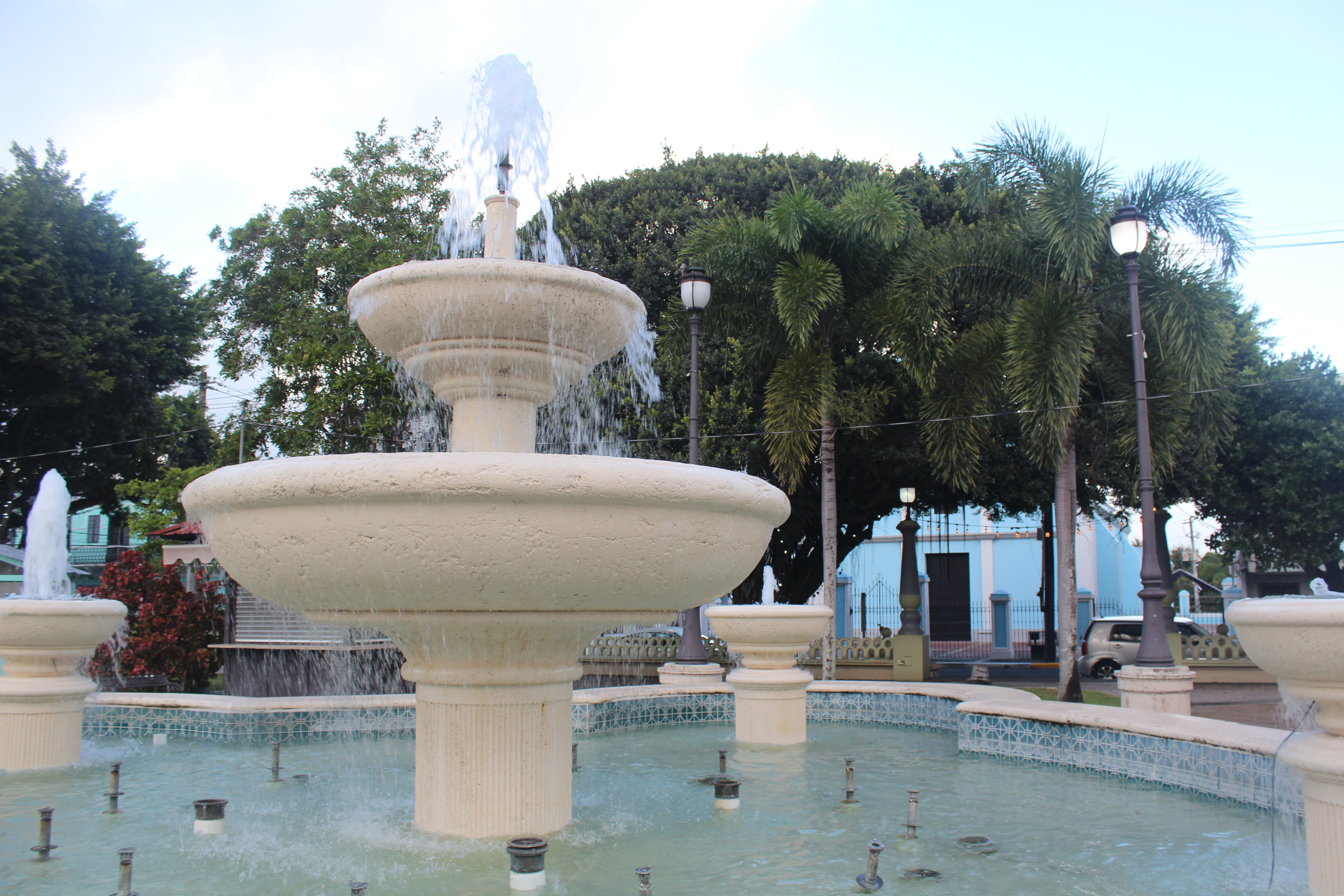
Juncos town square (plaza pública) with the parish church in the background.

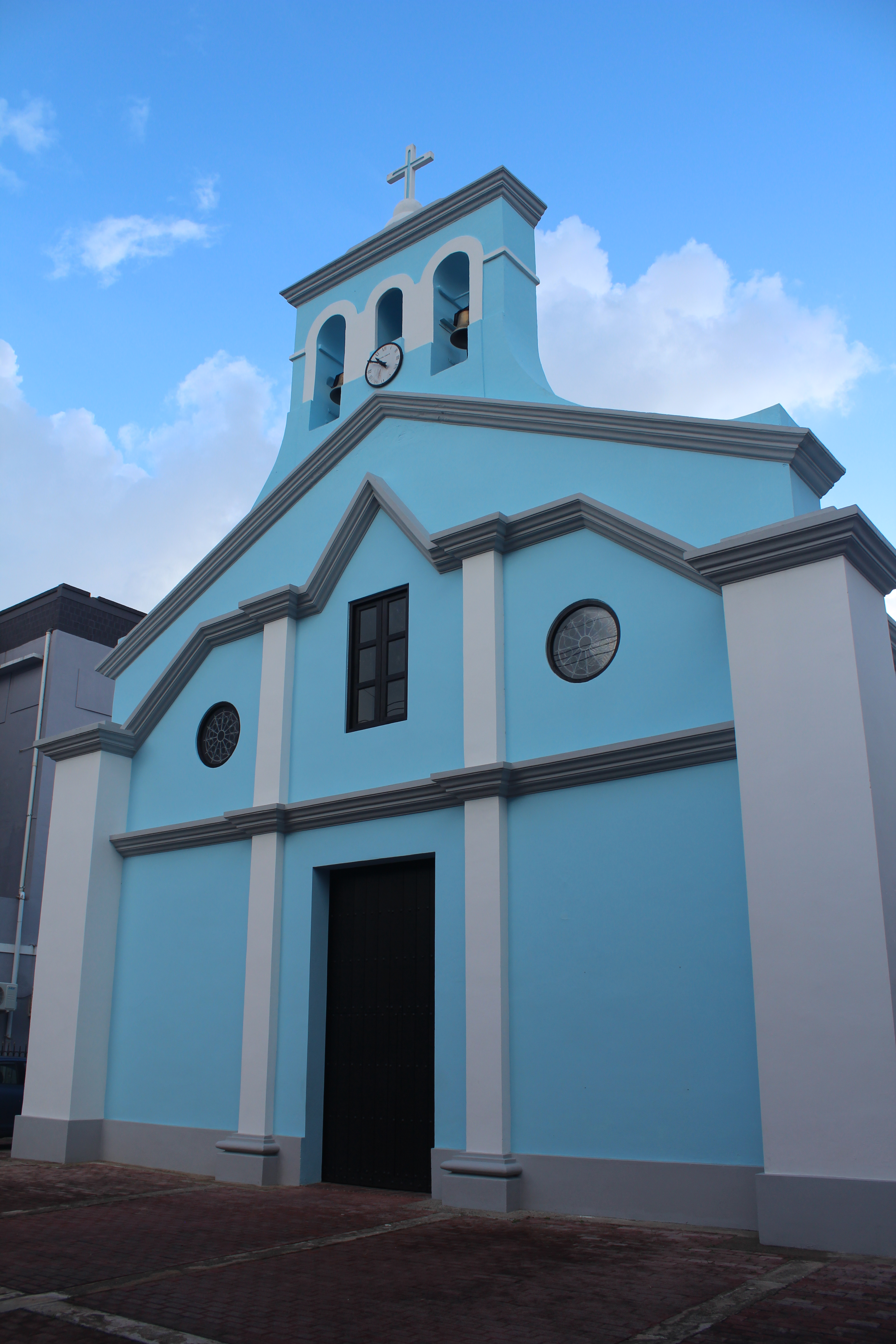
Church Inmaculada Concepción of Juncos

== See also ==
- List of communities in Puerto Rico
