= Valenciana =

Valenciana (feminine of valencià in Catalan/Valencian; and valenciano in Spanish, Italian, Galician, and Portuguese) may refer to:

- Valencian Community (Valencian: Comunitat Valenciana, Spanish: Comunidad Valenciana), a.k.a. Valencian Country, an autonomous community of Spain
  - Valencian language (Valencian: llengua valenciana, or simply valencià), the native language of the Valencian Community (a.k.a. Valencian Country), Spain
  - Valencian people (Valencian: poble valencià; or simply valencians, f. s. valenciana; f. pl. valencianes; m. s. valencià), natural of the Valencian Community, an ethnic group and nationality within Spain. Also a natural of the city of Valencia and the province of Valencia, both within the Valencian Community

Other related terms:

- Arroz a la valenciana (Valencian-style rice), a dish from Latin America and the Philippines (ultimately from the Valencian Community)
- Doña Blanca or Dona Branca, a white Spanish and Portuguese wine grape variety also known as Valenciana

== See also ==
- Valencià
- Valencian
- Valencianisch / Valenzianisch
- Valenciano
- Valencien
- Valencienne
- Valenciennes
- Valenziana
- Valenziano
