= Caimito, Juncos, Puerto Rico =

Barrio of Puerto Rico

Caimito
- Barrio
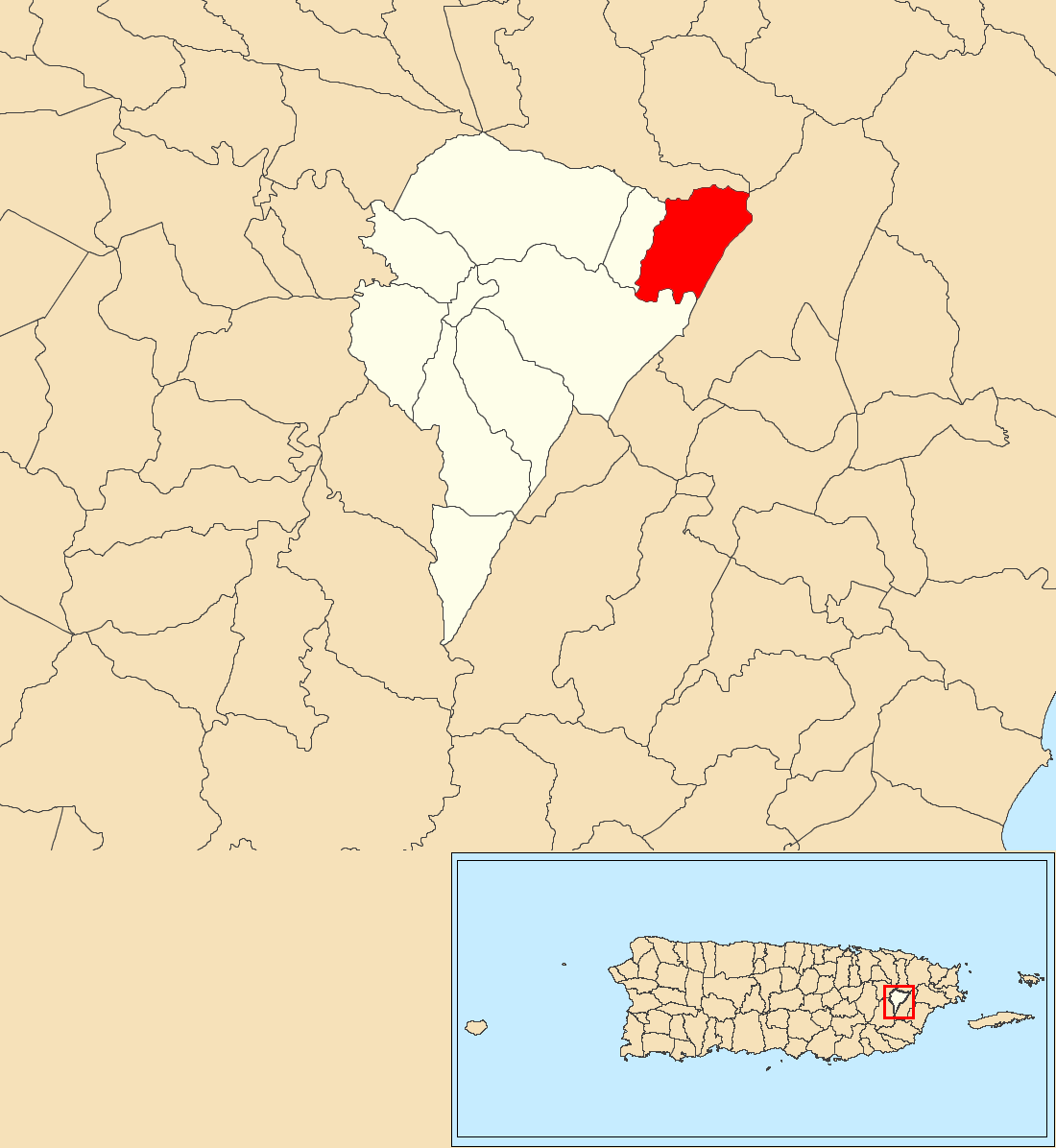
- Location of Caimito within the municipality of Juncos shown in red

- Location of Puerto Rico
- Coordinates: 18°14′34″N 65°52′00″W
- Commonwealth: Puerto Rico
- Municipality: Juncos

Area
  - Total: 2.24 sq mi (5.8 km^{2})
  - Land: 2.24 sq mi (5.8 km^{2})
  - Water: 0 sq mi (0 km^{2})
- Elevation: 699 ft (213 m)

Population (2010)
  - Total: 2,423
  - Density: 1,081.7/sq mi (417.6/km^{2})
- Source: 2010 Census
- Time zone: UTC−4 (AST)

Caimito is a barrio in the municipality of Juncos, Puerto Rico. Its population in 2010 was 2,423.

== History ==
Caimito was in Spain's gazetteers until Puerto Rico was ceded by Spain in the aftermath of the Spanish–American War under the terms of the Treaty of Paris of 1898 and became an unincorporated territory of the United States. In 1899, the United States Department of War conducted a census of Puerto Rico finding that the combined population of Caimito and Gurabo Arriba barrios was 1,295.

Historical population
Census	Pop.	Note	%±
1910	952		—
1920	1,191		25.1%
1930	1,621		36.1%
1940	1,456		−10.2%
1950	1,426		−2.1%
1960	1,839		29.0%
1970	1,868		1.6%
1980	2,168		16.1%
1990	2,224		2.6%
2000	2,658		19.5%
2010	2,423		−8.8%
U.S. Decennial Census; 1900 (N/A) 1910-1930; 1930-1950 1980-2000 2010

== See also ==
- List of communities in Puerto Rico
