= Puerto Rico Highway 33 =

Highway in Puerto Rico

Highway 33
- Ruta 33
- Avenida José Mercado

Route information
- Maintained by Puerto Rico DTPW
- Length: 2.20 km (1.37 mi)

Major junctions
- CW end: PR-183 in Caguas barrio-pueblo
- PR-1 in Caguas barrio-pueblo; PR-156 in Caguas barrio-pueblo
- CCW end: PR-1 / PR-189 in Caguas barrio-pueblo

Location
- Country: United States
- Territory: Puerto Rico
- Municipalities: Caguas

Highway system
- Roads in Puerto Rico; List
← PR-32	→ PR-34

Puerto Rico Highway 33 (PR-33) is an urban road in Caguas, Puerto Rico. This road goes from the junction of PR-1 with PR-189 to Bulevar Cristóbal Colón, west of downtown, and it is known as Avenida José Mercado.

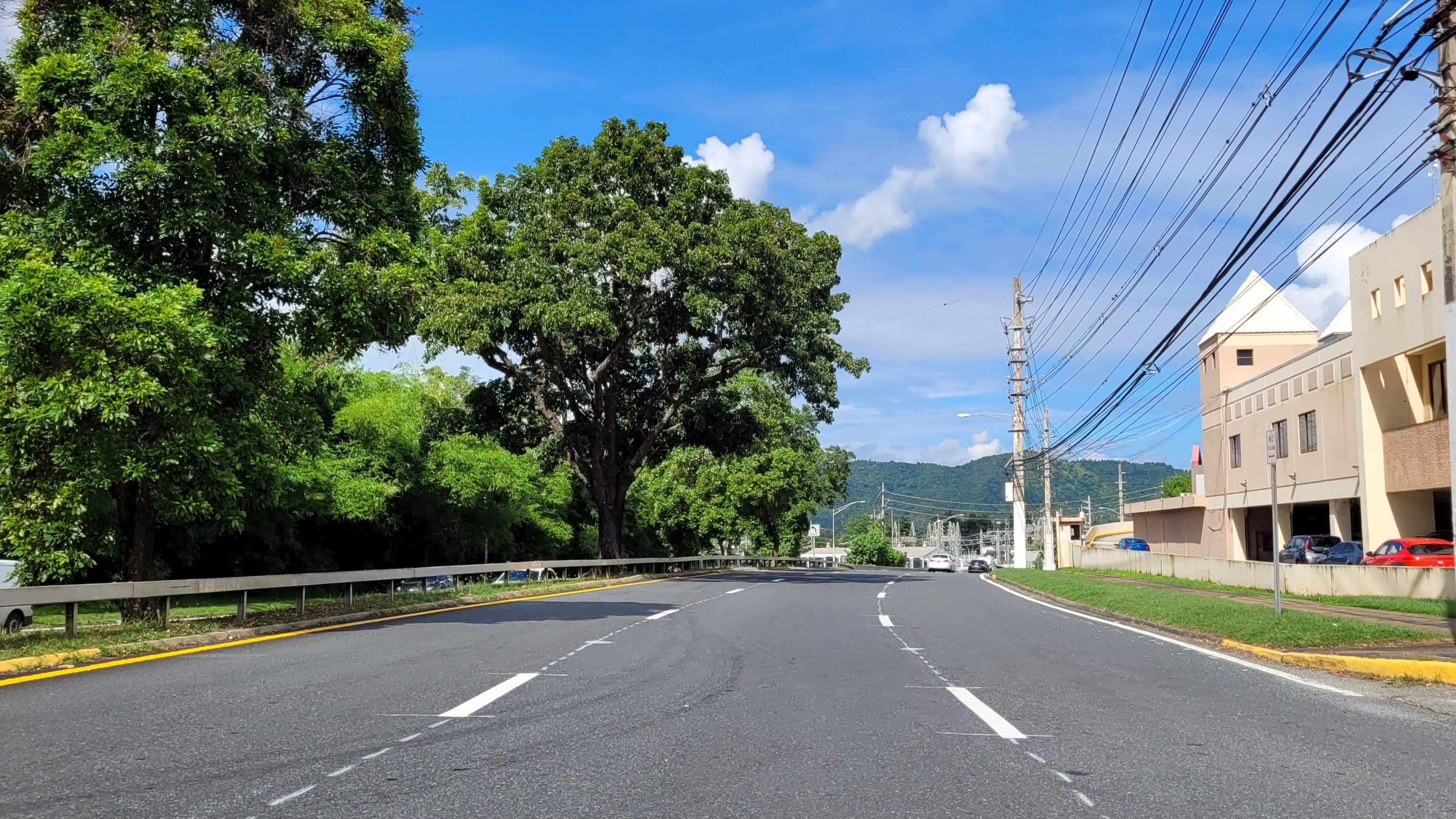
PR-33 heading north

== Major intersections ==
The entire route is located in Caguas barrio-pueblo, Caguas.

km	mi	Destinations	Notes
2.20	1.37	PR-183 east (Calle Eduardo Georgetti) – San Lorenzo	Clockwise terminus of PR-33; one-way street
1.9	1.2	PR-Bulevar Cristóbal Colón – Caguas	
1.6– 1.5	0.99– 0.93	PR-1 (Avenida José Gautier Benítez) – Caguas, Cayey	
1.2	0.75	PR-Bulevar Cristóbal Colón – Caguas	
0.6	0.37	PR-156 (Calle Ramón Emeterio Betances) – Caguas, Aguas Buenas	
0.0	0.0	PR-1 – Caguas, San Juan	Counterclockwise terminus of PR-33 and western terminus of PR-189
0.0	0.0	PR-189 east (Avenida José Villares) – Gurabo, Humacao	Continuation beyond PR-1
1.000 mi = 1.609 km; 1.000 km = 0.621 mi
