= José Miguel Gallardo School =

- U.S. National Register of Historic Places
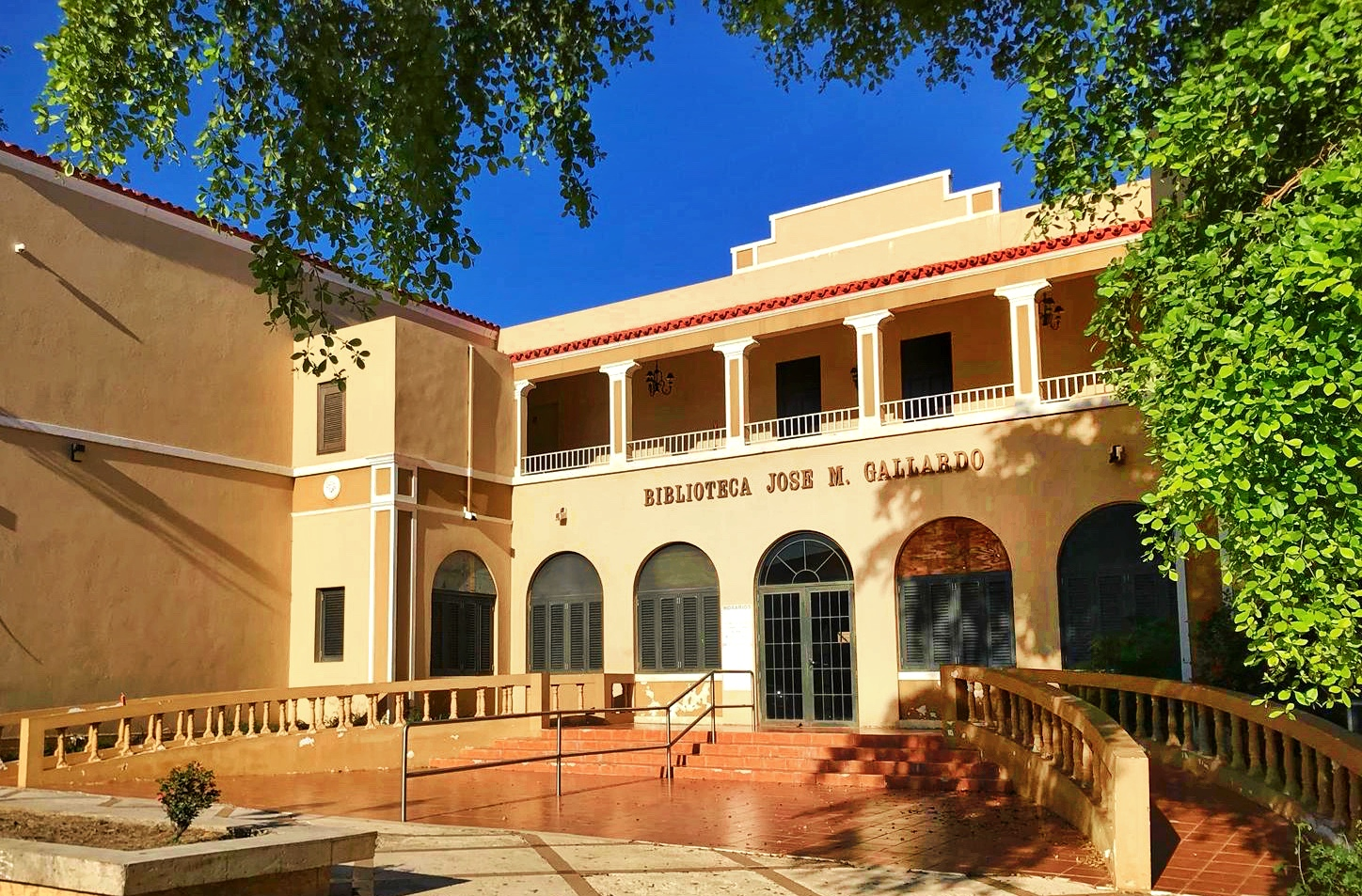
- The building in 2018.

- Location within Puerto Rico
- Location: Junction of Paseo Escuté and Algarín Street, Juncos, Puerto Rico
- Coordinates: 18°13′41″N 65°55′27″W
- Built: 1940
- Architect: Department of the Interior
- Architectural style: Beaux Arts Mission/Spanish Revival
- NRHP reference No.: 12000937
- Added to NRHP: November 14, 2012

The José Miguel Gallardo School (Spanish: Escuela José Miguel Gallardo) is a historic school located in Juncos, Puerto Rico. The school was named after academic and politician José Miguel Gallardo. The main structure of the school today serves as a public library, and it was added to the United States National Register of Historic Places in 2012.
