= Puerto Rico Highway 188 =

Highway in Puerto Rico

Highway 188
- Ruta 188
- Carretera Don Luis A. Ferré Aguayo

Route information
- Maintained by Puerto Rico DTPW
- Length: 5.8 km (3.6 mi)

Major junctions
- South end: PR-3 / PR-9188 in Canóvanas
- North end: PR-187 in Loíza barrio-pueblo

Location
- Country: United States
- Territory: Puerto Rico
- Municipalities: Canóvanas, Loíza

Highway system
- Roads in Puerto Rico; List
← PR-187	→ PR-189
← PR-9185	PR-9188	→ PR-9189

Puerto Rico Highway 188 (PR-188) is a north–south highway that travels from Canóvanas, Puerto Rico to Loíza. It begins at its intersection with PR-3 and PR-9188 in Canóvanas and ends at its junction with PR-187 near downtown Loíza.

== Major intersections ==
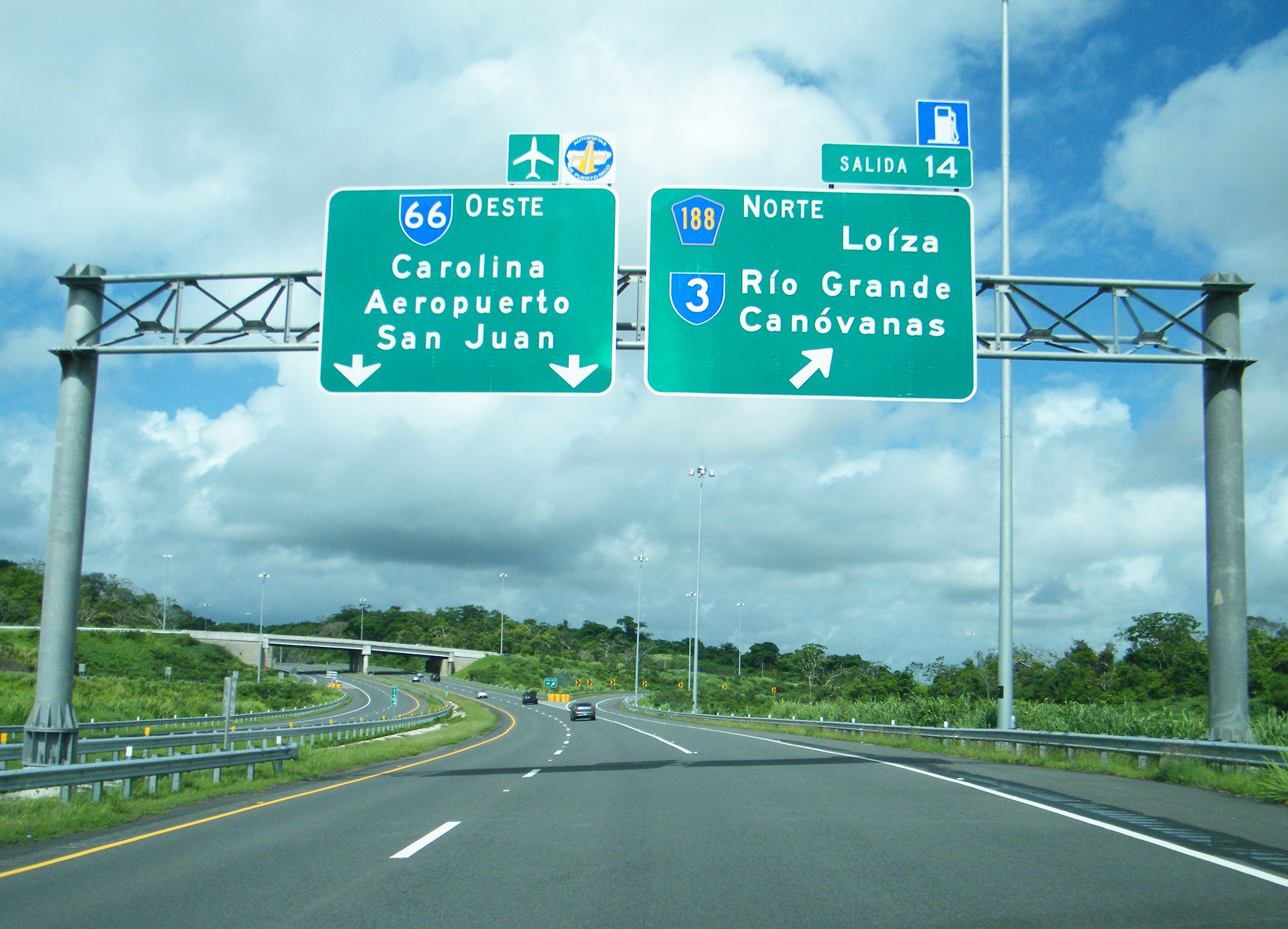
PR-66 west at exit 14 to PR-3 and PR-188 north in Canóvanas

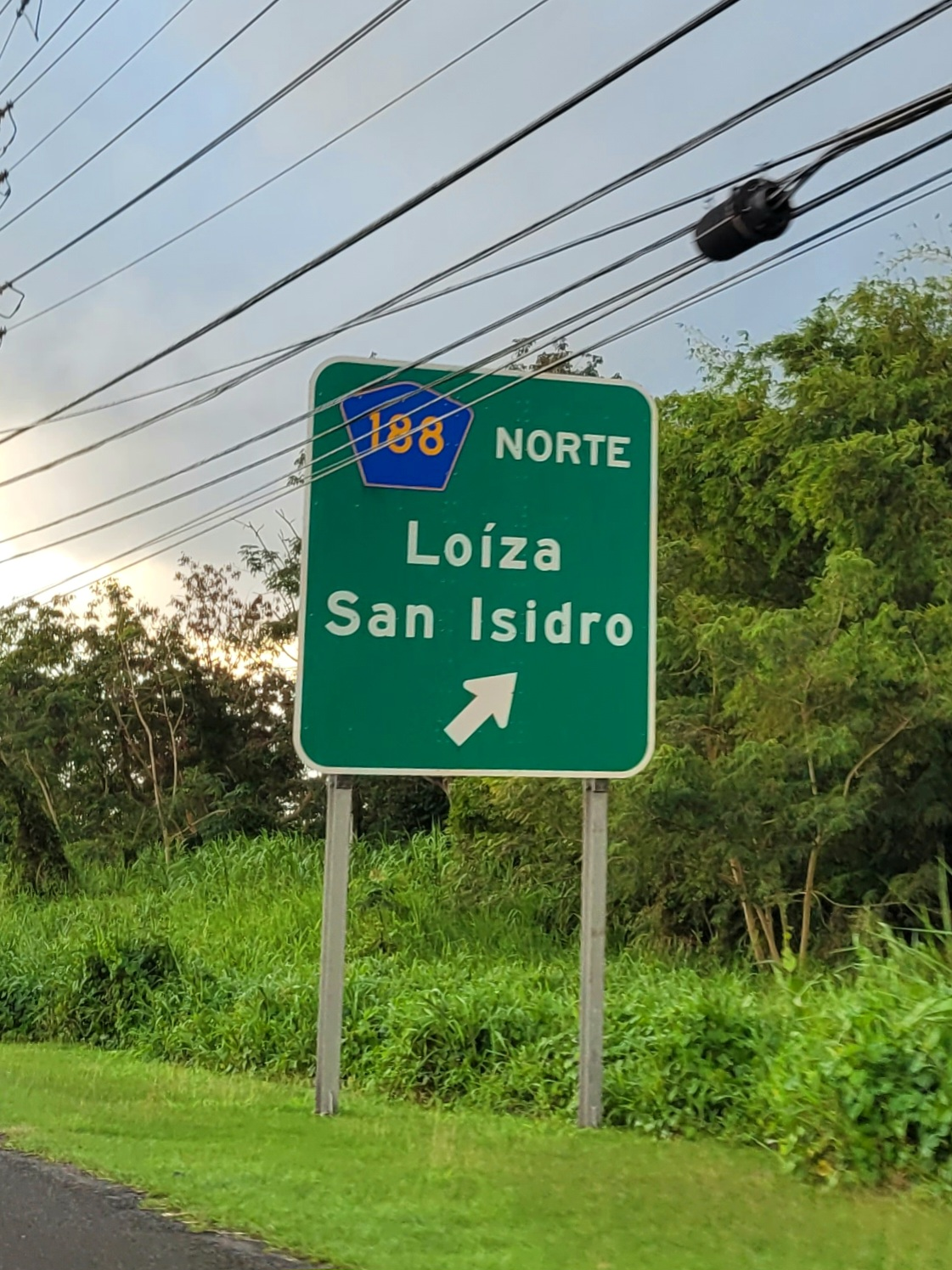
PR-3 west at PR-188 intersection in Canóvanas

Municipality	Location	km	mi	Destinations	Notes
Canóvanas	Canóvanas	0.0	0.0	PR-9188 to PR-66 – Carolina, San Juan, Fajardo	Continuation beyond PR-3
Canóvanas	Canóvanas	0.0	0.0	PR-3 – Río Grande, Luquillo, Canóvanas, Carolina	Southern terminus of PR-188 and northern terminus of PR-9188; PR-66 exit 14
Loíza	Loíza barrio-pueblo	5.8	3.6	PR-187 – Río Grande, Carolina, San Juan	Eastern terminus of PR-188
1.000 mi = 1.609 km; 1.000 km = 0.621 mi

== Related route ==
Highway 9188
- Location: Canóvanas
- Length: 1.1 km (0.68 mi)

Puerto Rico Highway 9188 (PR-9188) is a connector that branches off from its intersection with PR-3 and PR-188, and ends at PR-66. The entire route is located in Canóvanas, Canóvanas.

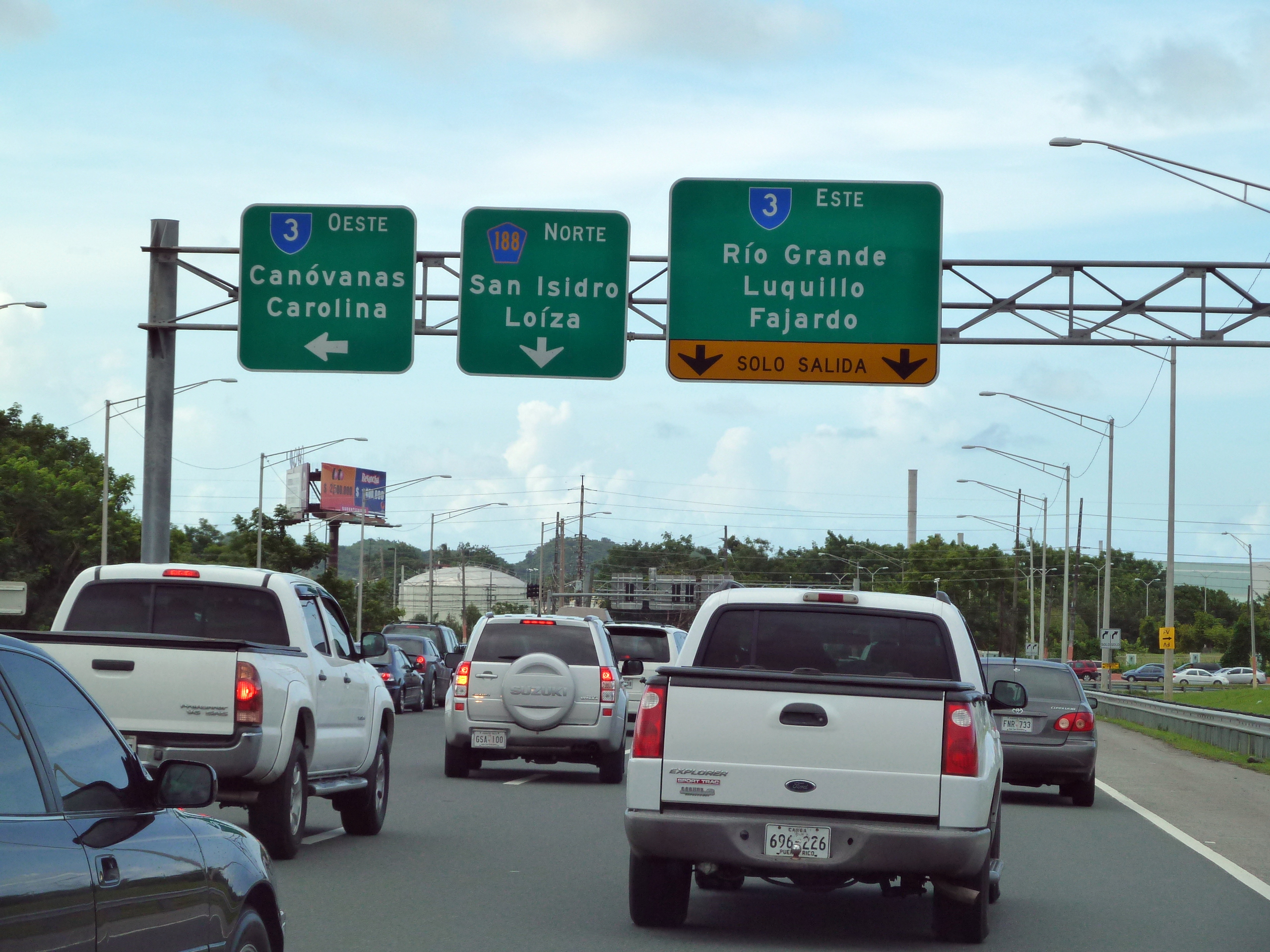
PR-9188 north at PR-3 and PR-188 intersection in Canóvanas

km	mi	Destinations	Notes
1.1	0.68	PR-66 – Río Grande, Luquillo, Fajardo, Carolina, Aeropuerto, San Juan	Trumpet interchange; southern terminus of PR-9188; PR-66 exit 14
0.0	0.0	PR-3 – Canóvanas, Carolina, Río Grande, Luquillo, Fajardo	Northern terminus of PR-9188 and southern terminus of PR-188; El Yunque National Forest access is via PR-3 east
0.0	0.0	PR-188 north – San Isidro, Loíza	Continuation beyond PR-3
1.000 mi = 1.609 km; 1.000 km = 0.621 mi
