= Alfredo Alejandro Carrión =

Puerto Rican politician

Mayor of Juncos
- Incumbent
- Assumed office January 14, 2001
- Preceded by: Gilberto Conde

Personal details
- Born: November 11, 1948 (age 77) Las Piedras, Puerto Rico
- Party: Popular Democratic Party (PPD)
- Other political affiliations: Democratic
- Spouse: Medelicia Peña Ortíz (Deceased - October 31, 2018)
- Children: Lizette; Kelvin; Kenia; Avilio
- Education: University of Turabo (BBA)

Military service
- Allegiance: United States of America
- Branch/service: United States Army

Alfredo "Papo" Alejandro Carrión (born November 11, 1948) is a Puerto Rican politician and the current mayor of Juncos. Alejandro is affiliated with the Popular Democratic Party (PPD) and has served as mayor since 2001.

== Early years and studies ==
Alfredo Alejandro Carrión was born in Las Piedras, Puerto Rico on November 11, 1948. He is the second of five children, born to Elisa Carrión Cosme and Obdulio Alejandro Rivera.

After his Military service in the United States Army, Alejandro completed a Bachelor's degree in Business Administration from the University of Turabo.

== Political career ==
Alejandro was first elected as mayor of Juncos at the 2000 general election. After that, he has been reelected six times (2004, 2008, 2012, 2016, 2020, 2024).

== Personal life ==
Alejandro was married to Medelicia Peña Ortiz, until her death on October 31, 2018. They had four children together: Lizette, Kelvin, Kenia and Avilio.
