= Gurabo Arriba =

Barrio of Juncos, Puerto Rico

- Barrio
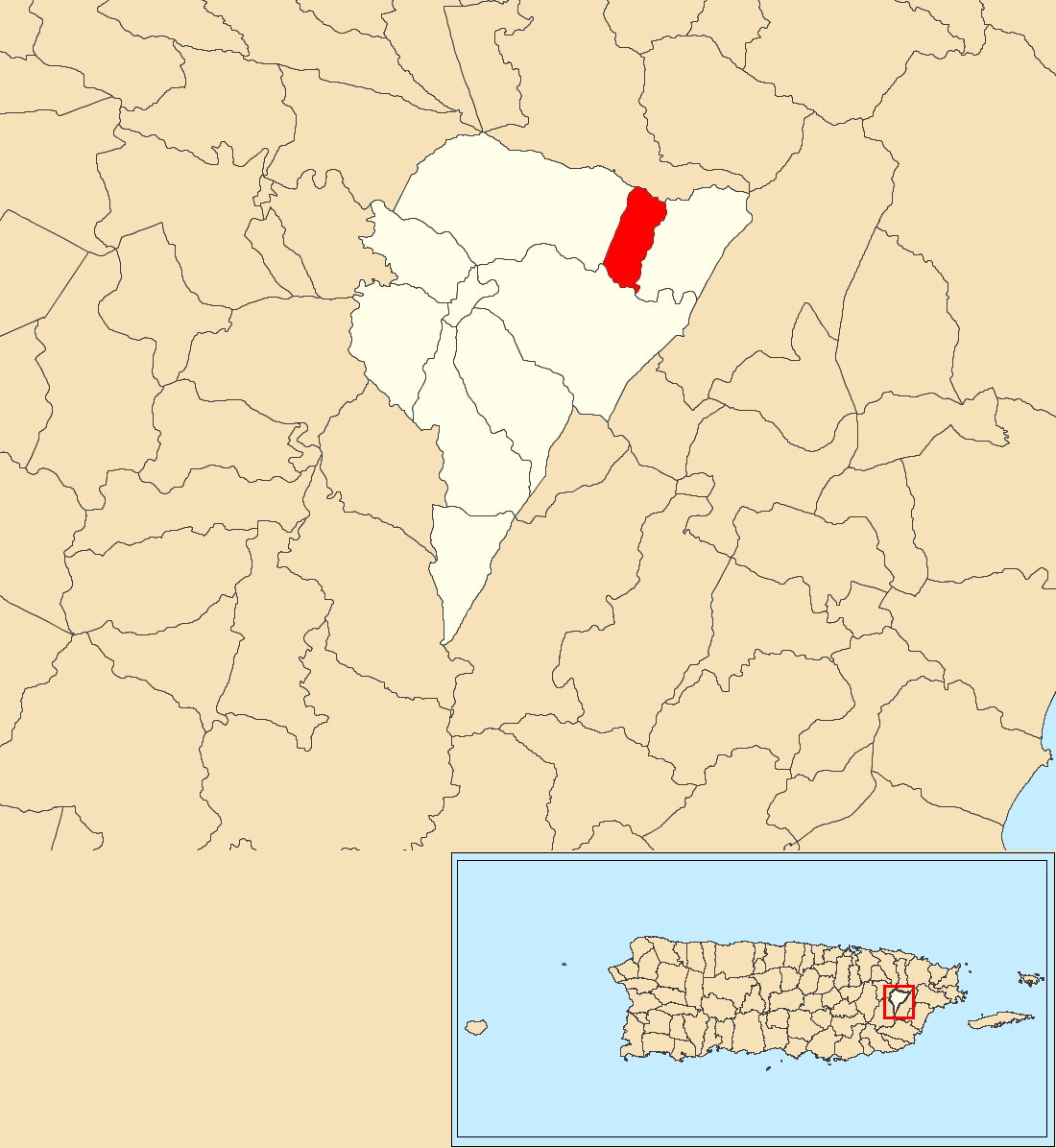
- Location of Gurabo Arriba within the municipality of Juncos shown in red

- Location of Puerto Rico
- Coordinates: 18°14′47″N 65°52′48″W
- Commonwealth: Puerto Rico
- Municipality: Juncos

Area
  - Total: 0.96 sq mi (2.5 km^{2})
  - Land: 0.96 sq mi (2.5 km^{2})
  - Water: 0 sq mi (0 km^{2})
- Elevation: 643 ft (196 m)

Population (2010)
  - Total: 569
  - Density: 592.7/sq mi (228.8/km^{2})
- Source: 2010 Census
- Time zone: UTC−4 (AST)

Gurabo Arriba is a barrio in the municipality of Juncos, Puerto Rico. Its population in 2010 was 569.

== History ==
Gurabo Arriba was in Spain's gazetteers until Puerto Rico was ceded by Spain in the aftermath of the Spanish–American War under the terms of the Treaty of Paris of 1898 and became an unincorporated territory of the United States. In 1899, the United States Department of War conducted a census of Puerto Rico finding that the combined population of Caimito and Gurabo Arriba barrios was 1,295.

Historical population
Census	Pop.	Note	%±
1910	521		—
1920	556		6.7%
1930	817		46.9%
1940	721		−11.8%
1950	643		−10.8%
1960	482		−25.0%
1970	448		−7.1%
1980	486		8.5%
1990	705		45.1%
2000	589		−16.5%
2010	569		−3.4%
U.S. Decennial Census; 1900 (N/A) 1910-1930; 1930-1950 1980-2000 2010

== See also ==
- List of communities in Puerto Rico
