= Turabo, Caguas, Puerto Rico =

Barrio of Puerto Rico

Turabo
- Barrio
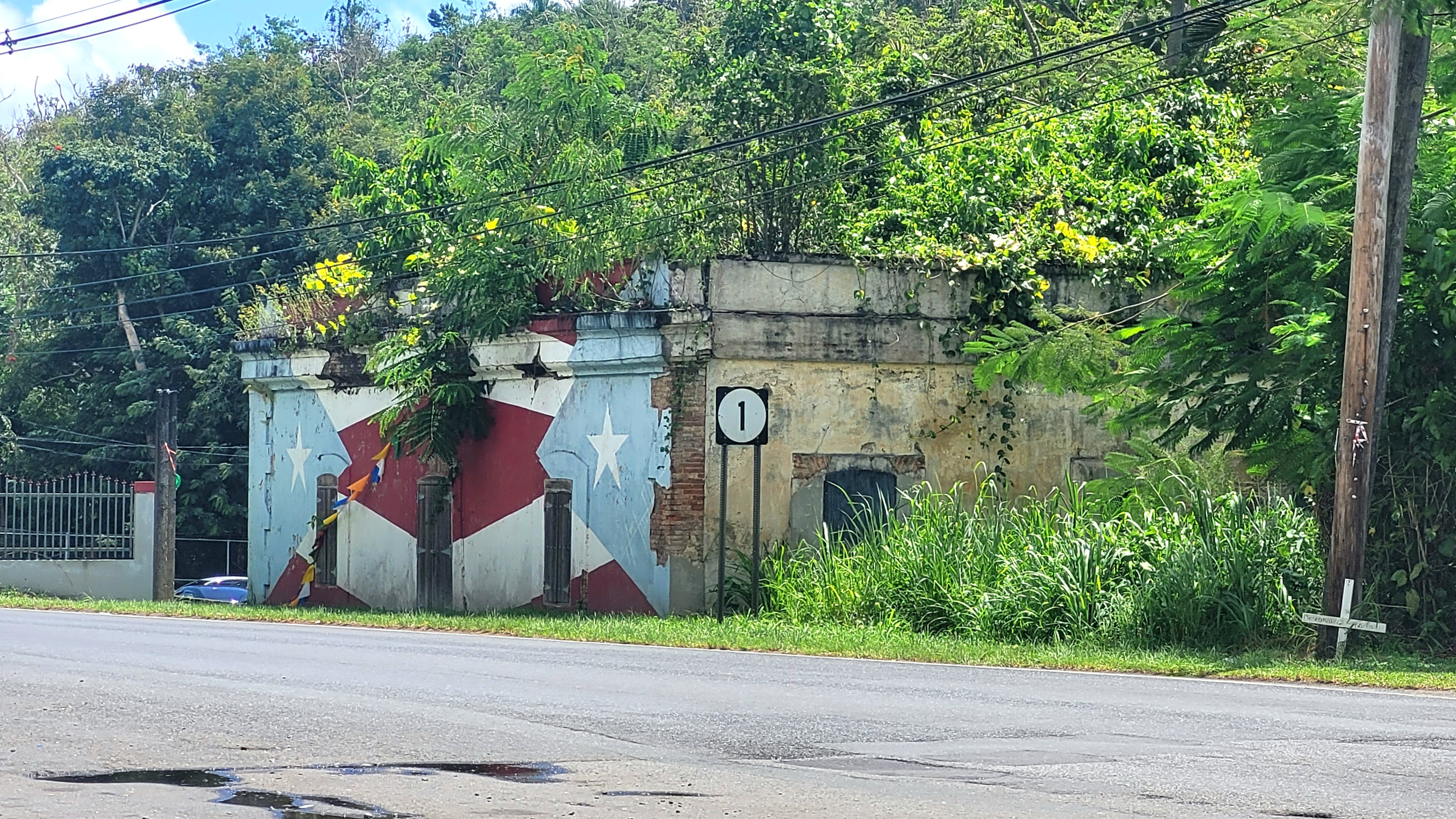
- Puerto Rico Highway 1 in Turabo

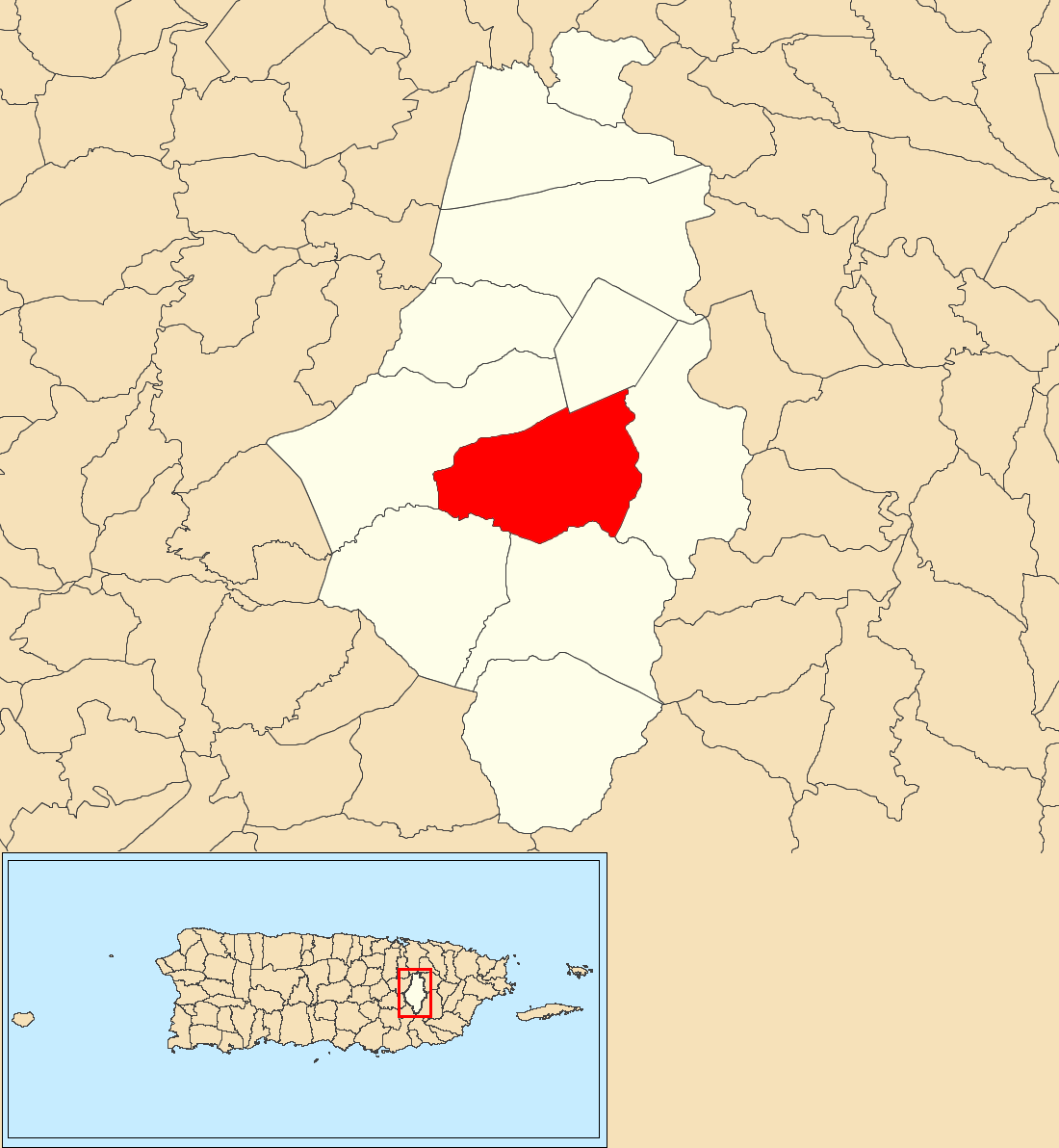
- Location of Turabo within the municipality of Caguas shown in red

- Location of Puerto Rico
- Coordinates: 18°12′09″N 66°02′47″W
- Commonwealth: Puerto Rico
- Municipality: Caguas

Area
  - Total: 5.50 sq mi (14.2 km^{2})
  - Land: 5.47 sq mi (14.2 km^{2})
  - Water: 0.03 sq mi (0.078 km^{2})
- Elevation: 279 ft (85 m)

Population (2010)
  - Total: 15,739
  - Density: 2,877.3/sq mi (1,110.9/km^{2})
- Source: 2010 Census
- Time zone: UTC−4 (AST)
- ZIP Codes: 00725, 00726, 00727
- Area codes: 787, 939

Turabo or Villa Turabo is a barrio in the municipality of Caguas, Puerto Rico. Its population in 2010 was 15,739.

== History ==
Turabo was in Spain's gazetteers until Puerto Rico was ceded by Spain in the aftermath of the Spanish–American War under the terms of the Treaty of Paris of 1898 and became an unincorporated territory of the United States. In 1899, the United States Department of War conducted a census of Puerto Rico finding that the population of Turabo barrio was 1,557.

Historical population
Census	Pop.	Note	%±
1900	1,557		—
1910	2,148		38.0%
1920	3,572		66.3%
1930	3,891		8.9%
1940	3,052		−21.6%
1950	2,286		−25.1%
1960	3,334		45.8%
1970	0		−100.0%
1980	16,090		—
1990	16,223		0.8%
2000	15,600		−3.8%
2010	15,739		0.9%
U.S. Decennial Census; 1899 (shown as 1900) 1910-1930; 1930-1950 1980-2000 2010

== See also ==
- List of communities in Puerto Rico
