= Lirios =

Barrio of Juncos, Puerto Rico

- Barrio
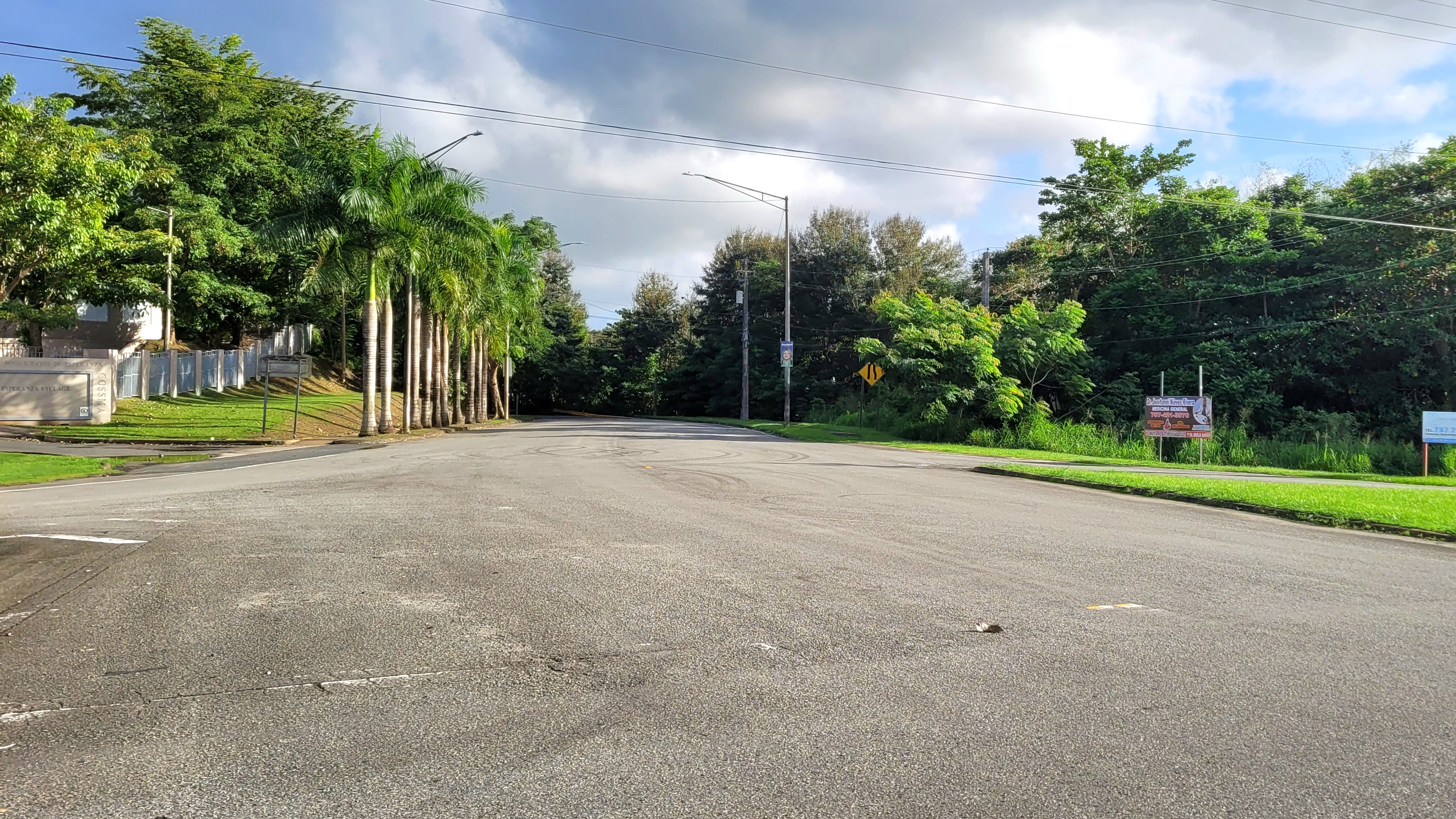
- Puerto Rico Highway 933 between Mamey and Lirios

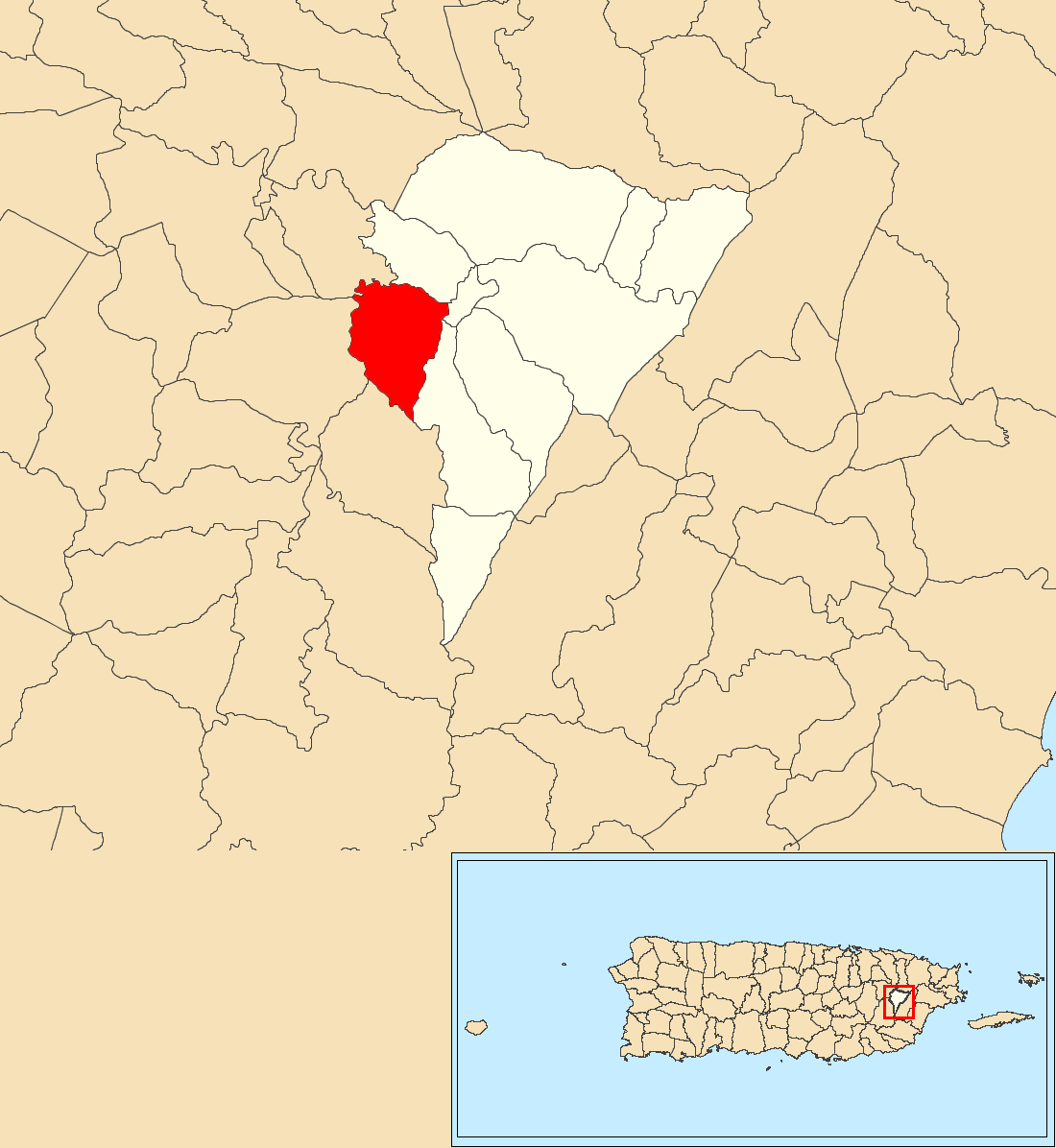
- Location of Lirios within the municipality of Juncos shown in red

- Location of Puerto Rico
- Coordinates: 18°12′45″N 65°56′22″W
- Commonwealth: Puerto Rico
- Municipality: Juncos

Area
  - Total: 2.38 sq mi (6.2 km^{2})
  - Land: 2.38 sq mi (6.2 km^{2})
  - Water: 0 sq mi (0 km^{2})
- Elevation: 489 ft (149 m)

Population (2010)
  - Total: 5,646
  - Density: 2,372.3/sq mi (916.0/km^{2})
- Source: 2010 Census
- Time zone: UTC−4 (AST)

Lirios is a barrio in the municipality of Juncos, Puerto Rico. Its population in 2010 was 5,646.

== History ==
Lirios was in Spain's gazetteers until Puerto Rico was ceded by Spain in the aftermath of the Spanish–American War under the terms of the Treaty of Paris of 1898 and became an unincorporated territory of the United States. In 1899, the United States Department of War conducted a census of Puerto Rico finding that the population of Lirios barrio was 815.

Historical population
Census	Pop.	Note	%±
1900	815		—
1910	1,067		30.9%
1920	1,164		9.1%
1930	1,986		70.6%
1940	2,397		20.7%
1950	1,830		−23.7%
1960	2,841		55.2%
1970	0		−100.0%
1980	3,479		—
1990	4,452		28.0%
2000	5,499		23.5%
2010	5,646		2.7%
U.S. Decennial Census; 1899 (shown as 1900) 1910-1930; 1930-1950 1980-2000 2010

== See also ==
- List of communities in Puerto Rico
