= Rincón, Gurabo, Puerto Rico =

Barrio of Puerto Rico

Rincón
- Barrio
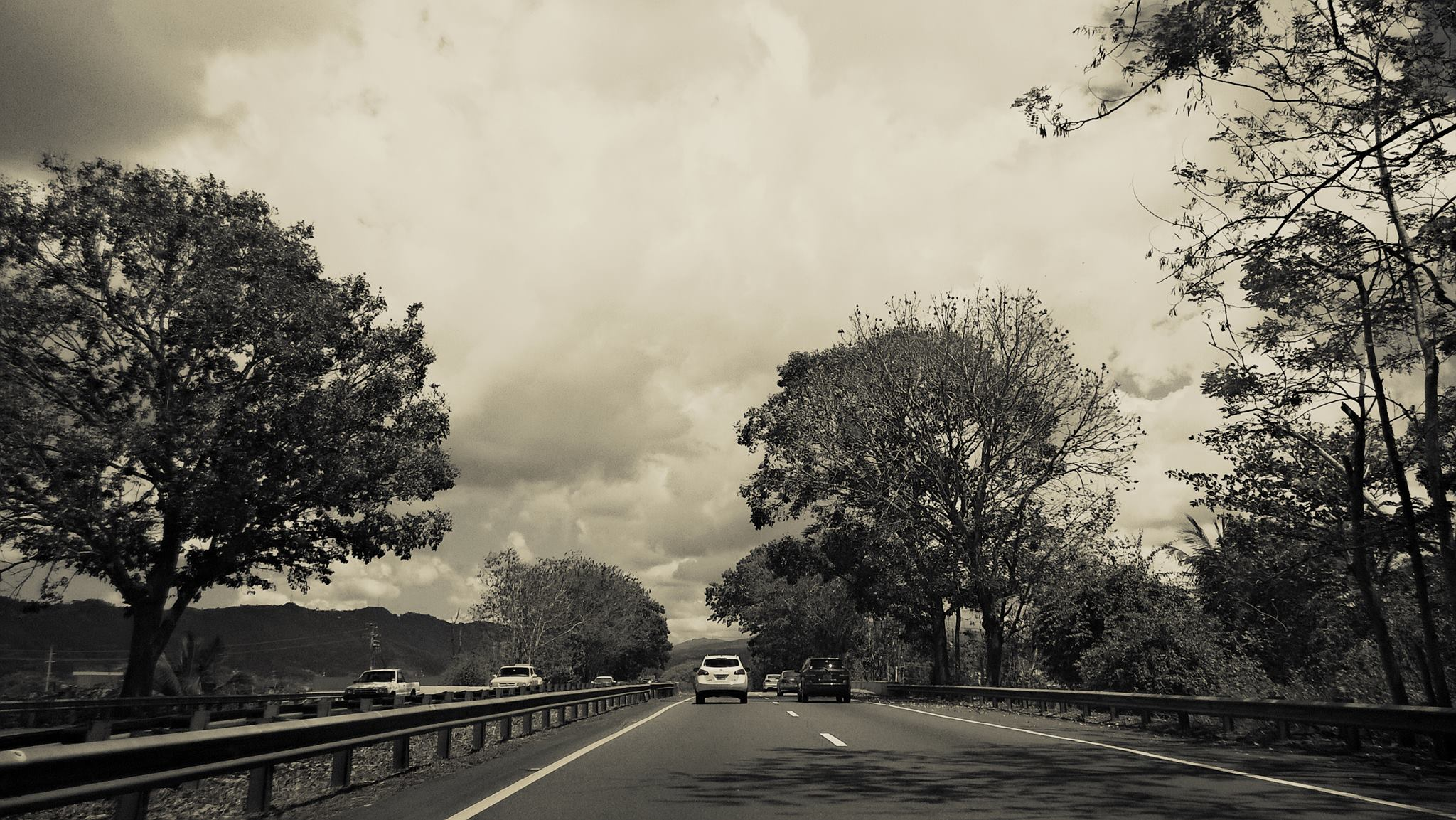
- Puerto Rico Highway 30 in Rincón barrio

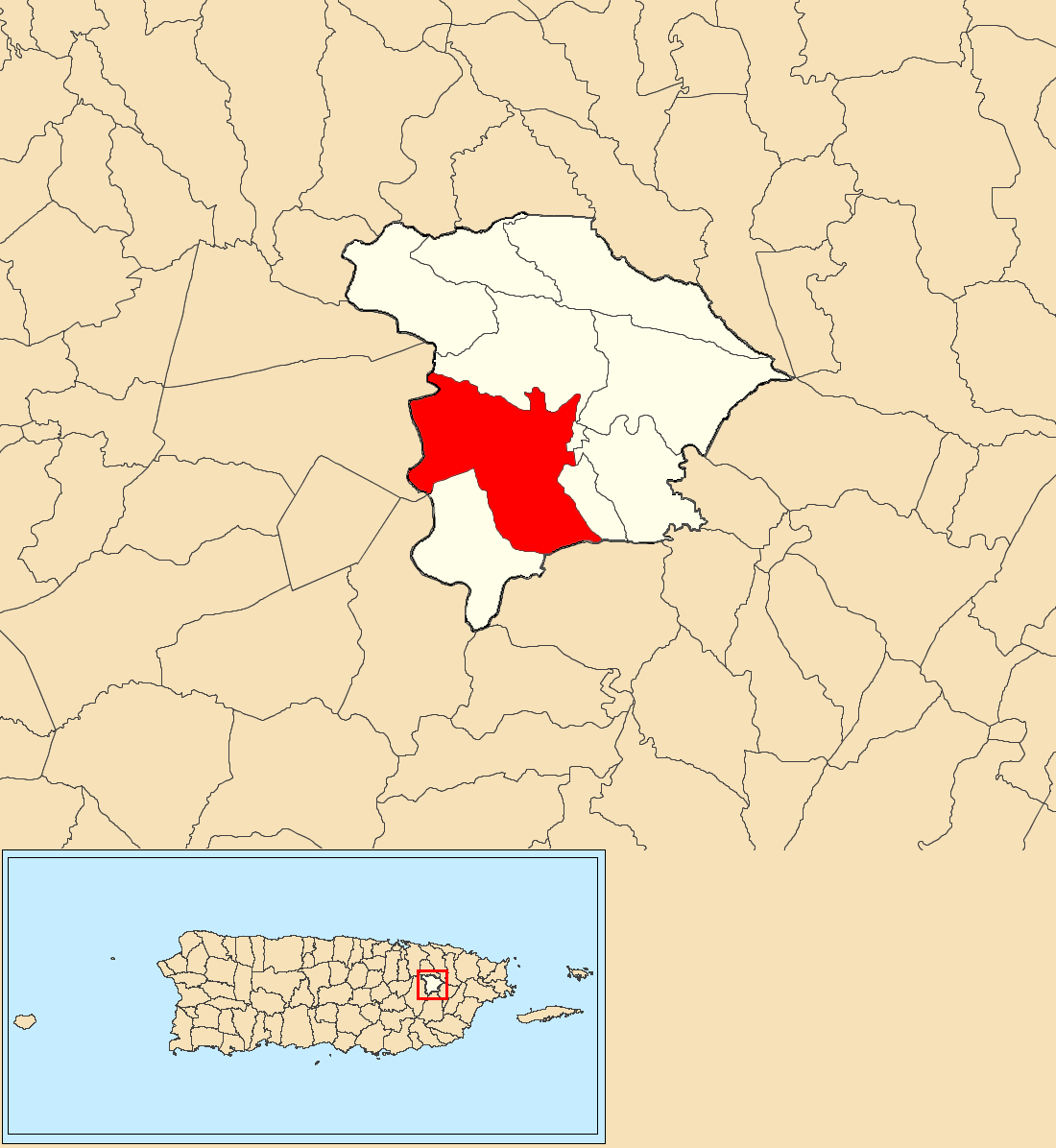
- Location of Rincón within the municipality of Gurabo shown in red

- Location of Puerto Rico
- Coordinates: 18°14′58″N 65°59′24″W
- Commonwealth: Puerto Rico
- Municipality: Gurabo

Area
  - Total: 5.44 sq mi (14.1 km^{2})
  - Land: 5.33 sq mi (13.8 km^{2})
  - Water: 0.11 sq mi (0.28 km^{2})
- Elevation: 203 ft (62 m)

Population (2010)
  - Total: 10,967
  - Density: 2,057.6/sq mi (794.4/km^{2})
- Source: 2010 Census
- Time zone: UTC−4 (AST)
- ZIP Code: 00778

Rincón is a barrio in the municipality of Gurabo, Puerto Rico. Its population in 2010 was 10,967.

== History ==
Rincón was in Spain's gazetteers until Puerto Rico was ceded by Spain in the aftermath of the Spanish–American War under the terms of the Treaty of Paris of 1898 and became an unincorporated territory of the United States. In 1899, the United States Department of War conducted a census of Puerto Rico finding that the population of Rincón barrio was 1,155.

Historical population
Census	Pop.	Note	%±
1900	1,155		—
1910	1,353		17.1%
1920	1,787		32.1%
1930	2,121		18.7%
1940	1,909		−10.0%
1950	2,049		7.3%
1960	3,351		63.5%
1970	0		−100.0%
1980	7,458		—
1990	8,706		16.7%
2000	10,663		22.5%
2010	10,967		2.9%
U.S. Decennial Census; 1899 (shown as 1900) 1910-1930; 1930-1950 1980-2000 2010

== Sectors ==
Barrios (which are, in contemporary times, roughly comparable to minor civil divisions) in turn are further subdivided into smaller local populated place areas/units called sectores (sectors in English). The types of sectores may vary, from normally sector to urbanización to reparto to barriada to residencial, among others.

The following sectors are in Rincón barrio:

Barriada Las Flores, Buena Vista Apartments, Condominio Villas del Este (Modena 1, 2, 3), Égida Gurabo Elderly Housing, Reparto San José, Residencial Luis del Carmen Echevarría, Sector Agosto, Sector Bella Vista, Sector Cabezudo, Sector Castro, Sector Cayano, Sector Gómez, Sector Jalisco, Sector La Finca, Sector Leal, Sector Los Calderón, Sector Los Cuadrado, Sector Los Rodríguez, Sector Matanzo, Sector Matías Jiménez, Sector Pello Cruz, Sector Perdomo, Sector Pérez, Sector Piro Cruz, Sector Sánchez Cabezudo, Sector Sánchez, Urbanización Campamento, Urbanización El Vivero, Urbanización Los Maestros, Urbanización O'Reilly, Urbanización Senderos de Gurabo, Urbanización Toscana, Urbanización Villa Alegre, Urbanización Villa del Carmen, Urbanización Villa Marina I, Urbanización Villa Marina II, Urbanización Villas de Gurabo, and Urbanización Villas de Gurabo II.

== See also ==
- List of communities in Puerto Rico
- List of barrios and sectors of Gurabo, Puerto Rico
