= Valenciano (surname) =

Valenciano is a Spanish surname. It is a regional name denoting someone from Valencia. Notable people with the surname include:

- Dragos Dolanescu Valenciano (born 1975), Costa Rican politician
- Elena Valenciano (born 1960), Spanish politician
- Emilie Valenciano (born 1997), Costa Rican footballer
- Gab Valenciano (born 1988), Filipino actor and singer
- Gary Valenciano (born 1964), Filipino actor, singer-songwriter, and television host
- Iván Valenciano (born 1972), Colombian footballer
- Kiana Valenciano (born 1992), Filipino R&B singer and songwriter
- Giovanni Valenciano (born 1995), Businessman
- Jorge Valenciano (born 1978), American Petroleum Landman
