= Valenciano Arriba =

Barrio of Juncos, Puerto Rico

- Barrio
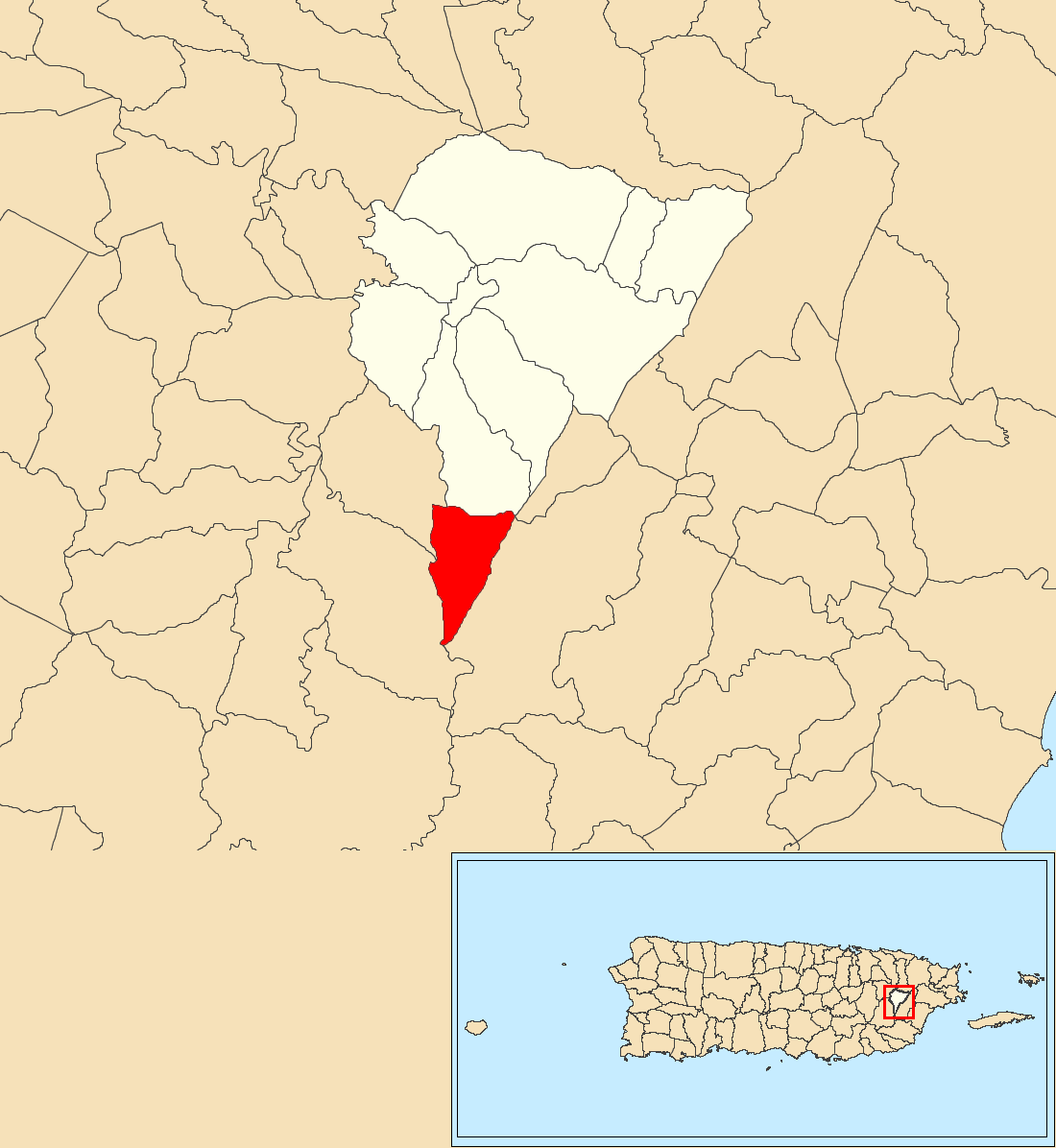
- Location of Valenciano Arriba within the municipality of Juncos shown in red

- Location of Puerto Rico
- Coordinates: 18°09′52″N 65°55′24″W
- Commonwealth: Puerto Rico
- Municipality: Juncos

Area
  - Total: 1.77 sq mi (4.6 km^{2})
  - Land: 1.77 sq mi (4.6 km^{2})
  - Water: 0 sq mi (0 km^{2})
- Elevation: 617 ft (188 m)

Population (2010)
  - Total: 1,202
  - Density: 679.1/sq mi (262.2/km^{2})
- Source: 2010 Census
- Time zone: UTC−4 (AST)

Valenciano Arriba is a barrio located in the municipality of Juncos in the Commonwealth of Puerto Rico. According to the 2010 Census, it had a population of 1,202 inhabitants and a population density of 262.65 people per km2.

== History ==
Valenciano Arriba was in Spain's gazetteers until Puerto Rico was ceded by Spain in the aftermath of the Spanish–American War under the terms of the Treaty of Paris of 1898 and became an unincorporated territory of the United States. In 1899, the United States Department of War conducted a census of Puerto Rico finding that the combined population of Valenciano Abajo and Valenciano Arriba barrios was 1,206.

Historical population
Census	Pop.	Note	%±
1910	346		—
1920	533		54.0%
1930	740		38.8%
1940	730		−1.4%
1950	665		−8.9%
1960	606		−8.9%
1970	574		−5.3%
1980	849		47.9%
1990	870		2.5%
2000	1,250		43.7%
2010	1,202		−3.8%
U.S. Decennial Census; 1900 (N/A) 1910-1930; 1930-1950 1980-2000 2010

== Geography ==
Valenciano Arriba is located at coordinates 18°9′52″N 65°55′24″W. According to the United States Census Bureau, Valenciano Arriba has a total area of 4.58 km2, all of which is land.

== Demographics ==
According to the 2010 Census, there were 1,202 people residing in Valenciano Arriba. The population density was 262.65 people per km². Of the 1,202 inhabitants, 79.78% were White, 8.99% were African American, 0.83% were Native American, 5.41% were of other races, and 4.99% belonged to two or more races. Of the total population, 98.92% were Hispanic or Latino of any race.

== See also ==
- List of communities in Puerto Rico
