= Valenciano River =

River of Puerto Rico

Coordinates: 18.2374553°N 65.9196081°W

- Etymology: City of Valencia, Spain
- Native name: Río Valenciano (Spanish)

Location
- Commonwealth: Puerto Rico
- Municipality: Las Piedras

Physical characteristics
- Source
  - location: Municipality of Juncos, south of city
- Mouth
  - location: Confluence with the Río Gurabo, north of city

The Valenciano River (Spanish: Río Valenciano) is a river in eastern Puerto Rico which flows through the municipalities of Juncos and Las Piedras, Puerto Rico. After Juncos, the river reaches a confluence on the left bank of the Río Gurabo, which is itself a tributary of the Río Grande de Loíza which flows north into the Atlantic Ocean. Since Hurricane Maria in September 2017, the data on river drainage has not been updated.

Juncos municipality is known as Spanish: La Ciudad del Valenciano, The Valencian's City or Spanish: Los Mulos del Valenciano), The Valencian's Mules.

== See also ==
- List of rivers of Puerto Rico
