= Valenciano Abajo =

Barrio of Juncos, Puerto Rico

- Barrio
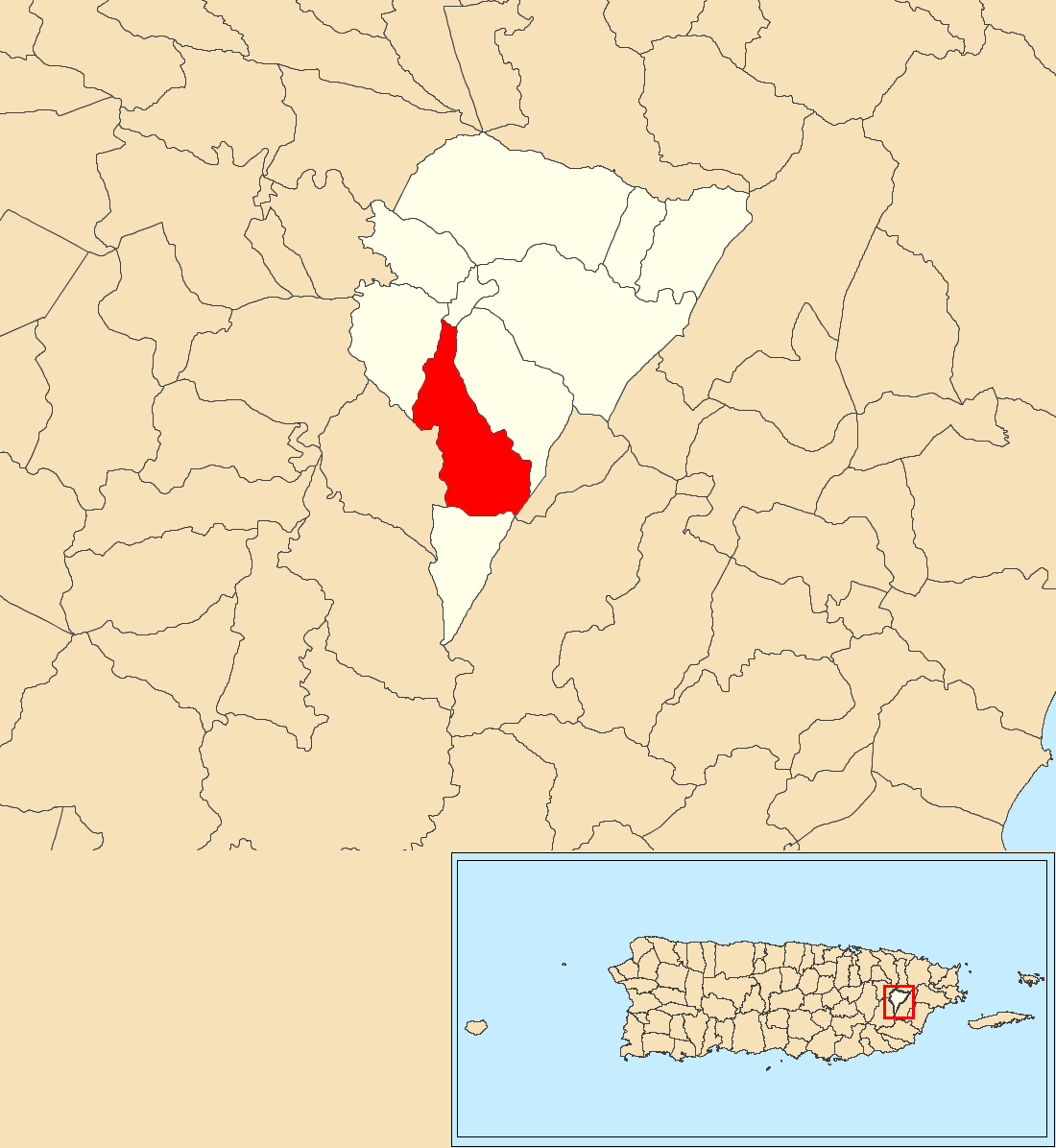
- Location of Valenciano Abajo within the municipality of Juncos shown in red

- Location of Puerto Rico
- Coordinates: 18°11′36″N 65°55′21″W
- Commonwealth: Puerto Rico
- Municipality: Juncos

Area
  - Total: 2.97 sq mi (7.7 km^{2})
  - Land: 2.95 sq mi (7.6 km^{2})
  - Water: 0.02 sq mi (0.052 km^{2})
- Elevation: 374 ft (114 m)

Population (2010)
  - Total: 3,582
  - Density: 1,214.2/sq mi (468.8/km^{2})
- Source: 2010 Census
- Time zone: UTC−4 (AST)

Valenciano Abajo is a barrio in the municipality of Juncos, Puerto Rico. Its population in 2010 was 3,582.

== History ==
Valenciano Abajo was in Spain's gazetteers until Puerto Rico was ceded by Spain in the aftermath of the Spanish–American War under the terms of the Treaty of Paris of 1898 and became an unincorporated territory of the United States. In 1899, the United States Department of War conducted a census of Puerto Rico finding that the combined population of Valenciano Abajo and Valenciano Arriba barrios was 1,206.

Historical population
Census	Pop.	Note	%±
1910	754		—
1920	985		30.6%
1930	1,048		6.4%
1940	1,876		79.0%
1950	1,640		−12.6%
1960	1,613		−1.6%
1970	1,581		−2.0%
1980	1,908		20.7%
1990	2,802		46.9%
2000	3,782		35.0%
2010	3,582		−5.3%
U.S. Decennial Census; 1900 (N/A) 1910-1930; 1930-1950 1980-2000 2010

== See also ==
- List of communities in Puerto Rico
