= Valencian =

Valencian can refer to:

- Something related to the Valencian Community (a.k.a. Valencian Country) in Spain
- Something related to the city of Valencia
- Something related to the province of Valencia in Spain
- Something related to the old Kingdom of Valencia
- The Valencian language, commonly regarded as a variety of the Catalan language
- Valencians, the natives of the Valencian Community
- Valencians, members of Pembroke College, Cambridge
