= Juncos, Puerto Rico =

Town and municipality in Puerto Rico

Juncos Municipio Autónomo de Juncos
- Town and Municipality
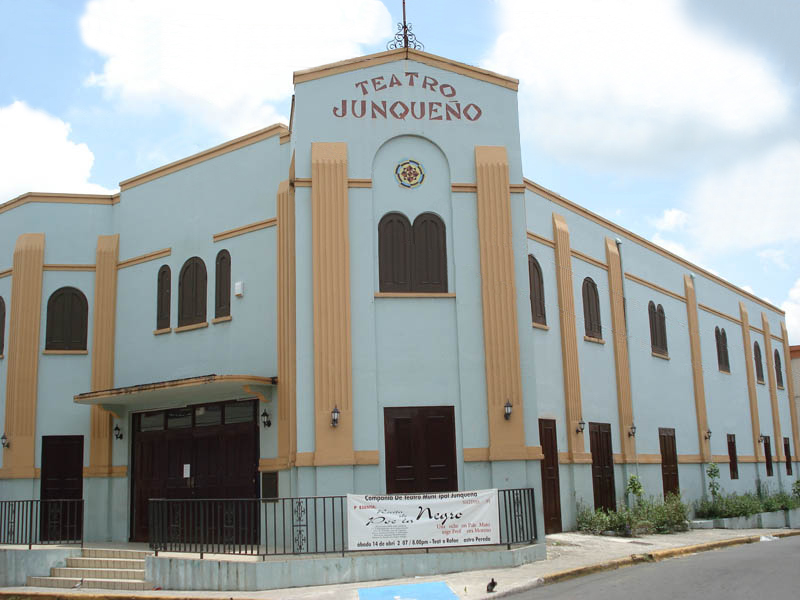
- Theater in Juncos

- Flag Coat of arms
- Nicknames: "La Ciudad del Valenciano", "Los Mulos del Valenciano"
- Anthem: "Juncos Mi Pequeño París"
- Map of Puerto Rico highlighting Juncos Municipality
- Coordinates: 18°13′39″N 65°55′16″W
- Sovereign state: United States
- Commonwealth: Puerto Rico
- Settled: 1792
- Founded: August 2, 1797
- Founder: Tomás Pizarro
- Barrios: 10 barrios: Caimito; Ceiba Norte; Ceiba Sur; Gurabo Abajo; Gurabo Arriba; Juncos barrio-pueblo; Lirios; Mamey; Valenciano Abajo; Valenciano Arriba

Government
  - Mayor: Alfredo Alejandro Carrión (PPD)
  - Senatorial dist.: 7 – Humacao
  - Representative dist.: 33

Area
  - Total: 26.60 sq mi (68.89 km^{2})
  - Land: 26.59 sq mi (68.86 km^{2})
  - Water: 0.012 sq mi (0.03 km^{2})

Population (2020)
  - Total: 37,012
  - Estimate (2025): 36,639 ▼
  - Rank: 29th in Puerto Rico
  - Density: 1,392/sq mi (537.5/km^{2})
- Demonym: Junqueño

Ethnicity (2000 Census)
  - White: 93.5%
  - Black: 7.2%
  - American Indian/AN: 0.0%
  - Asian: 0.0%
  - Native Hawaiian/PI: 0.0%
- Time zone: UTC-4 (AST)
- ZIP Code: 00777
- Area code: 787/939

Juncos (Spanish pronunciation: [ˈxuŋkos]) is a town and one of the 78 municipalities of Puerto Rico. It is located in the eastern central region of the island to the west of the Caguas Valley, south of Canóvanas and Carolina; southeast of Gurabo; east of San Lorenzo; and west of Las Piedras. Juncos is spread over 9 barrios and Juncos barrio-pueblo (the downtown area and administrative center of the city). It is part of the San Juan-Caguas-Guaynabo Metropolitan Statistical Area.

Juncos was founded on the request of Tomás Pizarro on August 2, 1797, having previously been a village which evolved from a small ranch, the Hatillo de los Juncos. This ranch was part of the Hato del Valenciano, which gave its name to the Río Valenciano which bisects the city before joining the Río Gurabo to the north of the settlement.

Juncos is Spanish for reeds.

== History ==
During the 17th century, large parts of the municipality were owned by the Hato Grande de los Delgado (The Delgados' Great Ranch). Another ranch, the Hato del Valenciano, was established and later divided into the Hatillo de los Lirios and the Hatillo de los Juncos. This second one became the village of Juncos in the 18th century and was given the status of a town on August 2, 1797. Reeds, which gave the city its name, feature in the center of its flag and the bottom of its coat of arms. The Hato del Valenciano is remembered in the name of the Río Valenciano, as well as the coat of arms of Valencia featuring in Juncos' coat of arms, in addition to the city's two nicknames of La Ciudad del Valenciano (The Valenciano City) and Los Mulos del Valenciano (The Valenciano's Mules).

Puerto Rico was ceded by Spain in the aftermath of the Spanish–American War under the terms of the Treaty of Paris of 1898 and became a territory of the United States. In 1899, the United States Department of War conducted a census of Puerto Rico finding that the population of Juncos was 8,429.

On September 20, 2017 Hurricane Maria struck Puerto Rico. Juncos had been declared a disaster zone a week earlier when Hurricane Irma made landfall only to be hit again. Destruction to homes and infrastructure was estimated at $25 million. Maria triggered numerous landslides in Juncos with its significant wind and rainfall.

== Symbols ==
The municipio has an official flag and coat of arms.

=== Flag ===
On the flag of Juncos, on a gold field, blue waving stripes cross horizontally in the lower half. These represent the Río Valenciano which bisects the city. Green reeds with red buds appear in a central point above the stripes, representing the city's name (Juncos is Spanish for reeds).

=== Coat of arms ===
Juncos' coat of arms is divided into four-quarters, with the upper left and lower right containing vertical stripes gold (or yellow) and gules (red) in reference to the Spanish region of Valencia and to its denomination as "Town of Valencia". The upper right quarter is blue with twelve silver stars to represent the Virgin Mary, and also features a cross confirming the city as part of Christendom. The lower right is split vertically between an image of a tobacco plant to represent the city's agriculture and a chimney to represent industrialization and sugar cane processing. Like the flag, a waving blue line representing the Río Valenciano crosses the shield horizontally.

The shield is topped with a civic crown in the shape of a three-towered castle. Underneath the shield lie the red-budded green reeds which gave the city its name, which features alongside its year of foundation (1797) at the very bottom.

== Geography ==
Juncos is in the central eastern part of the island.

=== Barrios ===
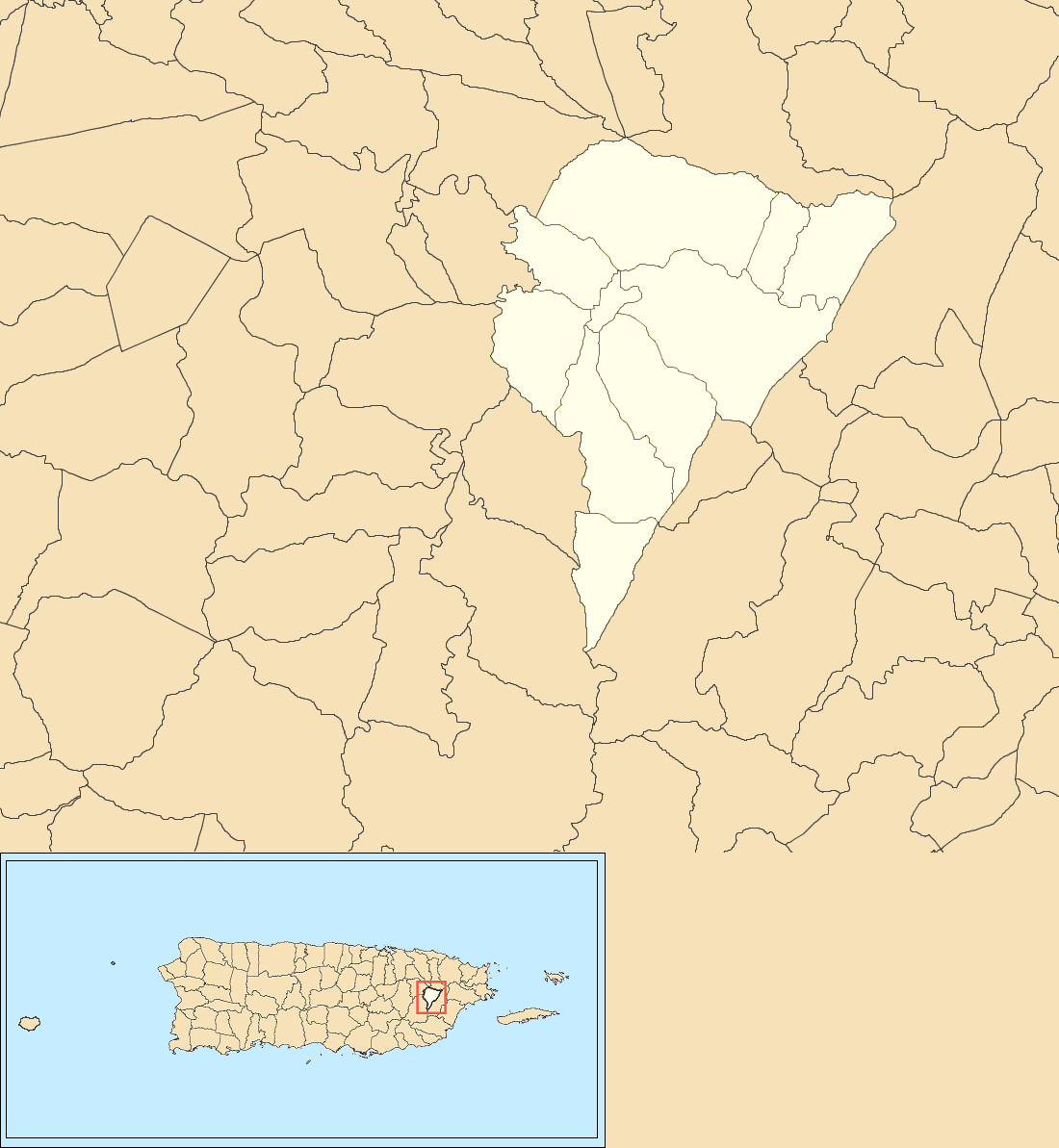
Subdivisions of Juncos.

Like all municipalities of Puerto Rico, Juncos is subdivided into barrios. The municipal buildings, central square and large Catholic church are located near the center of the municipality, in a barrio referred to as "el pueblo".

1. Caimito
2. Ceiba Norte
3. Ceiba Sur
4. Gurabo Abajo
5. Gurabo Arriba
6. Juncos barrio-pueblo
7. Lirios
8. Mamey
9. Valenciano Abajo
10. Valenciano Arriba

=== Sectors ===
Barrios (which are like minor civil divisions) and subbarrios, are further subdivided into smaller areas called sectores (sectors in English). The types of sectores may vary, from normally sector to urbanización to reparto to barriada to residencial, among others.

=== Special Communities ===
Comunidades Especiales de Puerto Rico (Special Communities of Puerto Rico) are marginalized communities whose citizens are experiencing a certain amount of social exclusion. A map shows these communities occur in nearly every municipality of the commonwealth. Of the 742 places that were on the list in 2014, the following barrios, communities, sectors, or neighborhoods were in Juncos: Flores, Santana 1 in Ceiba Norte, Canta Gallo, El Caracol, La Cuesta in Sector El Mangó, La Hormiga, Lirios Dorados in Hoyo Hondo and Rosalía in Sector El Mangó.

=== Climate ===
Climate data for Juncos, Puerto Rico (1991–2020 normals, extremes 1931–present)
Month	Jan	Feb	Mar	Apr	May	Jun	Jul	Aug	Sep	Oct	Nov	Dec	Year
Record high °F (°C)	96 (36)	95 (35)	94 (34)	96 (36)	97 (36)	96 (36)	100 (38)	98 (37)	99 (37)	97 (36)	96 (36)	98 (37)	100 (38)
Mean daily maximum °F (°C)	82.3 (27.9)	82.8 (28.2)	83.6 (28.7)	85.1 (29.5)	86.1 (30.1)	87.5 (30.8)	88.1 (31.2)	88.5 (31.4)	88.5 (31.4)	87.3 (30.7)	85.0 (29.4)	83.0 (28.3)	85.6 (29.8)
Daily mean °F (°C)	73.6 (23.1)	73.7 (23.2)	74.5 (23.6)	76.4 (24.7)	78.4 (25.8)	79.9 (26.6)	80.1 (26.7)	80.4 (26.9)	80.3 (26.8)	79.2 (26.2)	77.1 (25.1)	74.7 (23.7)	77.4 (25.2)
Mean daily minimum °F (°C)	65.0 (18.3)	64.7 (18.2)	65.4 (18.6)	67.6 (19.8)	70.6 (21.4)	72.2 (22.3)	72.2 (22.3)	72.3 (22.4)	72.0 (22.2)	71.1 (21.7)	69.2 (20.7)	66.4 (19.1)	69.1 (20.6)
Record low °F (°C)	50 (10)	50 (10)	50 (10)	50 (10)	50 (10)	58 (14)	57 (14)	58 (14)	56 (13)	55 (13)	51 (11)	42 (6)	42 (6)
Average precipitation inches (mm)	3.27 (83)	2.48 (63)	2.86 (73)	4.78 (121)	6.39 (162)	5.24 (133)	7.04 (179)	7.22 (183)	8.73 (222)	7.60 (193)	7.69 (195)	4.17 (106)	67.47 (1,714)
Average precipitation days (≥ 0.01 in)	16.0	14.0	11.8	12.8	17.0	15.3	16.4	16.5	16.4	16.6	18.8	17.5	189.1
Source: NOAA

== Demographics ==
Historical population
Census	Pop.	Note	%±
1900	8,429		—
1910	11,692		38.7%
1920	13,151		12.5%
1930	17,469		32.8%
1940	19,464		11.4%
1950	21,654		11.3%
1960	21,496		−0.7%
1970	21,814		1.5%
1980	25,397		16.4%
1990	30,612		20.5%
2000	36,452		19.1%
2010	40,290		10.5%
2020	37,012		−8.1%
2025 (est.)	36,639	▼	−1.0%
U.S. Decennial Census; 1899 (shown as 1900) 1910–1930; 1930–1950 1960–2000 2010 2020

== Tourism ==
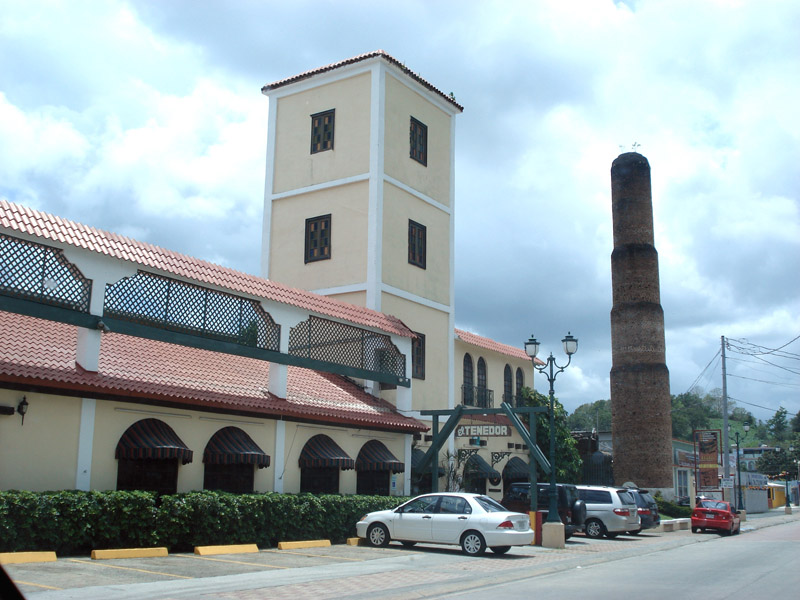
El Tenedor restaurant

- Juncos Sugar Mill
- Old Tobacco Farm
- Juncos Plaza Shopping Center
- Paseo Escuté
- Teatro Junqueño (Juncos Theater)
- El Tenedor Steakhouse

== Culture ==
=== Festivals and events ===
Juncos's patron saint festival is celebrated in December. The Fiestas Patronales Inmaculada Concepcion de Maria has religious and cultural significance and may feature parades, games, artisans, amusement rides, food, and live entertainment.

Other festivals and events celebrated in Juncos include:

- Modesto Carrión International Marathon – November
- La Mina Christian Music fest – July
- Plenazo Junqueño – February

== Economy ==
In the fertile plains of the Río Valenciano, coffee, fruits, sugar cane and tobacco are grown. The lower left quarter of the municipal coat of arms pay homage to tobacco cultivation and sugar cane processing.

Apparel, electronic machinery and electrical equipment, scientific instruments, pharmaceutical and biotechnology industries

Amgen, a biopharmaceutical company, has developed its largest manufacturing site in Juncos. It is a biotechnology campus for bulk manufacturing, with laboratories and manufacturing facilities that employs close to 3000 people. Amgen Puerto Rico received FDA approval for bulk manufacturing facilities for Nepogen (filgrastim), Neulasta (pegfilgrastim), Aranesp and Epogen. Amgen is also adding manufacturing capacity in Juncos to produce Denosumab.

In addition to Amgen there is a Medtronic and Becton Dickinson Caribe Ltd. in Juncos. The Colgate pharmaceutical facility has closed and production shifted to Mexico.

== Government ==
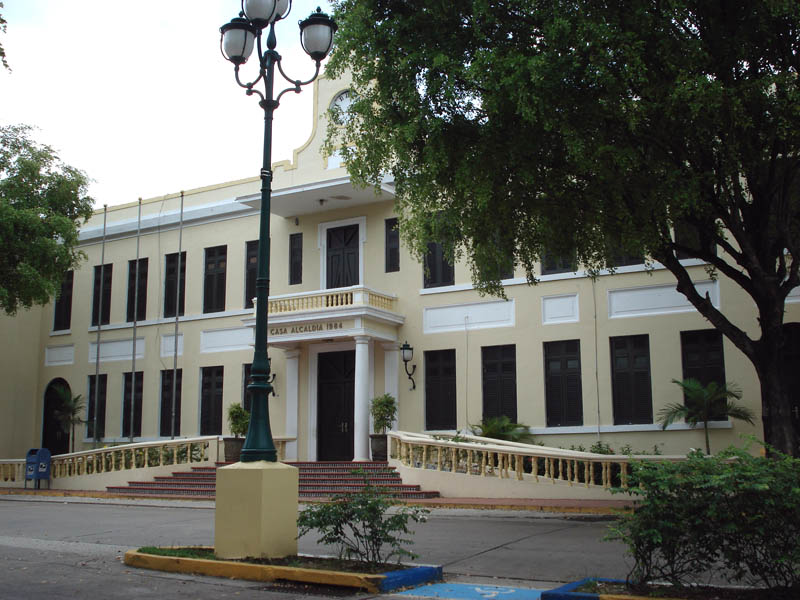
Juncos Mayoral House.

All municipalities in Puerto Rico are administered by a mayor, elected every four years. The current mayor of Juncos is Alfredo Alejandro Carrión, of the Popular Democratic Party (PPD). He was first elected at the 2000 general elections.

The city belongs to the Puerto Rico Senatorial district VII, which is represented by two Senators. In 2024, Wanda Soto Tolentino and Luis Daniel Colón La Santa were elected as District Senators.

The city is part of the 33 Representative District, which is represented by one representative. The current representative is Ángel Peña Ramírez of the New Progressive Party since 2008.

== Transportation ==
There are 28 bridges in Juncos.

Under the administration of Alfredo "Papo" Alejandro, Juncos started a collective ferry-on-wheels transportation system.

== Sports ==
Roberto Clemente Walker (1934–1972), later a double-World Series winner for the Pittsburgh Pirates, played baseball for Juncos before signing with the Santurce Crabbers in Puerto Rico's Professional League.

As is the national norm, volleyball and basketball are biggest sports in Juncos. In the year 2006–2007 the Valencianas de Juncos won the women's basketball and volleyball superior league national championship. In 2009, Juncos became the home of the 2008 Puerto Rico Soccer League champions, Sevilla Bayamon FC. The club is now known as Sevilla-FC Juncos since being relocated to the city. The team moved to Juncos due to ownership and financial problems and currently play in the Alfredo "Papo" Alejandro Stadium.

== Natives ==
- Félix Conde Falcón
- Gisselle
- Rita Moreno
- Alfredo Alejandro Carrión
- Rafael Celestino Benítez
- Juan Manuel López (boxer)
- Felicitas Mendez
- María de Lourdes Ramos Rivera
- José Luis Moneró
- Jon Z
- Ele A El Dominio

== See also ==
- List of Puerto Ricans
- History of Puerto Rico
- Did you know-Puerto Rico?
