= San Juan–Bayamón–Caguas metropolitan area =

Metropolitan area in Puerto Rico

San Juan metropolitan area Área metropolitana de San Juan
- Metropolitan Area
- NASA image of urban core of San Juan metro area in northeastern Puerto Rico, 2024
- Nicknames: Área Metro (Metro Area); La Losa ("the slab")
- Map of Puerto Rico with urbanized areas demarcated in orange to yellow, 2017
Statistical areas in Puerto Rico
Core municipalities of San Juan–Bayamón–Caguas MSA within San Juan–Bayamón CSA
Outer municipalities of San Juan–Bayamón–Caguas MSA within San Juan–Bayamón CSA
Arecibo MSA within San Juan–Bayamón CSA
Guayama MSA within San Juan–Bayamón CSA
Lares μSA within San Juan–Bayamón CSA
Utuado μSA within San Juan–Bayamón CSA
Coco μSA within San Juan–Bayamón CSA
Mayagüez–Aguadilla CSA & Ponce–Coamo CSA
Municipalities outside statistical areas
- Country: United States
- Territory: Puerto Rico
- Principal cities: San Juan, Bayamón, Caguas, and Guaynabo

Population (2023)
  - MSA: 2,035,733
  - CSA: 2,360,082
- Time zone: UTC−4

The San Juan–Bayamón–Caguas metropolitan area, most commonly known as the San Juan metropolitan area (Spanish: área metropolitana de San Juan), is the largest and most populous metropolitan statistical area (MSA) in Puerto Rico, concentrated in the capital of San Juan and surrounding municipalities, including Bayamón, Caguas, and Carolina, on the northeastern coastal plain of the main island. One of 6 metropolitan statistical areas in Puerto Rico, it is within the San Juan–Bayamón combined statistical area (CSA), which is one of 3 combined statistical areas in the archipelago as defined by the United States Census Bureau. As of 2023, the estimated population of the San Juan–Bayamón–Caguas metropolitan area is 842,535 in municipalities in the conurbation and 1,193,198 in municipalities outside the urban core, making it the fourth largest in the insular Caribbean.

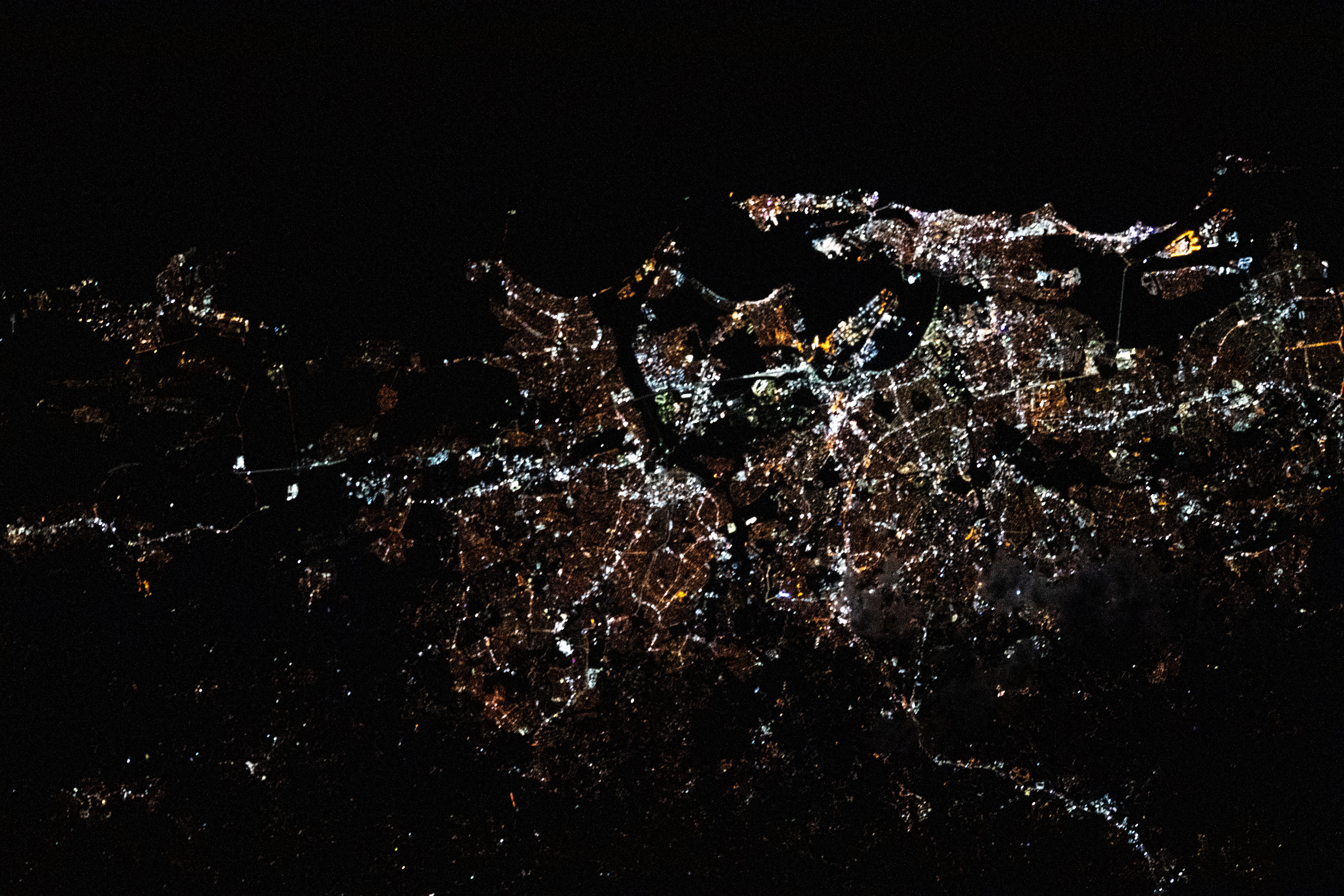
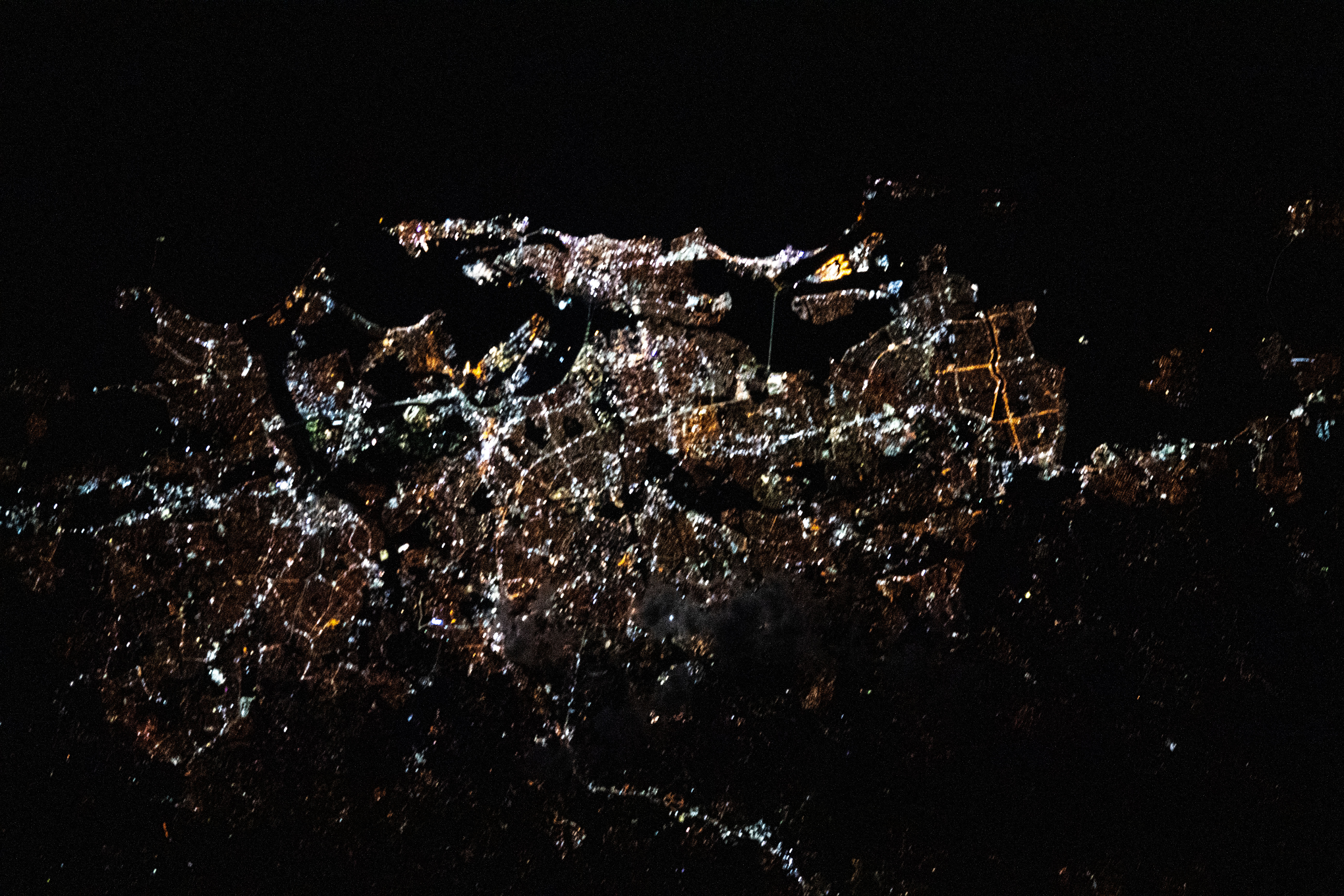
Conurbation or urban core of the San Juan–Bayamón–Caguas metropolitan area at night, 2020

== San Juan–Bayamón–Caguas metropolitan area ==
Consisting of 40 municipalities in the eastern half of the main island of Puerto Rico, the San Juan–Bayamón–Caguas metropolitan area covers 1,438 square miles (3,725 km^{2}) of land. With an estimated population of 842,535 in municipalities in the conurbation and 1,193,198 in municipalities outside the urban core, it is the largest and most populous statistical area in Puerto Rico. San Juan, Bayamón, Caguas, and Guaynabo are considered to be its principal cities. As of 2023, the San Juan–Bayamón–Caguas metropolitan area is the 36th most populated in the United States and territories, ranked between the Nashville-Davidson–Murfreesboro–Franklin, TN MSA and the San Jose–Sunnyvale–Santa Clara, CA MSA.

=== Conurbation ===
Timelapse (1984-2018) of conurbation of the San Juan–Bayamón–Caguas metropolitan area

Forming a continuous conurbation on the northeastern coastal plain of the main island of Puerto Rico, the San Juan metropolitan area (Spanish: área metropolitana de San Juan), also simply known as the área metro (metro area), is the urban core and greater area of the San Juan–Bayamón–Caguas metropolitan area (MSA). This highly urbanized, sprawling zone is concentrated in the capital municipality of San Juan, and the surrounding municipalities of Bayamón, Carolina, Guaynabo, Trujillo Alto, and Cataño. Occasionally, the suburb of Levittown in the municipality of Toa Baja is included within the urban core, which is also commonly referred to as the área metropolitana de Puerto Rico (Puerto Rico metropolitan area), as it is the primary urban region in the archipelago and island. However, along with Aguadilla, Arecibo, Guayama, Mayagüez, and Ponce, it is only one of six metropolitan areas in Puerto Rico.

==== Municipalities ====
- San Juan–Bayamón–Caguas metropolitan area (MSA)
  - Conurbation (6 municipalities)
    - San Juan Pop: 333,005
    - Bayamón Pop: 180,835
    - Carolina Pop: 150,843
    - Guaynabo Pop: 89,039
    - Trujillo Alto Pop: 66,705
    - Cataño Pop: 22,108

=== Outside urban core ===
The region outside the San Juan metropolitan area, the conurbation and greater area of the San Juan–Bayamón–Caguas metropolitan area (MSA), is made up of 34 municipalities, each containing small urban zones, of which the most populous is located in the principal city of Caguas on the Caguas Valley in eastern-central Puerto Rico. These urbanized, densely populated commercial and residential zones usually concentrate around the downtown area and administrative center of the municipality, which is categorized as a barrio and known as a pueblo.

==== Municipalities ====
- San Juan–Bayamón–Caguas metropolitan area (MSA)
  - Outside urban core (34 municipalities)
    - Caguas Pop: 124,608
    - Toa Baja Pop: 71,888
    - Toa Alta Pop: 65,957
    - Vega Baja Pop: 53,527
    - Humacao Pop: 49,712
    - Río Grande Pop: 45,568
    - Canóvanas Pop: 41,513
    - Cayey Pop: 40,525
    - Gurabo Pop: 39,971
    - Cidra Pop: 39,418
    - Manatí Pop: 38,665
    - San Lorenzo Pop: 37,264
    - Juncos Pop: 36,684
    - Dorado Pop: 35,702
    - Las Piedras Pop: 34,750
    - Vega Alta Pop: 34,638
    - Corozal Pop: 34,348
    - Fajardo Pop: 31,166
    - Naranjito Pop: 29,282
    - Barranquitas Pop: 29,020
    - Yabucoa Pop: 28,897
    - Morovis Pop: 28,197
    - Aibonito Pop: 24,602
    - Aguas Buenas Pop: 23,274
    - Naguabo Pop: 22,838
    - Barceloneta Pop: 22,376
    - Loíza Pop: 22,302
    - Orocovis Pop: 21,204
    - Comerío Pop: 18,601
    - Luquillo Pop: 17,386
    - Ciales Pop: 16,691
    - Florida Pop: 11,525
    - Ceiba Pop: 10,834
    - Maunabo Pop: 10,266

=== Topography ===
Topographic map of Puerto Rico

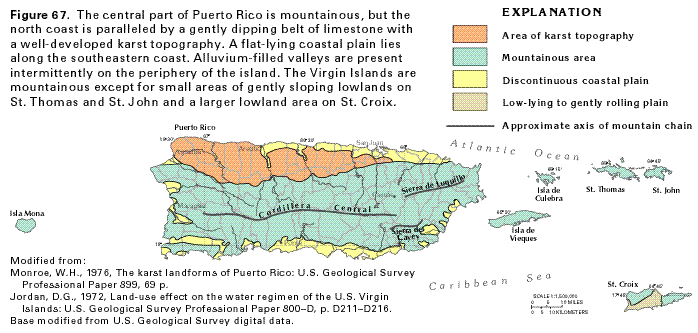
General physiographic map of Puerto Rico, with mountainous terrain in green, karst in orange, and plains in yellow

The San Juan–Bayamón–Caguas metropolitan area (MSA) varies in topography. While municipalities along the coastline have flat, low-lying terrain, most municipalities are located on elevated, hilly and mountainous terrain.

==== Conurbation ====
Comprising San Juan, Bayamón, Carolina, Guaynabo, Trujillo Alto, and Cataño, the conurbation or urban core of the San Juan metropolitan area is generally on the eastern part of the northern coastal plain of the main island of Puerto Rico. However, of the six municipalities within the urban area, only Cataño is completely situated on the coastal plain. In contrast, only the northern parts of San Juan, Bayamón, Carolina, Guaynabo, and Trujillo Alto are on the coastal plain, as the southern parts of Bayamón and Guayabo are on the hilly terrain of the Northern Karst Belt, and those of Carolina and Trujillo Alto are on the mountainous terrain of the Sierra de Luquillo. Less populated and restricted by rugged topography, these outer areas are mostly rural.

==== Outside urban core ====
Roughly covering the eastern half of the main island of Puerto Rico, the topography of the 34 municipalities outside the urban core of the San Juan metropolitan area varies between the eastern and southern coastal plains, the Caguas Valley, the Yabucoa Valley, the North Karst Belt, and the Cordillera Central, Sierra de Cayey, and Sierra de Luquillo mountain subranges.

- Outside urban core
  - Northern coastal plain and Northern Karst Belt
    - Barceloneta, Manatí, Vega Baja, Vega Alta, Corozal, Dorado, Toa Alta, and Toa Baja
  - Northern Karst Belt and Cordillera Central
    - Ciales, Morovis, and Naranjito
  - Northern Karst Belt
    - Florida
  - Cordillera Central
    - Orocovis, Barranquitas, Comerío, Aguas Buenas, and Cidra
  - Northern coastal plain and Sierra de Luquillo
    - Canóvanas, Loíza, Rio Grande, and Luquillo
  - Eastern coastal plain and Sierra de Luquillo
    - Fajardo, Ceiba, and Naguabo
  - Caguas Valley and Sierra de Luquillo
    - Gurabo, Juncos, and Las Piedras
  - Caguas Valley and eastern coastal plain
    - Humacao
  - Caguas Valley and Sierra de Cayey
    - Caguas and San Lorenzo
  - Sierra de Cayey
    - Aibonito and Cayey
  - Sierra de Cayey and southern coastal plain
    - Maunabo
  - Caguas Valley, Sierra de Cayey, and Yabucoa Valley
    - Yabucoa

Aside from an urbanized, densely populated downtown area and administrative center, categorized as a barrio and known as a pueblo, and concentrated urbanized residential areas with large populations, these municipalities are mostly rural, particularly those furtherest way, in distance and elevation, from the inner urban core around the capital, San Juan. Generally, low-lying areas along or near the shoreline in coastal municipalities, like those found in Vega Baja and Humacao, are greatly more urbanized and populated than inland, karstic, and mountainous areas, especially in elevated and interior municipalities like Orocovis, which is strictly rural and sparsely populated.

== San Juan–Bayamón combined area ==
The San Juan–Bayamón combined statistical area (CSA) comprises the metropolitan statistical areas (MSAs) of San Juan–Bayamón–Caguas, Arecibo, and Guayama, and the micropolitan statistical areas (μSAs) of Coco, Utuado, and Lares. It is the largest and most populous of three combined statistical areas in Puerto Rico.

=== Municipalities ===
The San Juan–Bayamón combined statistical area includes three metropolitan statistical areas (MSAs), three micropolitan statistical areas (μSAs), covering 50 of 78 municipalities in eastern and central of the main island of Puerto Rico.

In 2009, the San Juan–Bayamón combined statistical area comprised 68.9% of total population in Puerto Rico. The 2010 census placed the population at 2,728,791, a 4.16% increase over the 2000 census figure of 2,622,876. The 2020 census placed the population at 2,414,593, a 11.51% decrease over the 2010 census figure of 2,728,791.

With an estimated population of 2,360,082 as of 2023, the San Juan–Bayamón combined statistical area is the most populous CSA in Puerto Rico and the 32nd most populous CSA in the United States between the Raleigh–Durham–Cary, NC CSA and the Nashville-Davidson–Murfreesboro, TN CSA.

- Metropolitan Statistical Areas (MSAs)
  - San Juan–Bayamón–Caguas metropolitan statistical area (40 municipalities)
    - See municipalities above
  - Arecibo metropolitan statistical area (4 municipalities)
    - Arecibo Pop: 85,641
    - Hatillo Pop: 37,950
    - Camuy Pop: 32,625
    - Quebradillas Pop: 23,254
  - Guayama metropolitan statistical area (3 municipalities)
    - Guayama Pop: 34,765
    - Patillas Pop: 15,347
    - Arroyo Pop: 15,078
- Micropolitan statistical areas (μSAs)
  - Lares micropolitan statistical area (1 municipality)
    - Lares Pop: 27,729
  - Utuado micropolitan statistical area (1 municipality)
    - Utuado Pop: 27,242
  - Coco micropolitan statistical area (1 municipality)
    - Salinas Pop: 27,128

=== Topography ===
Comprising Arecibo, Hatillo, Camuy, and Quebradillas, the Arecibo metropolitan area is completely situated on the Northern Karst Belt in the northwestern region of the main island of Puerto Rico. The 3 municipalities in the Guayama metropolitan area–Patillas, Arroyo, and Guayama–are situated between the southern coastal plain and the Sierra de Cayey mountain subrange in the southeastern region of the main island. Both the Lares and Utuado micropolitan areas are situated between the Northern Karst Belt and the Cordillera Central mountain subrange in the western central region of the main island, while the Cocos micropolitan area of Salinas is situated between the southern coastal plain and the Sierra de Cayey mountain subrange in the southeastern region of the main island.

All municipalities have an urbanized, densely populated downtown area and administrative center, categorized as a barrio and known as a pueblo, and concentrated urbanized residential areas with large populations, which lie on low-lying regions along the coastline. The inland and mountainous parts of the municipalities are strictly rural and sparsely populated.

== Other statistical areas ==
In addition to the San Juan–Bayamón combined statistical area (CSA), Puerto Rico has two more combined statistical areas: the Mayagüez–Aguadilla CSA and the Ponce–Coamo CSA. The first is divided into two metropolitan statistical areas, the Mayagüez MSA and the Aguadilla MSA, while the second is divided into one metropolitan statistical area, the Ponce MSA, and one micropolitan statistical area, the Coamo μSA. These statistical areas cover 22 of 78 municipalities in Puerto Rico.

=== Municipalities ===
- Mayagüez–Aguadilla combined statistical area (CSA)
  - Aguadilla metropolitan statistical area (MSA) (7 municipalities)
    - Aguadilla Pop: 53,622
    - Isabela Pop: 42,794
    - San Sebastián Pop: 38,926
    - Aguada Pop: 37,528
    - Moca Pop: 37,325
    - Añasco Pop: 24,815
    - Rincón Pop: 15,425
  - Mayagüez metropolitan statistical area (MSA) (6 municipalities)
    - Mayagüez Pop: 69,798
    - Cabo Rojo Pop: 46,665
    - San Germán Pop: 30,996
    - Lajas Pop: 22,872
    - Sabana Grande Pop: 22,210
    - Hormigueros Pop: 15,336
- Ponce–Coamo combined statistical area (CSA)
  - Ponce metropolitan statistical area (MSA) (7 municipalities)
    - Ponce Pop: 130,251
    - Juana Díaz Pop: 45,919
    - Yauco Pop: 32,406
    - Villalba Pop: 21,285
    - Peñuelas Pop: 19,563
    - Adjuntas Pop: 17,900
    - Guayanilla Pop: 16,813
  - Coamo micropolitan statistical area (μSA) (2 municipalities)
    - Coamo Pop: 33,662
    - Santa Isabel Pop: 19,693

== No statistical area ==
As of 2023, there are 6 of 78 municipalities with less than 15,000 inhabitants that are not part of any statistical area in Puerto Rico.

- No statistical area
  - Six municipalities
    - Jayuya Pop: 14,435
    - Guánica Pop: 12,415
    - Las Marías Pop: 8,672
    - Vieques Pop: 7,999
    - Maricao Pop: 4,523
    - Culebra Pop: 1,761

== See also ==
- Puerto Rico census statistical areas
- List of Metropolitan Statistical Areas
