= Hato Nuevo =

Hato Nuevo may refer to:

- Hato Nuevo, Guaynabo, Puerto Rico, a barrio
- Hato Nuevo, Gurabo, Puerto Rico, a barrio
- Hatonuevo, a town and municipality in La Guajira Department, Colombia
