= List of barrios and sectors of Gurabo, Puerto Rico =

Like all municipalities of Puerto Rico, Gurabo is subdivided into administrative units called barrios, which are, in contemporary times, roughly comparable to minor civil divisions, (and means wards or boroughs or neighborhoods in English). The barrios and subbarrios, in turn, are further subdivided into smaller local populated place areas/units called sectores (sectors in English). The types of sectores may vary, from normally sector to urbanización to reparto to barriada to residencial, among others. Some sectors appear in two barrios.

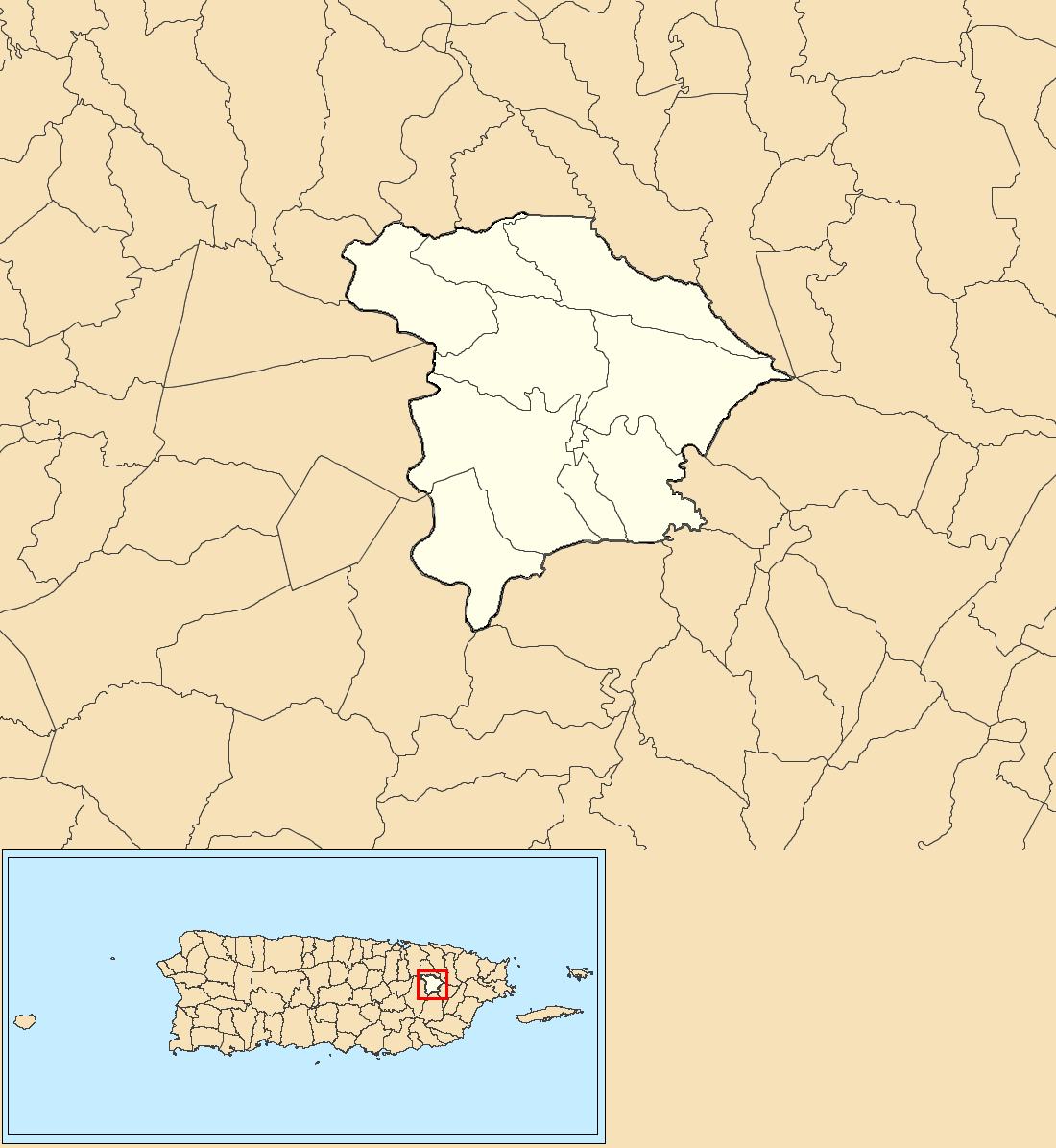
Gurabo map with barrio subdivisions

== List of sectors by barrio ==
=== Celada ===
- Alturas de Celada
- Apartamentos Villas del Soportal
- Parcelas Toquí
- Sector Casul (Carretera 181, km 22.6)
- Sector Celada Centro
- Sector El Abanico
- Sector El Colchón
- Sector El Trapiche
- Sector Eugenio Ruíz
- Sector Faro Gómez
- Sector Felo Reyes
- Sector Hernáiz
- Sector Juan Acevedo
- Sector La Tablita
- Sector La Tosca
- Sector Los Chinos Sur
- Sector Los Chinos
- Sector Los Meléndez
- Sector Los Pocholos
- Sector Los Toledo
- Sector Ortiz
- Sector Pepe Morales
- Sector Román
- Sector Rufo Ramírez
- Sector Toqui
- Sector Urrutia
- Sector Villa Joan
- Urbanización Heavenly View
- Urbanización Lomas del Sol

=== Gurabo barrio-pueblo ===
- Casco del Pueblo
- Barriada Nueva
- El Cerro
- Sector Vietnam
- Sector Rabo del Buey

=== Hato Nuevo ===
- Extensión Alturas de Hato Nuevo
- Los Rivera
- Los Sueños
- Parcelas Lomas Verdes
- Parcelas María Jiménez
- Parcelas Nuevas Celada
- Parcelas Viejas Celada
- Sector Álamo
- Sector Alicea
- Sector Cando Gómez
- Sector Cantera
- Sector Caraballo
- Sector Catalino Gómez
- Sector Concepción Ortiz
- Sector Estancia
- Sector Goytía
- Sector Josean Boria
- Sector Lomas Verdes
- Sector Los Cruces
- Sector Los Gómez
- Sector Los Márquez
- Sector Los Ortiz
- Sector Los Resto
- Sector Los Solares
- Sector María Jiménez
- Sector Montañez
- Sector Monte Moriah
- Sector Niño Díaz
- Sector Prudo Pérez
- Sector Querube
- Sector Sico Díaz
- Sector Valeriano Díaz (Camilo Díaz)
- Sector Valeriano Díaz
- Sector Valle Verde
- Sector Vázquez
- Sector Vidal Santos
- Terra Ciudad Jardín
- Urbanización Alturas de Hato Nuevo
- Urbanización Los Flamboyanes
- Urbanización Los Paisajes
- Urbanización Los Robles
- Urbanización Vistalago

=== Jaguar ===
- Sector Aguayo
- Sector Bezares
- Sector Carrasquillo
- Sector Los Benítez
- Sector Los Fonseca
- Sector Los García
- Sector Los Núñez
- Sector Maldonado
- Sector Mariera
- Sector Marina Rodríguez
- Sector Ocasio
- Sector Paquita Ramírez
- Sector Pérez
- Sector Rufo Avilés

=== Jaguas ===
- Hacienda Mirador
- Jaguas Lomas
- Quintas del Lago
- Sector Adorno
- Sector Arturo López
- Sector Cáceres
- Sector Calletano Sanchéz
- Sector Carazo
- Sector Carrasquillo
- Sector Colón Flores
- Sector Cosme
- Sector Negrón
- Sector Díaz
- Sector Felipe Ocasio
- Sector Felix Díaz
- Sector Guillermo Flores
- Sector Isidro Vázquez
- Sector Jaguas Llanos
- Sector Jaguas Peñón
- Sector Juan Guadalupe
- Sector La Agrícola
- Sector Las Casitas
- Sector Llinás
- Sector Los Colones
- Sector Los Oyola
- Sector Los Paganes
- Sector Los Quiñones
- Sector Los Vives
- Sector Márquez
- Sector Núñez
- Sector Ocasio
- Sector Oller
- Sector Olmedo
- Sector Oyola
- Sector Pagán
- Sector Pepe Díaz
- Sector Richard Rivera
- Sector Soto
- Sector Tino Torres
- Sector Urrutia
- Sector Viera Pérez
- Sector Vives
- Sector Zavala

=== Mamey ===
- Condominio Caminito
- Extensión San José
- Reparto San José
- Sector Bernabé Candelaria
- Sector Colinas de Gurabo
- Sector Cristóbal Casul
- Sector El Campito
- Sector Estancias de Monte Sol
- Sector Geño González
- Sector Juan López
- Sector La Lomita
- Sector Lucas Rivalta
- Sector Mamey 1
- Sector Mamey 2
- Sector Marina Rodríguez
- Sector Opio
- Sector Pablo Hernández
- Sector Padilla
- Sector Rodríguez Fortis
- Sector Rufo Avilés
- Sector Tomás Rodríguez
- Urbanización Ciudad Jardín
- Urbanización El Paraíso
- Urbanización Jardines de Gurabo
- Urbanización Llanos de Gurabo
- Urbanización Los Altos
- Urbanización Parque Las Américas
- Urbanización Valle del Tesoro
- Urbanización Valles de Ensueño

=== Masa ===
- Camino Santos Garcia
- Parcelas Viejas Ramón T. Colón
- Reverendo Pedro Parrilla
- Sector Buenos Aires
- Sector Eugenio Ruiz
- Sector Goyo Márquez
- Sector Julio Boria
- Sector Lomas del Viento
- Sector Los Rivero
- Sector Los Viera
- Sector Masa I
- Sector Masa II
- Sector Miranda
- Sector Peyo Alemán
- Sector Resto
- Sector Santana

=== Navarro ===
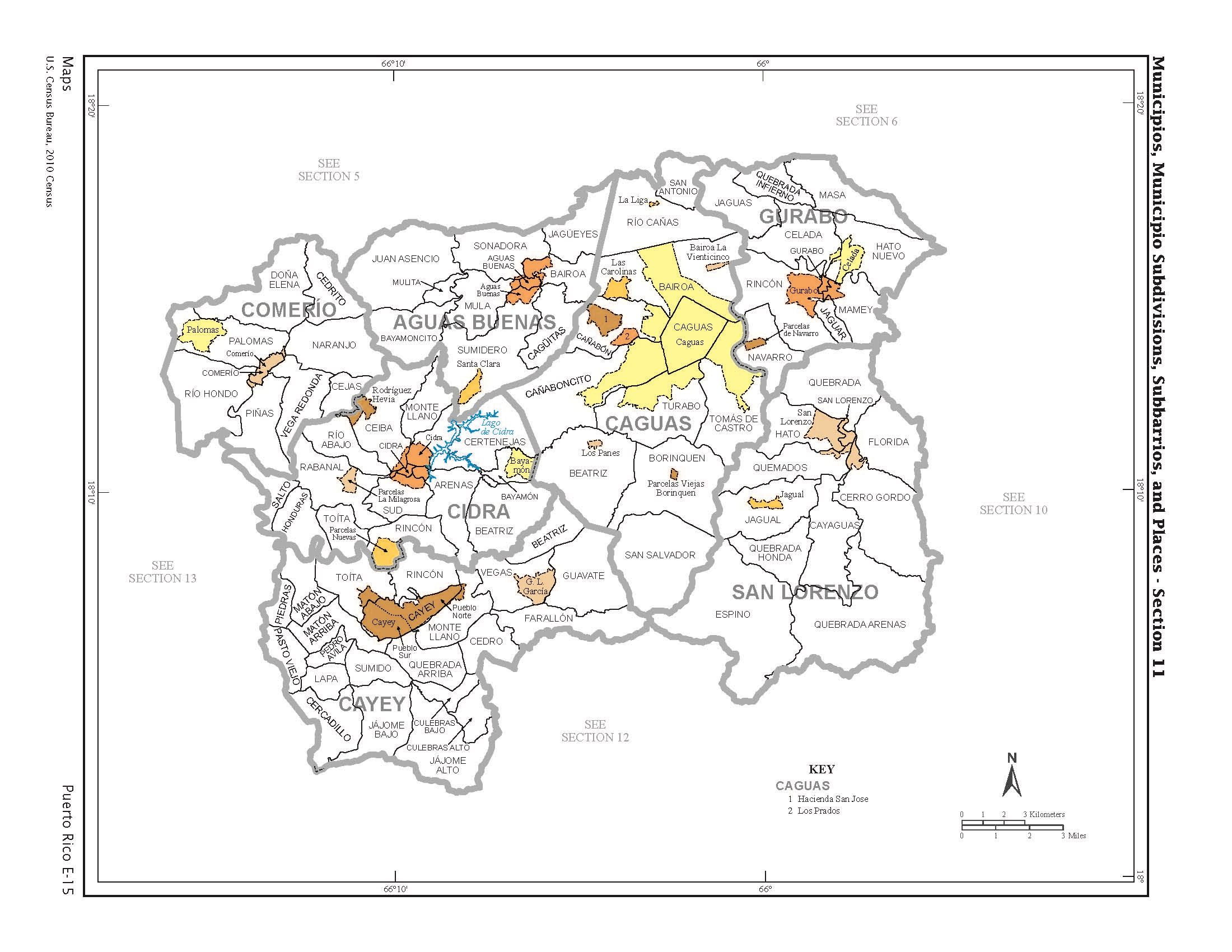
US 2010 Census map showing barrios and places in Gurabo and neighboring municipios

- Alturas de Santa Bárbara
- Apartamentos Maga Tree Village
- Apartamentos Las Vistas de Gurabo
- Apartamentos Paseo Gran Vista
- College High
- Condominio El Alcázar
- Condominio Paseo Gales
- Condominio Ventanas de Gurabo
- Parcelas de Navarro
- Reina de los Ángeles
- Sector Bruceles
- Sector Carlos Rivera
- Sector Cielito
- Sector Los Flamboyanes
- Sector Los Flores
- Sector Los Pinos
- Sector Los Solares
- Sector Mano Manca
- Sector Pachanga
- Sector Quebrada
- Sector Santa Bárbara
- Urbanización Alta Paz
- Urbanización Campiñas de Navarro
- Urbanización Colinas de Navarro
- Urbanización College Hills
- Urbanización El Convento
- Urbanización Estancias de Gran Vista
- Urbanización Estancias de Monte Verde
- Urbanización Estancias de Santa Bárbara
- Urbanización Gran Vista I
- Urbanización Gran Vista II
- Urbanización Horizontes
- Urbanización Las Lilas
- Urbanización Mansiones de Navarro
- Urbanización Mansiones de Santa Bárbara
- Urbanización Monte Alto
- Urbanización Monte Brisas
- Urbanización Monte Subasio
- Urbanización Paraíso de Santa Bárbara
- Urbanización Paseos de Santa Bárbara
- Urbanización Praderas de Navarro
- Urbanización Preciosa
- Urbanización Sabanera del Río
- Urbanización Santa Bárbara
- Urbanización Valle Santa Bárbara
- Urbanización Ventanas Al Valle
- Urbanización Vereda
- Valle Borikén

=== Quebrada Infierno ===
- Los Corcino
- Sector Aponte
- Sector Brígido Adorno
- Sector Delgado
- Sector Díaz Ayala
- Sector Díaz Rodríguez
- Sector El Silencio
- Sector La Agrícola
- Sector Lomas del Viento
- Sector Los Arroyo
- Sector Los Mudos
- Sector Los Pinos
- Sector Medina
- Sector Santa Rita
- Sector Tulo Alemán
- Sector Villanueva

=== Rincón ===
- Barriada Las Flores
- Buena Vista Apartments
- Condominio Villas del Este (Modena 1, 2, 3)
- Égida Gurabo Elderly Housing
- Reparto San José
- Residencial Luis del Carmen Echevarría
- Sector Agosto
- Sector Bella Vista
- Sector Cabezudo
- Sector Castro
- Sector Cayano
- Sector Gómez
- Sector Jalisco
- Sector La Finca
- Sector Leal
- Sector Los Calderón
- Sector Los Cuadrado
- Sector Los Rodríguez
- Sector Matanzo
- Sector Matías Jiménez
- Sector Pello Cruz
- Sector Perdomo
- Sector Pérez
- Sector Piro Cruz
- Sector Sánchez Cabezudo
- Sector Sánchez
- Urbanización Campamento
- Urbanización El Vivero
- Urbanización Los Maestros
- Urbanización O'Reilly
- Urbanización Senderos de Gurabo
- Urbanización Toscana
- Urbanización Villa Alegre
- Urbanización Villa del Carmen
- Urbanización Villa Marina I
- Urbanización Villa Marina II
- Urbanización Villas de Gurabo
- Urbanización Villas de Gurabo II

== See also ==
- List of communities in Puerto Rico
