= Quebrada Infierno, Gurabo, Puerto Rico =

Barrio of Puerto Rico

Quebrada Infierno
- Barrio
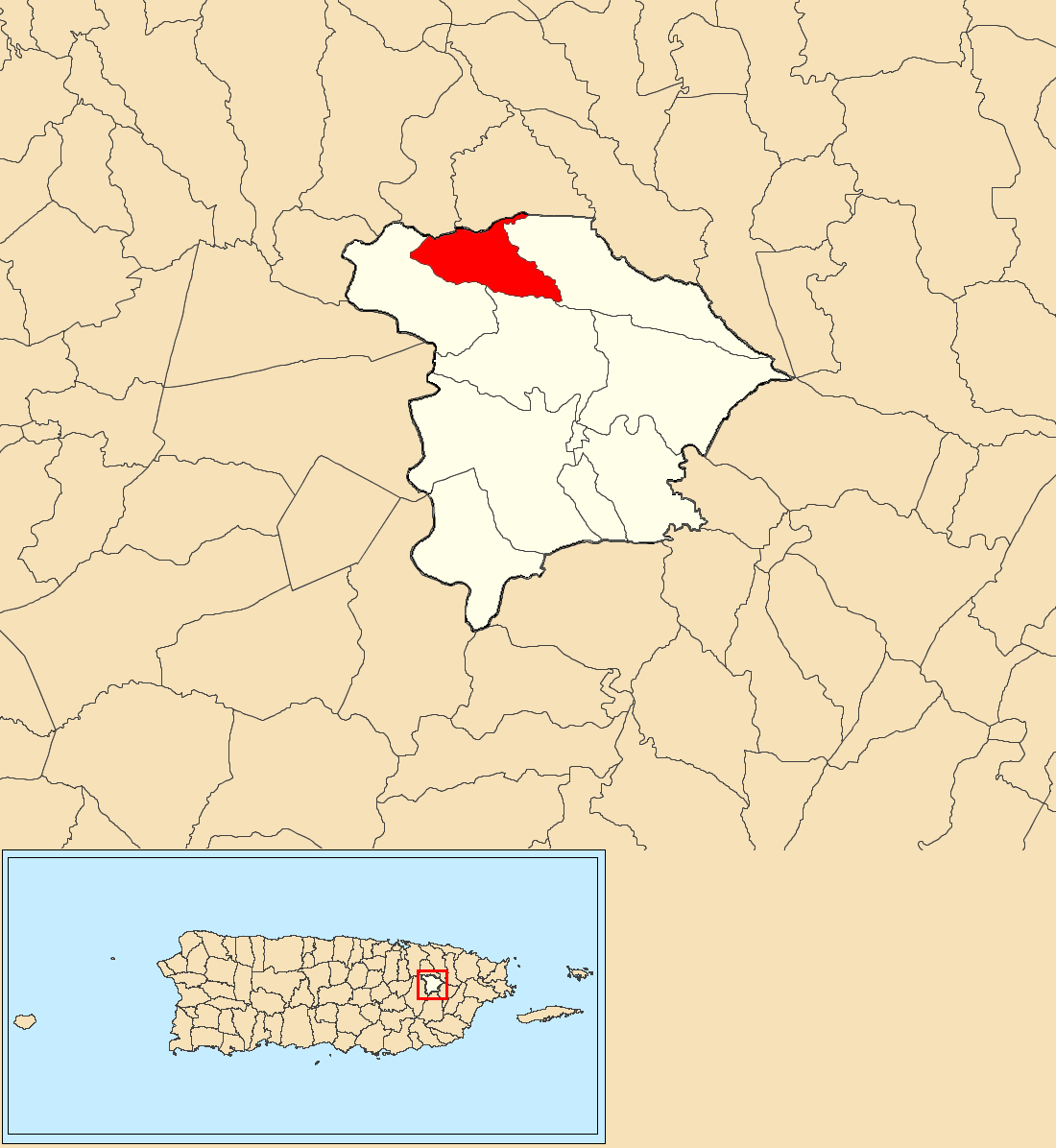
- Location of Quebrada Infierno within the municipality of Gurabo shown in red

- Location of Puerto Rico
- Coordinates: 18°17′56″N 65°59′42″W
- Commonwealth: Puerto Rico
- Municipality: Gurabo

Area
  - Total: 1.75 sq mi (4.5 km^{2})
  - Land: 1.75 sq mi (4.5 km^{2})
  - Water: 0 sq mi (0 km^{2})
- Elevation: 551 ft (168 m)

Population (2010)
  - Total: 773
  - Density: 441.7/sq mi (170.5/km^{2})
- Source: 2010 Census
- Time zone: UTC−4 (AST)
- ZIP Code: 00778

Quebrada Infierno is a barrio in the municipality of Gurabo, Puerto Rico. Its population in 2010 was 773.

== History ==
Quebrada Infierno was in Spain's gazetteers until Puerto Rico was ceded by Spain in the aftermath of the Spanish–American War under the terms of the Treaty of Paris of 1898 and became an unincorporated territory of the United States. In 1899, the United States Department of War conducted a census of Puerto Rico finding that the combined population of Quebrada Infierno and Navarro barrios was 1,093.

Historical population
Census	Pop.	Note	%±
1910	629		—
1920	735		16.9%
1930	741		0.8%
1940	975		31.6%
1950	673		−31.0%
1960	524		−22.1%
1970	458		−12.6%
1980	719		57.0%
1990	835		16.1%
2000	675		−19.2%
2010	773		14.5%
U.S. Decennial Census; 1900 (N/A) 1910-1930; 1930-1950 1980-2000 2010

== Sectors ==
Barrios (which are, in contemporary times, roughly comparable to minor civil divisions) in turn are further subdivided into smaller local populated place areas/units called sectores (sectors in English). The types of sectores may vary, from normally sector to urbanización to reparto to barriada to residencial, among others.

The following sectors are in Quebrada Infierno barrio:

Los Corcino, Sector Aponte, Sector Brígido Adorno, Sector Delgado, Sector Díaz Ayala, Sector Díaz Rodríguez, Sector El Silencio, Sector La Agrícola, Sector Lomas del Viento, Sector Los Arroyo, Sector Los Mudos, Sector Los Pinos, Sector Medina, Sector Santa Rita, Sector Tulo Alemán, and Sector Villanueva.

== See also ==
- List of communities in Puerto Rico
- List of barrios and sectors of Gurabo, Puerto Rico
