= Masa, Gurabo, Puerto Rico =

Barrio of Puerto Rico

Masa
- Barrio
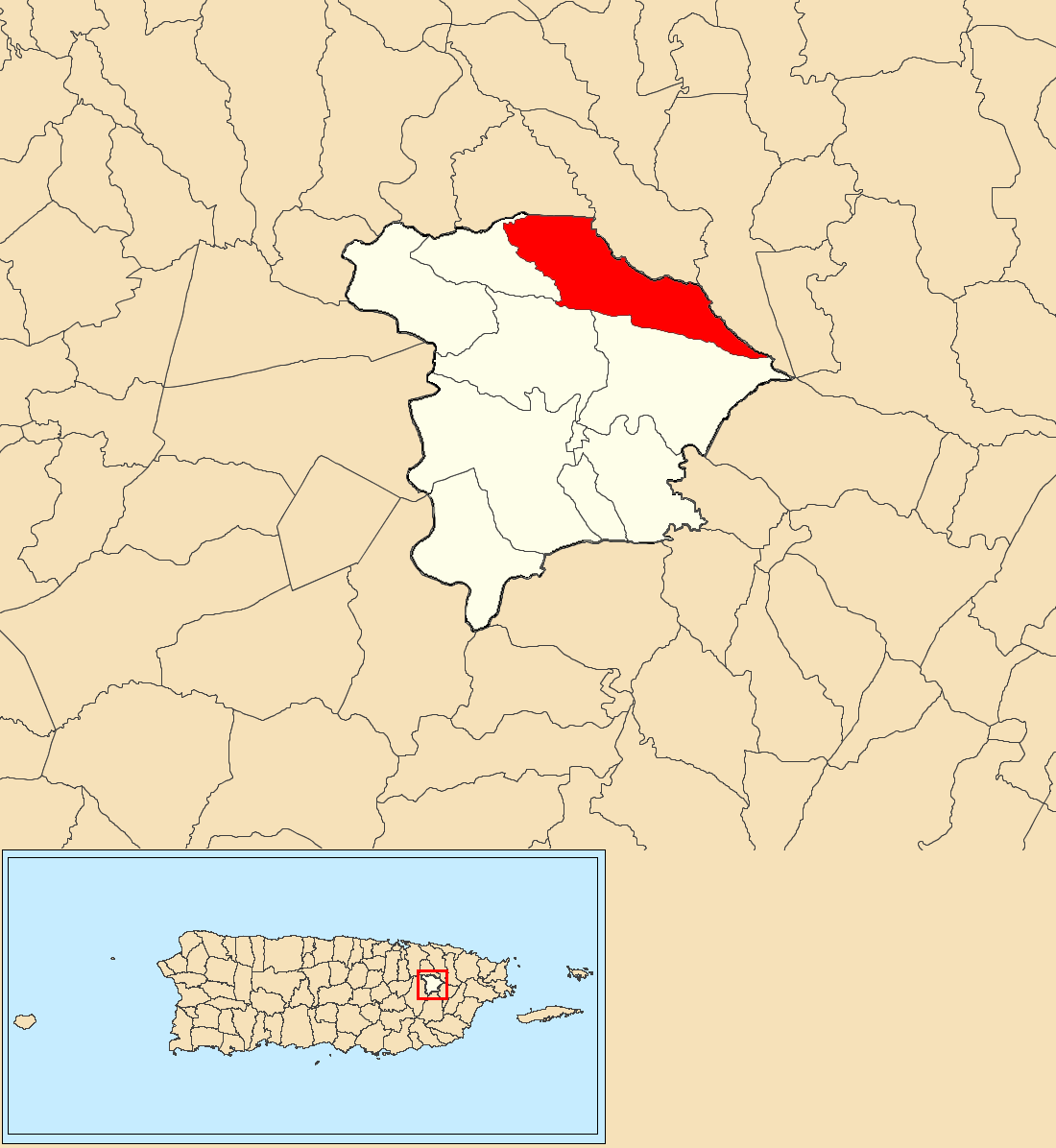
- Location of Masa within the municipality of Gurabo shown in red

- Location of Puerto Rico
- Coordinates: 18°17′37″N 65°57′44″W
- Commonwealth: Puerto Rico
- Municipality: Gurabo

Area
  - Total: 3.74 sq mi (9.7 km^{2})
  - Land: 3.74 sq mi (9.7 km^{2})
  - Water: 0 sq mi (0 km^{2})
- Elevation: 712 ft (217 m)

Population (2010)
  - Total: 1,522
  - Density: 407/sq mi (157/km^{2})
- Source: 2010 Census
- Time zone: UTC−4 (AST)
- ZIP Code: 00778

Masa is a barrio in the municipality of Gurabo, Puerto Rico. Its population in 2010 was 1,522.

== History ==
Masa was in Spain's gazetteers until Puerto Rico was ceded by Spain in the aftermath of the Spanish–American War under the terms of the Treaty of Paris of 1898 and became an unincorporated territory of the United States. In 1899, the United States Department of War conducted a census of Puerto Rico finding that the combined population of Masa and Jaguar barrios was 1,270.

Historical population
Census	Pop.	Note	%±
1910	928		—
1920	880		−5.2%
1930	938		6.6%
1940	950		1.3%
1950	991		4.3%
1960	871		−12.1%
1970	802		−7.9%
1980	1,142		42.4%
1990	1,500		31.3%
2000	1,677		11.8%
2010	1,522		−9.2%
U.S. Decennial Census; 1900 (N/A) 1910-1930; 1930-1950 1980-2000 2010

== Sectors ==
Barrios (which are, in contemporary times, roughly comparable to minor civil divisions) in turn are further subdivided into smaller local populated place areas/units called sectores (sectors in English). The types of sectores may vary, from normally sector to urbanización to reparto to barriada to residencial, among others.

The following sectors are in Masa barrio:

Camino Santos Garcia, Parcelas Viejas Ramón T. Colón, Reverendo Pedro Parrilla, Sector Buenos Aires, Sector Eugenio Ruiz, Sector Goyo Márquez, Sector Julio Boria, Sector Lomas del Viento, Sector Los Rivero, Sector Los Viera, Sector Masa I, Sector Masa II, Sector Miranda, Sector Peyo Alemán, Sector Resto, and Sector Santana.

== See also ==
- List of communities in Puerto Rico
- List of barrios and sectors of Gurabo, Puerto Rico
