= Gurabo River =

River of Puerto Rico

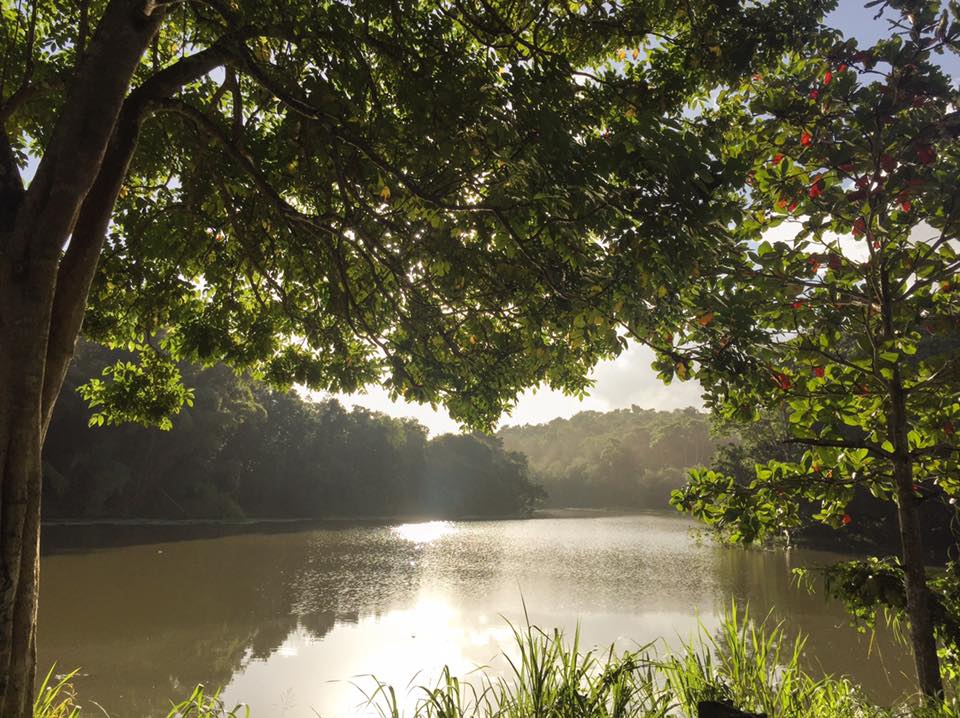
- Mouth of the Gurabo River as it flows into the Loíza River in Gurabo, as seen from Caguas.
- Native name: Río Gurabo (Spanish)

Location
- Commonwealth: Puerto Rico
- Municipality: Gurabo, Juncos, Las Piedras

Physical characteristics
- Source
  - location: El Río, Las Piedras
  - coordinates: 18.2716200°N 66.0082205°W
- Mouth
  - location: Loíza River in Jaguas, Gurabo

The Gurabo River (Spanish: Río Gurabo) is a river and tributary of the Loíza River in Puerto Rico. In 2018, the U.S. Army Corps of Engineers announced work would be done on the river, which runs through several municipalities including Gurabo, Juncos, and Las Piedras.

In 2018, homes in Juncos were on the verge of collapse as a result of erosion and landslides caused by a change in the rivers trajectory.

== Gallery ==
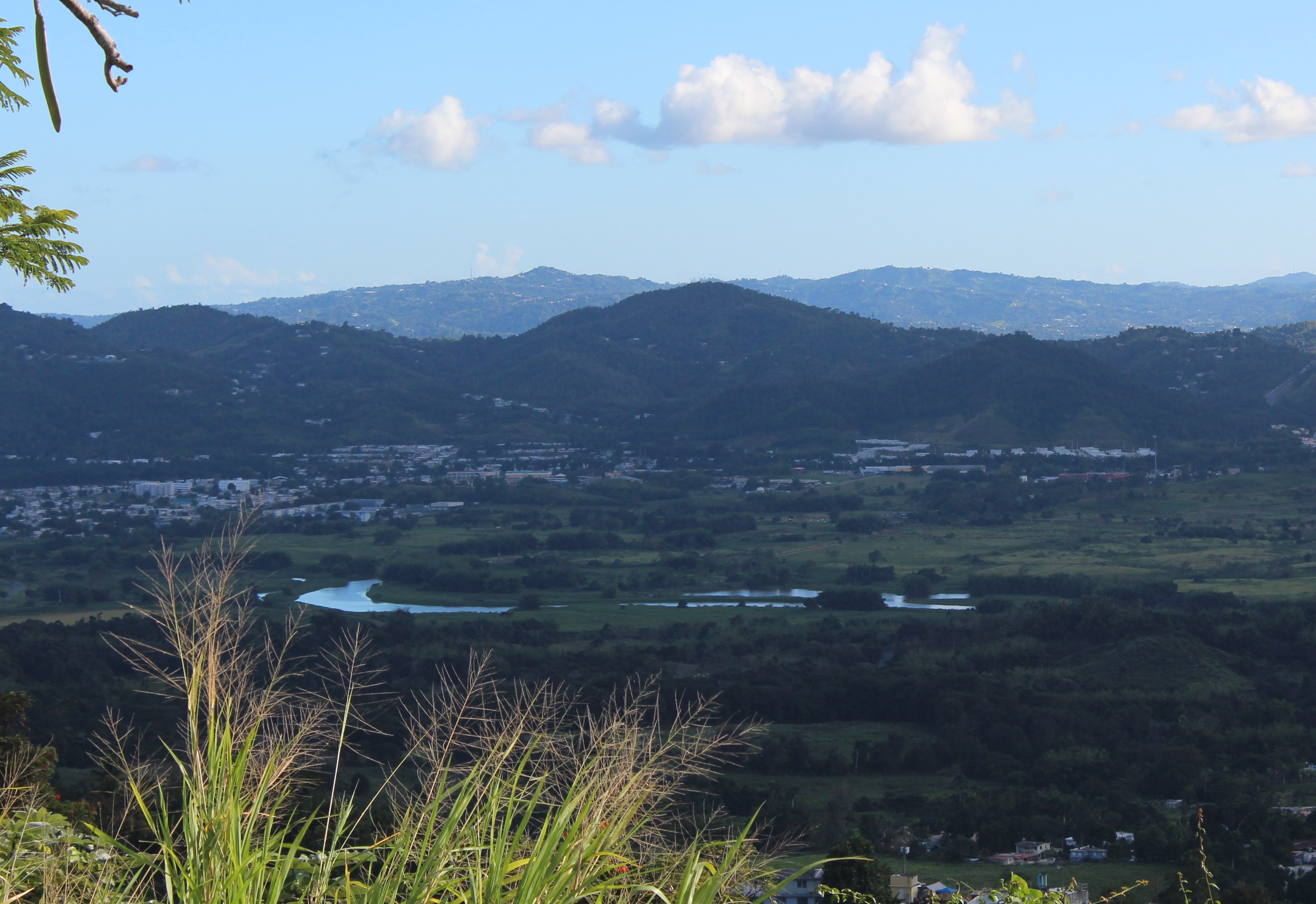
View of Gurabo River

== See also ==
- List of rivers of Puerto Rico
