= Mamey, Gurabo, Puerto Rico =

Barrio of Puerto Rico

Mamey
- Barrio
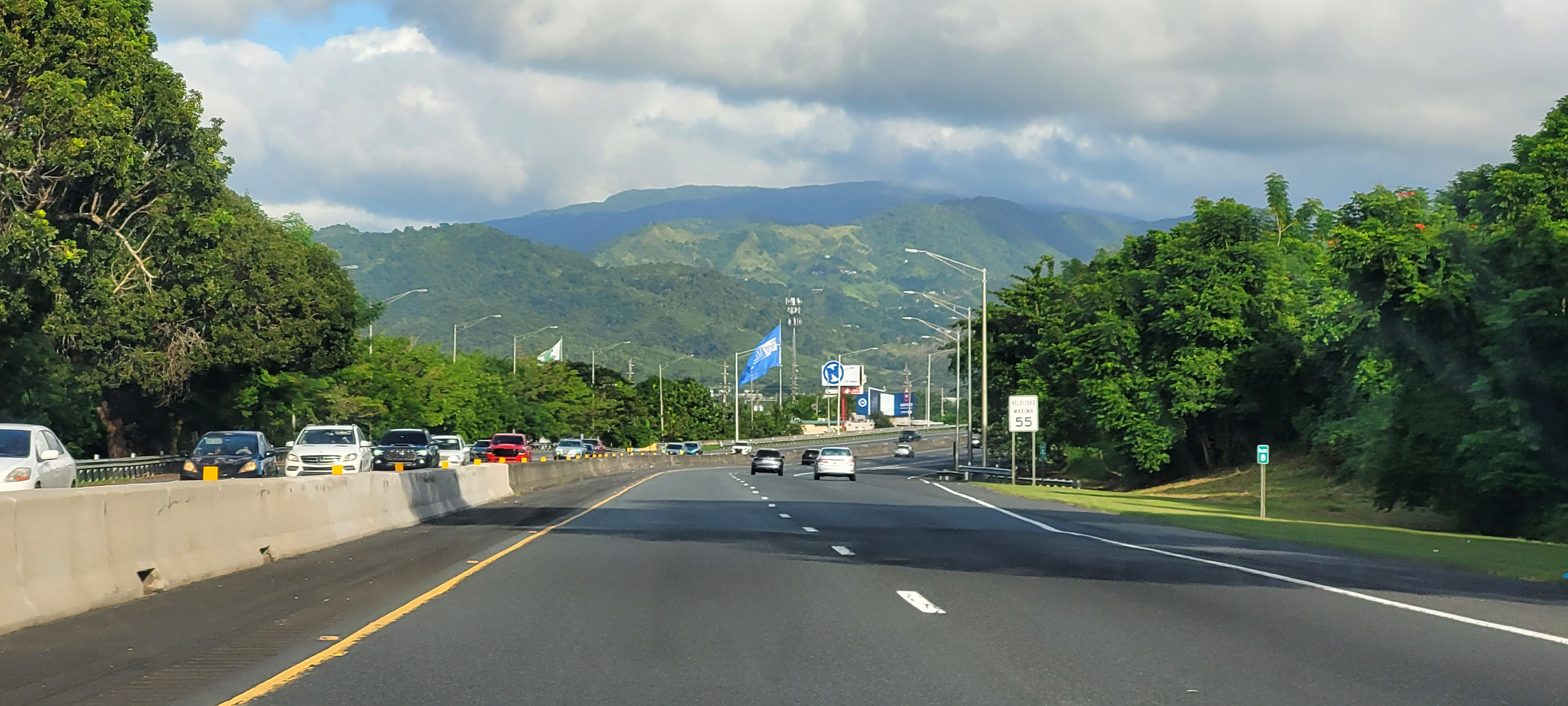
- Puerto Rico Highway 30 in Mamey

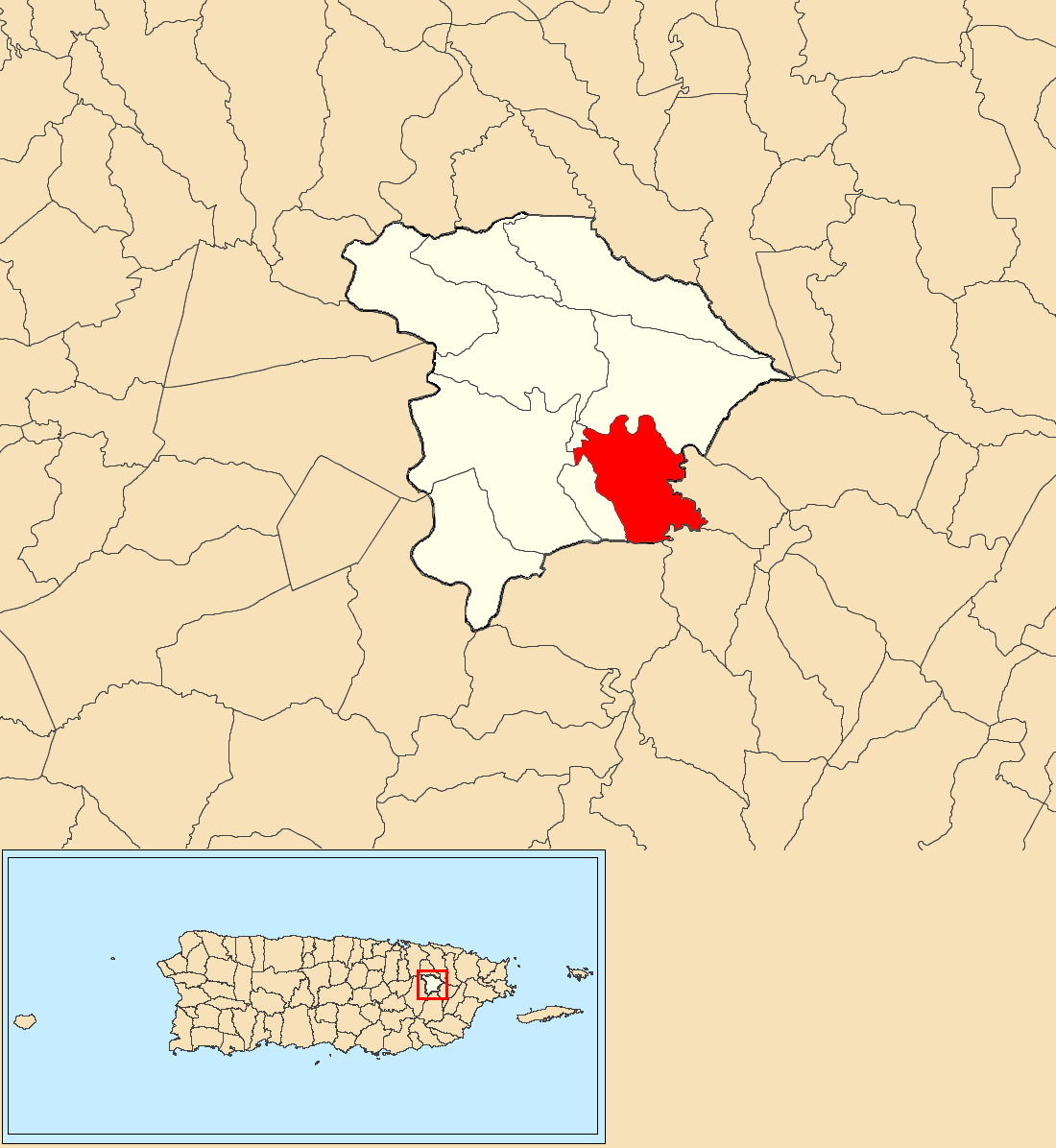
- Location of Mamey within the municipality of Gurabo shown in red

- Location of Puerto Rico
- Coordinates: 18°14′38″N 65°57′17″W
- Commonwealth: Puerto Rico
- Municipality: Gurabo

Area
  - Total: 2.63 sq mi (6.8 km^{2})
  - Land: 2.62 sq mi (6.8 km^{2})
  - Water: 0.01 sq mi (0.026 km^{2})
- Elevation: 344 ft (105 m)

Population (2010)
  - Total: 4,714
  - Density: 1,799.2/sq mi (694.7/km^{2})
- Source: 2010 Census
- Time zone: UTC−4 (AST)
- ZIP Code: 00778

Mamey is a barrio in the municipality of Gurabo, Puerto Rico. Its population in 2010 was 4,714.

== History ==
Mamey was in Spain's gazetteers until Puerto Rico was ceded by Spain in the aftermath of the Spanish–American War under the terms of the Treaty of Paris of 1898 and became an unincorporated territory of the United States. In 1899, the United States Department of War conducted a census of Puerto Rico finding that the population of Mamey barrio was 680.

Historical population
Census	Pop.	Note	%±
1900	680		—
1910	728		7.1%
1920	1,015		39.4%
1930	1,224		20.6%
1940	1,249		2.0%
1950	1,343		7.5%
1960	1,233		−8.2%
1970	0		−100.0%
1980	1,878		—
1990	3,169		68.7%
2000	4,203		32.6%
2010	4,714		12.2%
U.S. Decennial Census; 1899 (shown as 1900) 1910-1930; 1930-1950 1980-2000 2010

== Sectors ==
Barrios (which are, in contemporary times, roughly comparable to minor civil divisions) in turn are further subdivided into smaller local populated place areas/units called sectores (sectors in English). The types of sectores may vary, from normally sector to urbanización to reparto to barriada to residencial, among others.

The following sectors are in Mamey barrio:

Condominio Caminito, Extensión San José, Reparto San José, Sector Bernabé Candelaria, Sector Colinas de Gurabo, Sector Cristóbal Casul, Sector El Campito, Sector Estancias de Monte Sol, Sector Geño González, Sector Juan López, Sector La Lomita, Sector Lucas Rivalta, Sector Mamey 1, Sector Mamey 2, Sector Marina Rodríguez, Sector Opio, Sector Pablo Hernández, Sector Padilla, Sector Rodríguez Fortis, Sector Rufo Avilés, Sector Tomás Rodríguez, Urbanización Ciudad Jardín, Urbanización El Paraíso, Urbanización Jardines de Gurabo, Urbanización Llanos de Gurabo, Urbanización Los Altos, Urbanización Parque Las Américas, Urbanización Valle del Tesoro, and Urbanización Valles de Ensueño.

== See also ==
- List of communities in Puerto Rico
- List of barrios and sectors of Gurabo, Puerto Rico
