= Gurabo, Puerto Rico =

Town and municipality in Puerto Rico

Gurabo Municipio de Gurabo
- Town and municipality
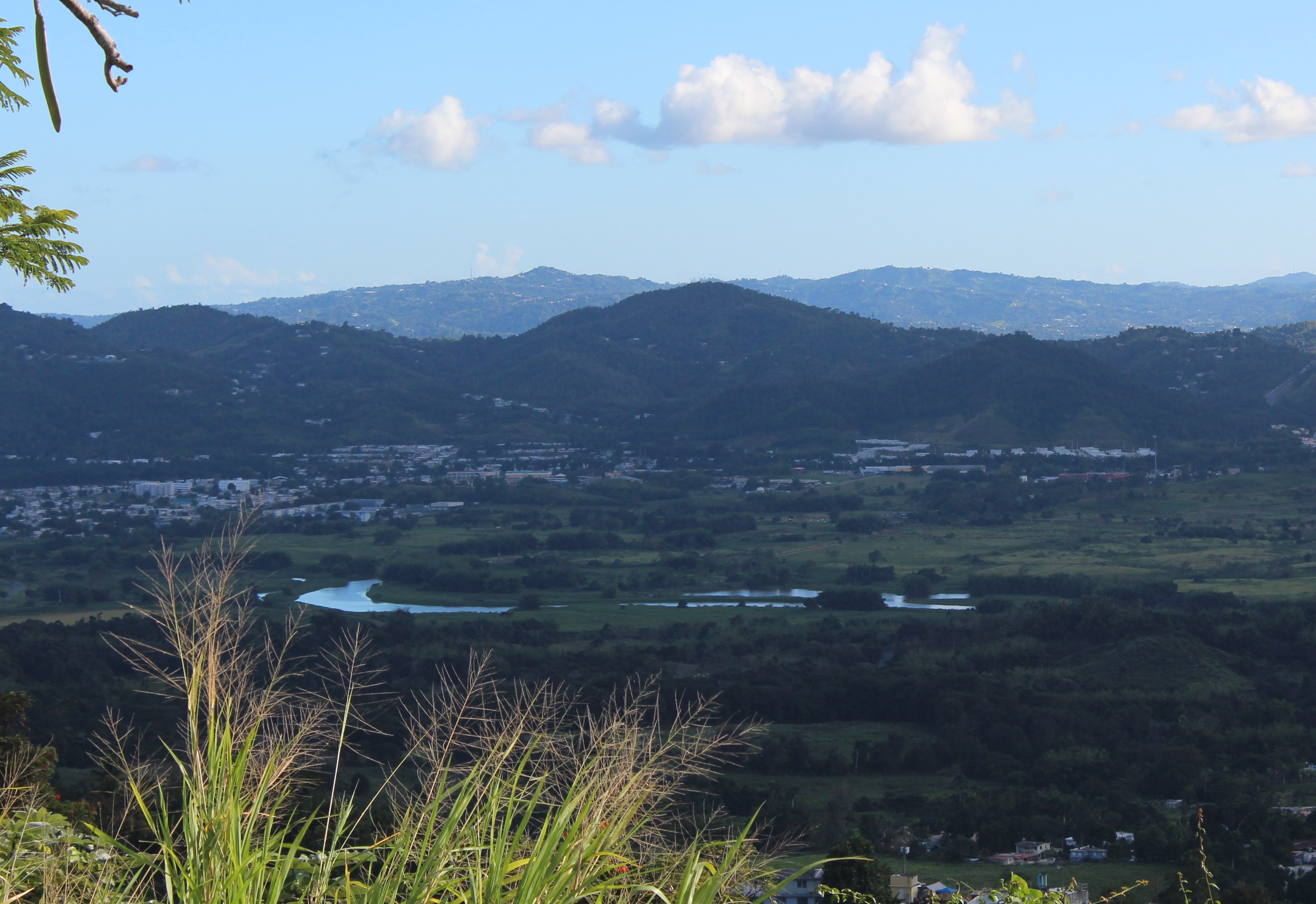
- Gurabo River and valley from Jaguas

- Flag Coat of arms
- Nicknames: El Pueblo de las Escaleras", "Puerta del Turismo del Sureste
- Anthem: "En un valle rodeado por montañas nace un"
- Map of Puerto Rico highlighting Gurabo Municipality
- Coordinates: 18°15′16″N 65°58′23″W
- Sovereign state: United States
- Commonwealth: Puerto Rico
- Settled: 1700
- Founded: November 27, 1815
- Founder: Luis del Carmen Echevarría
- Barrios: 10 barrios: Celada; Gurabo barrio-pueblo; Hato Nuevo; Jaguar; Jaguas; Mamey; Masa; Navarro; Quebrada Infierno; Rincón

Government
  - Mayor: Glenda Villafañe (acting) (NPP)
  - Senatorial dist.: 7 - Humacao
  - Representative dist.: 31,32

Area
  - Total: 28.28 sq mi (73.24 km^{2})
  - Land: 27.84 sq mi (72.11 km^{2})
  - Water: 0.44 sq mi (1.13 km^{2})

Population (2020)
  - Total: 40,622
  - Estimate (2025): 39,780 ▼
  - Rank: 21st in Puerto Rico
  - Density: 1,459/sq mi (563.3/km^{2})
- Demonym: Gurabeños
- Time zone: UTC-4 (AST)
- ZIP Code: 00778
- Area code: 787/939
- Website: gurabopr.com

Gurabo (Spanish pronunciation: [ɡuˈɾaβo]) is a town and municipality in eastern Puerto Rico. It is located in the central eastern region, north of San Lorenzo; south of Trujillo Alto; east of Caguas; and west of Carolina and Juncos. Gurabo is spread over 9 barrios and Gurabo Pueblo (the downtown area and the administrative center of the city). It is part of the San Juan-Caguas-Guaynabo Metropolitan Statistical Area.

== History ==
Gurabo's history dates as far back as the 17th century, when it was actually part of Caguas. Then, the area was known as Burabo. By 1700, transportation, medical and economic troubles were crippling the population of the Burabo area; traveling to Caguas' center for business and medical help was not easy and took hours. This led many of Burabo's citizens to seek autonomy for the area.

It would be long, however, before Gurabo was separated from Caguas. The separation movement was brought forward by an 1812 meeting of all 168 family leaders in Gurabo, who decided to have Luis del Carmen Echevarría lead them in their quest for independence, based on the large number of residents in Burabo.

In 1815, Gurabo became a municipality. In 1822, the first Catholic church in town was erected. In 1903, the first Baptist church opened its doors in Gurabo town.

Gurabo is also known as "La Ciudad de las Escaleras", or the "City of Stairs". Located in the town center district of El Cerro, the stairs (step streets) are about twenty-two floors high, and they are painted in bright colors.

Gurabo's mayor is Rosachely Rivera Santana.

The significant amount of rainfall from Hurricane Maria triggered numerous landslides in Gurabo on September 20, 2017. Many people had to be rescued from floods and 489 homes were destroyed.

== Geography ==
Gurabo is located on the east side of Puerto Rico in the Caguas Valley. The highest point in the municipality is the Cuchilla de Hato Nuevo (1,594.1 feet / 486 m).

=== Bodies of water ===
Located in Gurabo are a number of rivers, streams, and unnamed creeks. The main river to cross the municipality is the Gurabo and a portion of the Loíza River runs through Gurabo. In 2018, the U.S. Army Corps of Engineers announced work would be done on Gurabo River.

=== Barrios ===
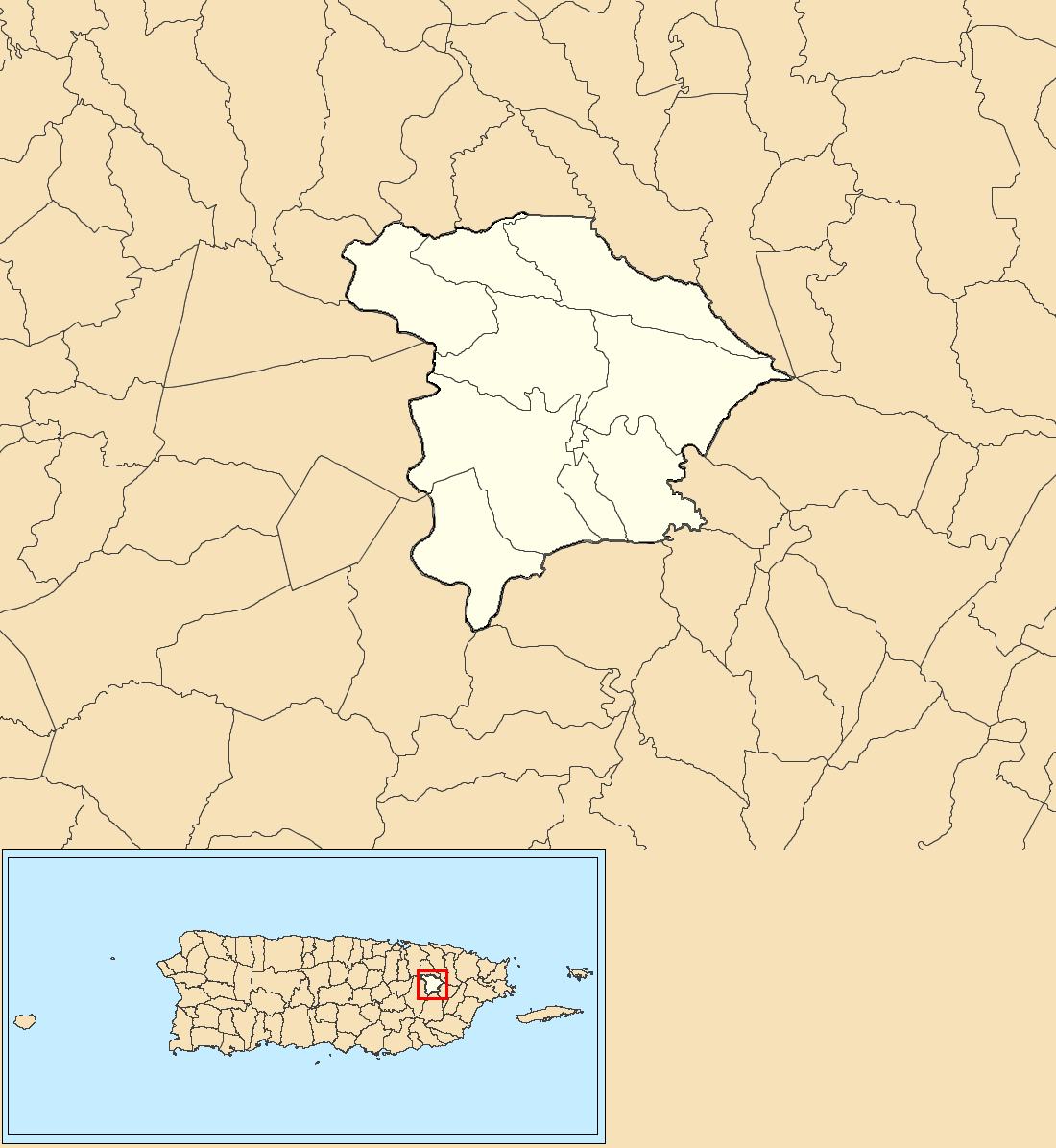
Gurabo map with barrio subdivisions

Like all municipalities of Puerto Rico, Gurabo is subdivided into barrios. The municipal buildings, central square and large Catholic church are located in a small barrio referred to as "el pueblo", located near the center of the municipality.

1. Celada
2. Gurabo barrio-pueblo
3. Hato Nuevo
4. Jaguar
5. Jaguas
6. Mamey
7. Masa
8. Navarro
9. Quebrada Infierno
10. Rincón

=== Sectors ===
Barrios (which are, in contemporary times, roughly comparable to minor civil divisions) are further subdivided into smaller areas called sectores (sectors in English). The types of sectores may vary, from normally sector to urbanización to reparto to barriada to residencial, among others.

=== Special Communities ===
Comunidades Especiales de Puerto Rico (Special Communities of Puerto Rico) are marginalized communities whose citizens are experiencing a certain amount of social exclusion. A map shows these communities occur in nearly every municipality of the commonwealth. Of the 742 places that were on the list in 2014, the following barrios, communities, sectors, or neighborhoods were in Gurabo: El Cerro, Estancias de Hato Nuevo, and Villa Alegre.

=== Climate ===
Climate data for Gurabo, Puerto Rico (1991–2020 normals, extremes 1956–present)
Month	Jan	Feb	Mar	Apr	May	Jun	Jul	Aug	Sep	Oct	Nov	Dec	Year
Record high °F (°C)	97 (36)	93 (34)	99 (37)	99 (37)	97 (36)	96 (36)	97 (36)	97 (36)	103 (39)	96 (36)	98 (37)	96 (36)	103 (39)
Mean daily maximum °F (°C)	84.5 (29.2)	84.7 (29.3)	86.3 (30.2)	87.5 (30.8)	88.8 (31.6)	90.1 (32.3)	90.2 (32.3)	90.8 (32.7)	90.4 (32.4)	89.5 (31.9)	87.6 (30.9)	85.3 (29.6)	88.0 (31.1)
Daily mean °F (°C)	73.2 (22.9)	73.1 (22.8)	74.4 (23.6)	76.5 (24.7)	78.9 (26.1)	80.2 (26.8)	80.0 (26.7)	80.7 (27.1)	80.2 (26.8)	79.4 (26.3)	77.3 (25.2)	74.8 (23.8)	77.4 (25.2)
Mean daily minimum °F (°C)	61.8 (16.6)	61.4 (16.3)	62.6 (17.0)	65.5 (18.6)	69.0 (20.6)	70.4 (21.3)	69.8 (21.0)	70.6 (21.4)	70.1 (21.2)	69.2 (20.7)	67.0 (19.4)	64.3 (17.9)	66.8 (19.3)
Record low °F (°C)	43 (6)	42 (6)	43 (6)	51 (11)	50 (10)	55 (13)	54 (12)	54 (12)	58 (14)	55 (13)	53 (12)	50 (10)	42 (6)
Average precipitation inches (mm)	3.72 (94)	2.64 (67)	3.88 (99)	4.21 (107)	5.38 (137)	3.83 (97)	5.93 (151)	8.22 (209)	8.72 (221)	6.95 (177)	6.98 (177)	4.31 (109)	64.77 (1,645)
Average precipitation days (≥ 0.01 in)	20.3	17.1	14.1	15.1	17.5	16.5	17.3	18.6	18.6	18.2	20.9	20.5	214.7
Source: NOAA

== Economy ==
=== Agriculture ===
- Dairy farms

=== Industry ===
Manufacturing (metal, paper, plastics, chemicals, pharmaceuticals, textiles, electrical and electronic equipment, and electrical machinery).

== Tourism ==
To stimulate local tourism, the Puerto Rico Tourism Company launched the Voy Turistiendo ("I'm Touring") campaign, with a passport book and website. The Gurabo page lists Plaza de los Próceres, Escaleras de Gurabo, and Lago Carraízo, as places of interest.

=== Landmarks and places of interest ===
Some landmarks and places of interest in Gurabo include:

- Centro de Exposición - Exhibition Center
- El Cerro
- Former City Hall and Clock
- Church of San José
- Luis Muñoz Marín Plaza (main square of the downtown area)
- Hacienda Mirador - Mirador Estate
- University of Turabo Museum
- Cofresí Park

== Culture ==
=== Festivals and events ===
Gurabo celebrates its patron saint festival in March. The Fiestas Patronales de San Jose is a religious and cultural celebration that generally features parades, games, artisans, amusement rides, regional food, and live entertainment.

Other festivals and events celebrated in Gurabo include:

- El Festival del Jodío, which roughly translates to the "Festival of the person who is down on their luck". The seventh annual fair was held in May, 2017. With the assistance of a local bank, funds are collected to help any person in the community with severe medical needs.
- Home Garden Festival (May)
- Youth Festival (May)
- Mapeyé Festival (October)

=== Sports ===
Gurabo has a baseball academy named Puerto Rico Baseball Academy and High School (PRBAHS).

Colegio Bautista de Gurabo (Sports: Volleyball, Soccer, Basketball, Softball, Track and Field.) colegiobautistadegurabo.com

== Demographics ==
Historical population
Census	Pop.	Note	%±
1900	8,700		—
1910	11,139		28.0%
1920	12,882		15.6%
1930	15,095		17.2%
1940	15,870		5.1%
1950	16,395		3.3%
1960	16,603		1.3%
1970	18,289		10.2%
1980	23,574		28.9%
1990	28,737		21.9%
2000	36,743		27.9%
2010	45,369		23.5%
2020	40,622		−10.5%
2025 (est.)	39,780	▼	−2.1%
U.S. Decennial Census; 1899 (shown as 1900) 1910-1930; 1930-1950 1960-2000 2010 2020

In 2000, Gurabo had a population of 36,743 and in 2010 it had a population of 45,369. In 2020, the population dropped to 40,622.

== Government ==
Like all municipalities in Puerto Rico, Gurabo is administered by a mayor. The current mayor is Rosachely Rivera Santana, from the New Progressive Party (PNP). Rivera was first elected as part of a special election held on April 2, 2017. Rivera Santana has since been re-elected two times, most recently at the 2024 general elections.

The city belongs to the Puerto Rico Senatorial district VII, which is represented by two Senators. In 2024, Wanda Soto Tolentino and Luis Daniel Colón La Santa were elected as District Senators.

== Transportation ==
There are 20 bridges in Gurabo.

== Symbols ==
The municipio has an official flag and coat of arms.

=== Flag ===
With eleven stripes, six green and five yellow, alternated, the yellow with the superior (top) edge indented forming a stairway.

=== Coat of arms ===
In a green field resides a widened gold patriarchal cross. Below the bottom arm are two shields in silver. The one on the left has a fleur de lis and the one on the right three lilies with stems in a natural way. Three towers in gold crown the shield.

== Education ==
- Ana G. Mendez University, Gurabo campus in Navarro
- Puerto Rico Criminal Justice College - Gurabo campus (Puerto Rico Police Academy)

== See also ==
- List of Puerto Ricans
- History of Puerto Rico
- Did you know-Puerto Rico?
