= Jaguas, Gurabo, Puerto Rico =

Barrio of Puerto Rico

Jaguas
- Barrio
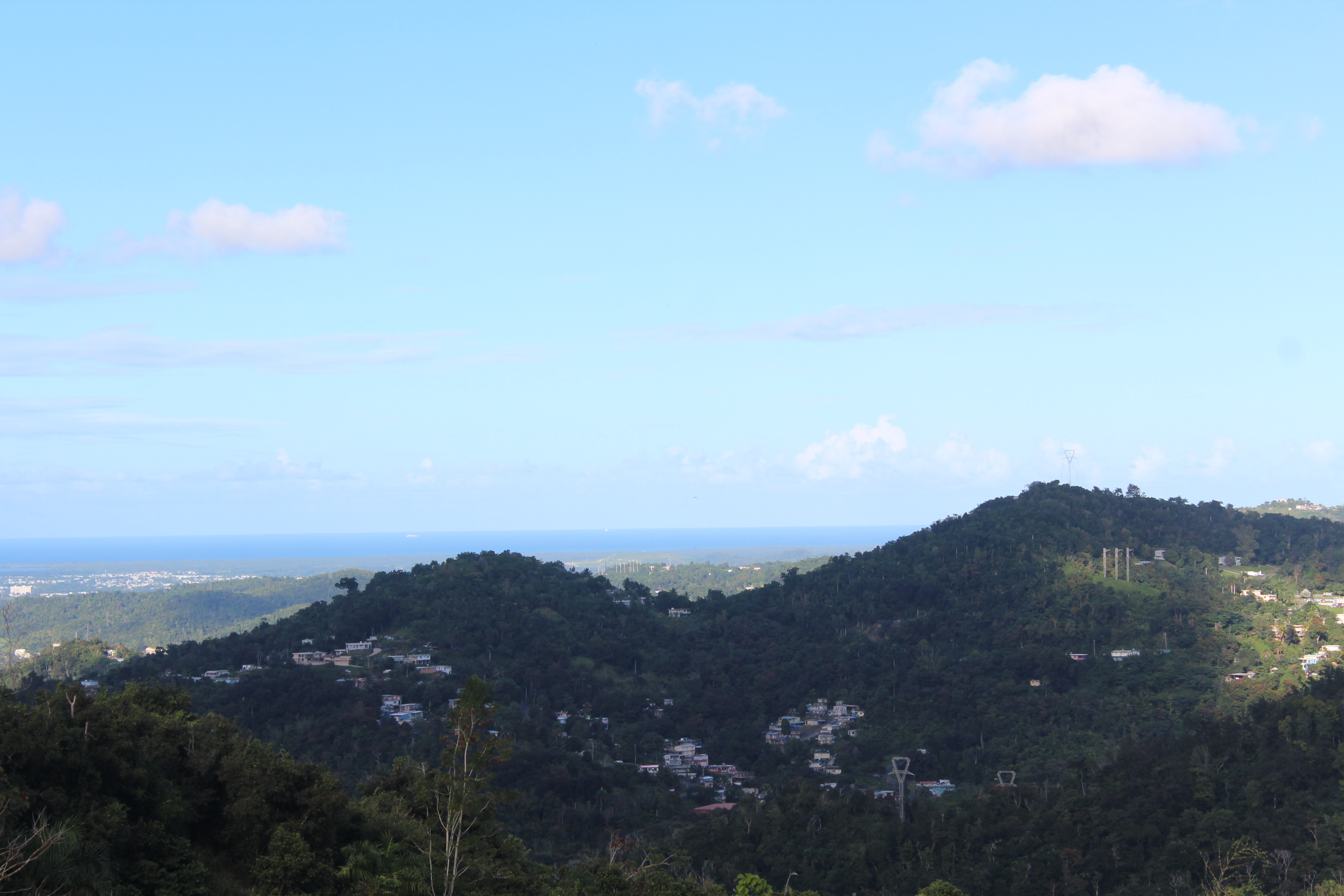
- Homes in the mountains of Jaguas

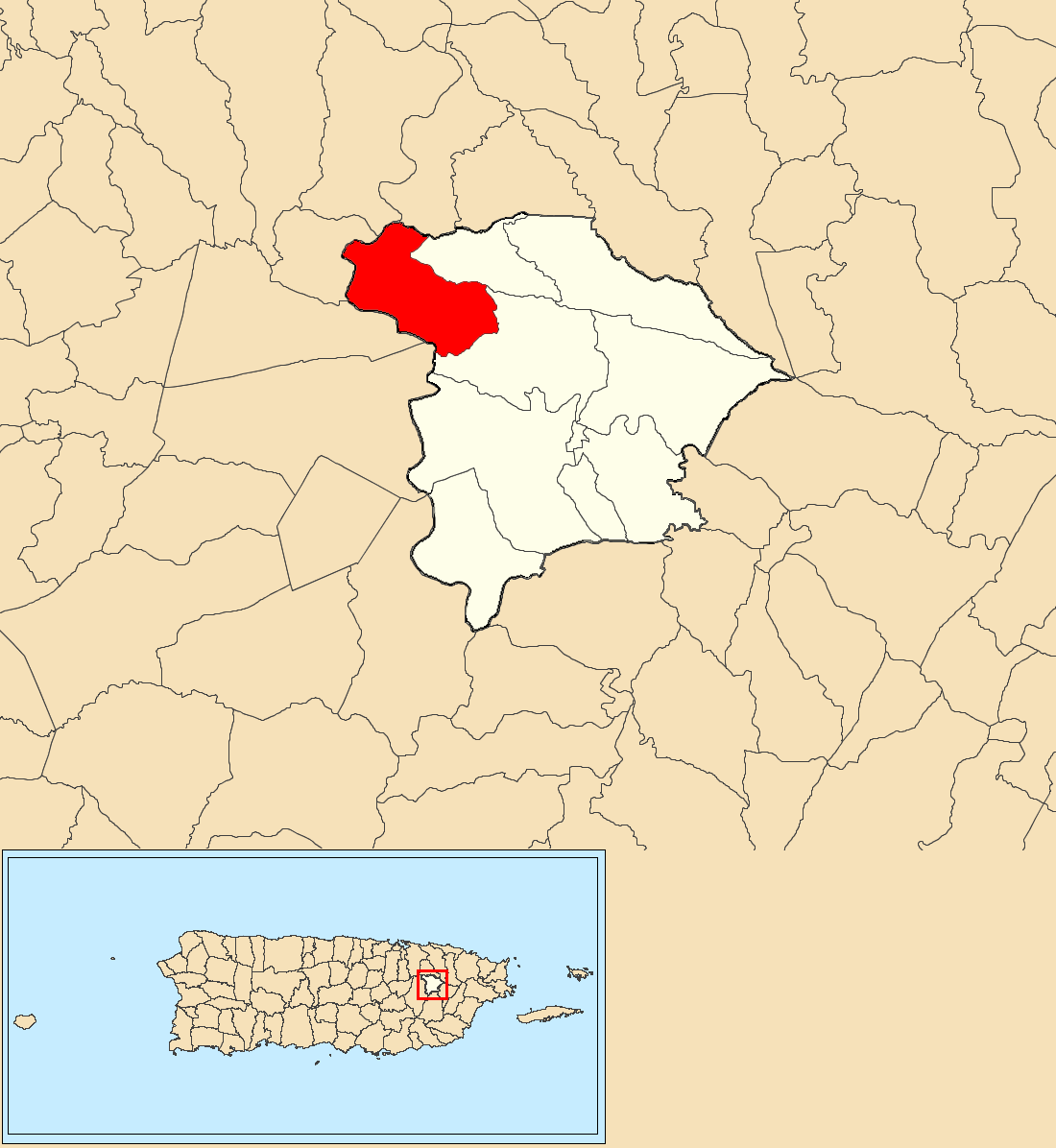
- Location of Jaguas within the municipality of Gurabo shown in red

- Location of Puerto Rico
- Coordinates: 18°17′25″N 66°00′36″W
- Commonwealth: Puerto Rico
- Municipality: Gurabo

Area
  - Total: 3.08 sq mi (8.0 km^{2})
  - Land: 2.88 sq mi (7.5 km^{2})
  - Water: 0.2 sq mi (0.52 km^{2})
- Elevation: 689 ft (210 m)

Population (2010)
  - Total: 2,083
  - Density: 723.3/sq mi (279.3/km^{2})
- Source: 2010 Census
- Time zone: UTC−4 (AST)
- ZIP Code: 00778

Jaguas is a barrio in the municipality of Gurabo, Puerto Rico. Its population in 2010 was 2,083.

== History ==
Jaguas was in Spain's gazetteers until Puerto Rico was ceded by Spain in the aftermath of the Spanish–American War under the terms of the Treaty of Paris of 1898 and became an unincorporated territory of the United States. In 1899, the United States Department of War conducted a census of Puerto Rico finding that the population of Jaguas barrio was 868.

Historical population
Census	Pop.	Note	%±
1900	868		—
1910	962		10.8%
1920	1,078		12.1%
1930	1,257		16.6%
1940	1,349		7.3%
1950	1,369		1.5%
1960	1,240		−9.4%
1970	1,388		11.9%
1980	1,551		11.7%
1990	1,790		15.4%
2000	2,075		15.9%
2010	2,083		0.4%
U.S. Decennial Census; 1899 (shown as 1900) 1910-1930; 1930-1950 1980-2000 2010

== Sectors ==
Barrios (which are, in contemporary times, roughly comparable to minor civil divisions) in turn are further subdivided into smaller local populated place areas/units called sectores (sectors in English). The types of sectores may vary, from normally sector to urbanización to reparto to barriada to residencial, among others.

The following sectors are in Jaguas barrio:

Hacienda Mirador, Jaguas Lomas, Quintas del Lago, Sector Adorno, Sector Arturo López, Sector Cáceres, Sector Calletano Sanchéz, Sector Carazo, Sector Carrasquillo, Sector Colón Flores, Sector Cosme, Sector Negrón, Sector Díaz, Sector Felipe Ocasio, Sector Felix Díaz, Sector Guillermo Flores, Sector Isidro Vázquez, Sector Jaguas Llanos, Sector Jaguas Peñón, Sector Juan Guadalupe, Sector La Agrícola, Sector Las Casitas, Sector Llinás, Sector Los Colones, Sector Los Oyola, Sector Los Paganes, Sector Los Quiñones, Sector Los Vives, Sector Márquez, Sector Núñez, Sector Ocasio, Sector Oller, Sector Olmedo, Sector Oyola, Sector Pagán, Sector Pepe Díaz, Sector Richard Rivera, Sector Soto, Sector Tino Torres, Sector Urrutia, Sector Viera Pérez, Sector Vives, and Sector Zavala.

== See also ==
- List of communities in Puerto Rico
- List of barrios and sectors of Gurabo, Puerto Rico
