= Navarro, Gurabo, Puerto Rico =

Barrio of Puerto Rico

Navarro
- Barrio
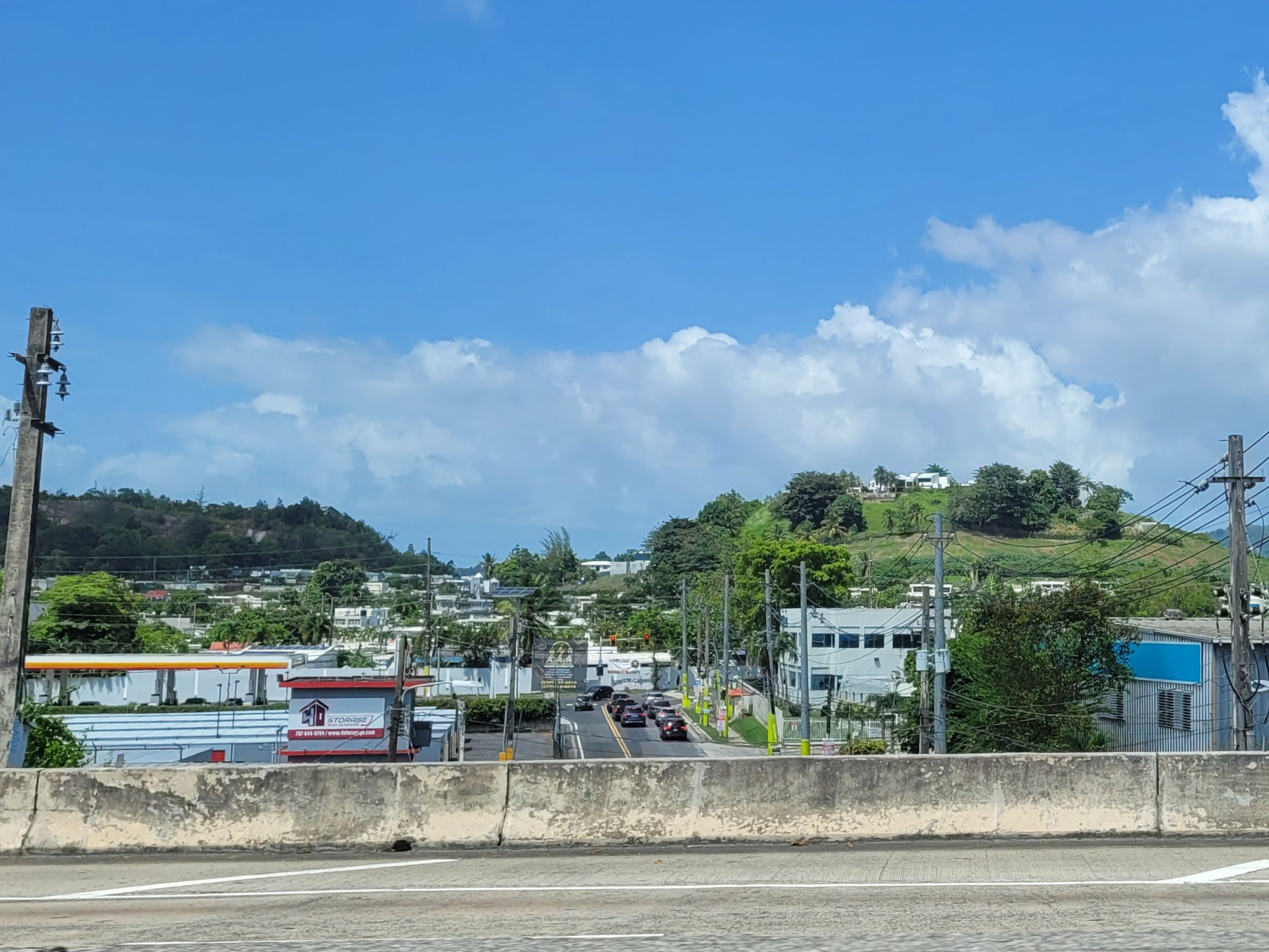
- Puerto Rico Highway 931 between Navarro and Rincón

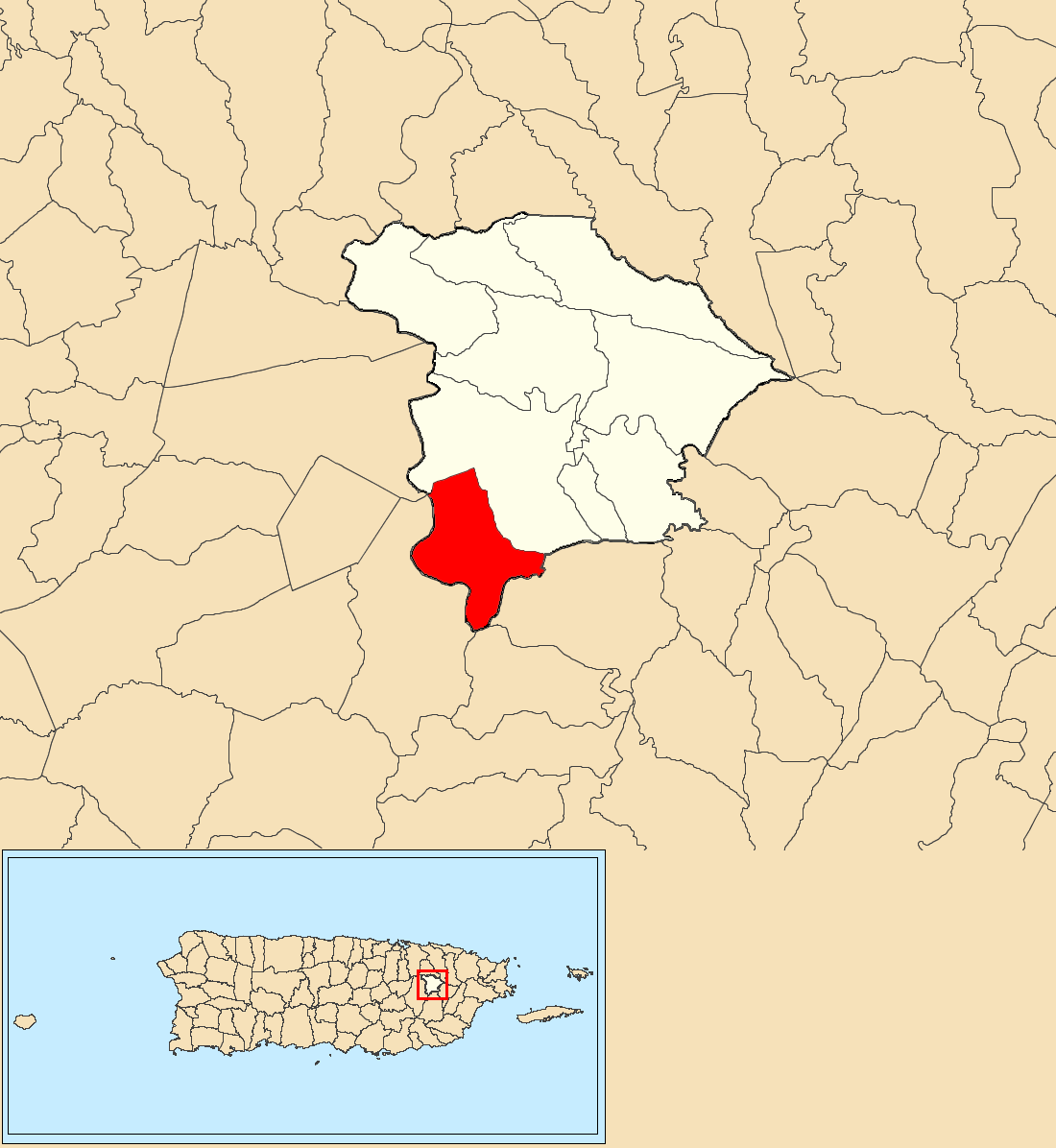
- Location of Navarro within the municipality of Gurabo shown in red

- Location of Puerto Rico
- Coordinates: 18°13′36″N 65°59′57″W
- Commonwealth: Puerto Rico
- Municipality: Gurabo

Area
  - Total: 2.81 sq mi (7.3 km^{2})
  - Land: 2.78 sq mi (7.2 km^{2})
  - Water: 0.03 sq mi (0.078 km^{2})
- Elevation: 262 ft (80 m)

Population (2010)
  - Total: 10,561
  - Density: 3,798.9/sq mi (1,466.8/km^{2})
- Source: 2010 Census
- Time zone: UTC−4 (AST)
- ZIP Code: 00778

Navarro is a barrio in the municipality of Gurabo, Puerto Rico. Its population in 2010 was 10,561.

== History ==
Navarro was in Spain's gazetteers until Puerto Rico was ceded by Spain in the aftermath of the Spanish–American War under the terms of the Treaty of Paris of 1898 and became an unincorporated territory of the United States. In 1899, the United States Department of War conducted a census of Puerto Rico finding that the combined population of Navarro and Quebrada Infierno barrios was 1,093.

Historical population
Census	Pop.	Note	%±
1910	792		—
1920	938		18.4%
1930	966		3.0%
1940	1,308		35.4%
1950	965		−26.2%
1960	677		−29.8%
1970	1,898		180.4%
1980	2,976		56.8%
1990	3,131		5.2%
2000	5,015		60.2%
2010	10,561		110.6%
U.S. Decennial Census; 1900 (N/A) 1910-1930; 1930-1950 1980-2000 2010

== Sectors ==
Barrios (which are, in contemporary times, roughly comparable to minor civil divisions) in turn are further subdivided into smaller local populated place areas/units called sectores (sectors in English). The types of sectores may vary, from normally sector to urbanización to reparto to barriada to residencial, among others.

The following sectors are in Navarro barrio:

Alturas de Santa Bárbara, Apartamentos Maga Tree Village, Apartamentos Las Vistas de Gurabo, Apartamentos Paseo Gran Vista, College High, Condominio El Alcázar, Condominio Paseo Gales, Condominio Ventanas de Gurabo, Parcelas Navarro, Reina de los Ángeles, Sector Bruceles, Sector Carlos Rivera, Sector Cielito, Sector Los Flamboyanes, Sector Los Flores, Sector Los Pinos, Sector Los Solares, Sector Mano Manca, Sector Pachanga, Sector Quebrada, Sector Santa Bárbara, Urbanización Alta Paz, Urbanización Campiñas de Navarro, Urbanización Colinas de Navarro, Urbanización College Hills, Urbanización El Convento, Urbanización Estancias de Gran Vista, Urbanización Estancias de Monte Verde, Urbanización Estancias de Santa Bárbara, Urbanización Gran Vista I, Urbanización Gran Vista II, Urbanización Horizontes, Urbanización Las Lilas, Urbanización Mansiones de Navarro, Urbanización Mansiones de Santa Bárbara, Urbanización Monte Alto, Urbanización Monte Brisas, Urbanización Monte Subasio, Urbanización Paraíso de Santa Bárbara, Urbanización Paseos de Santa Bárbara, Urbanización Praderas de Navarro, Urbanización Preciosa, Urbanización Sabanera del Río, Urbanización Santa Bárbara, Urbanización Valle Santa Bárbara, Urbanización Ventanas Al Valle, Urbanización Vereda, and Valle Borikén.

== See also ==
- List of communities in Puerto Rico
- List of barrios and sectors of Gurabo, Puerto Rico
