= Celada, Gurabo, Puerto Rico =

Barrio of Puerto Rico

Celada
- Barrio
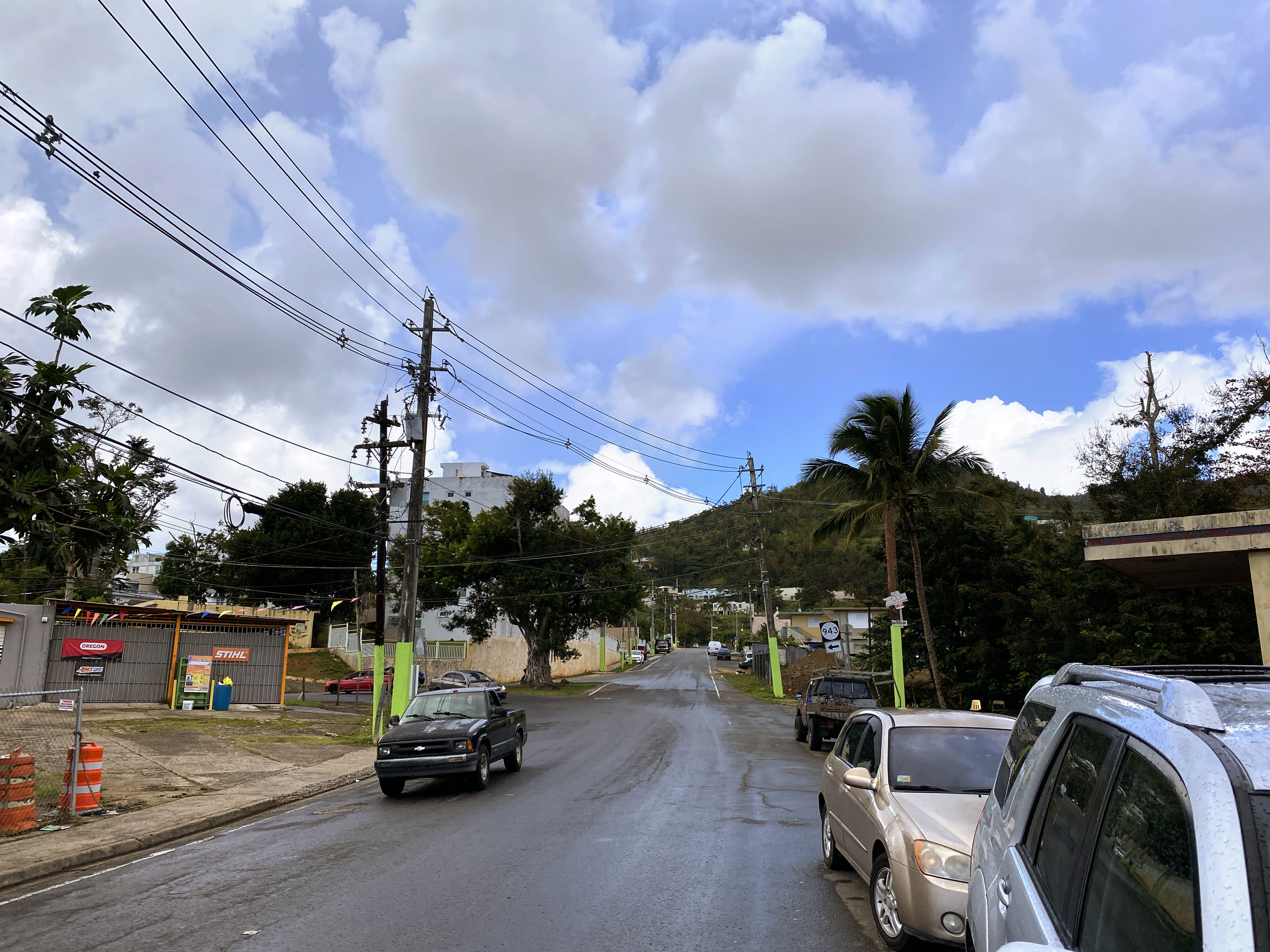
- Near PR-943 in Celada

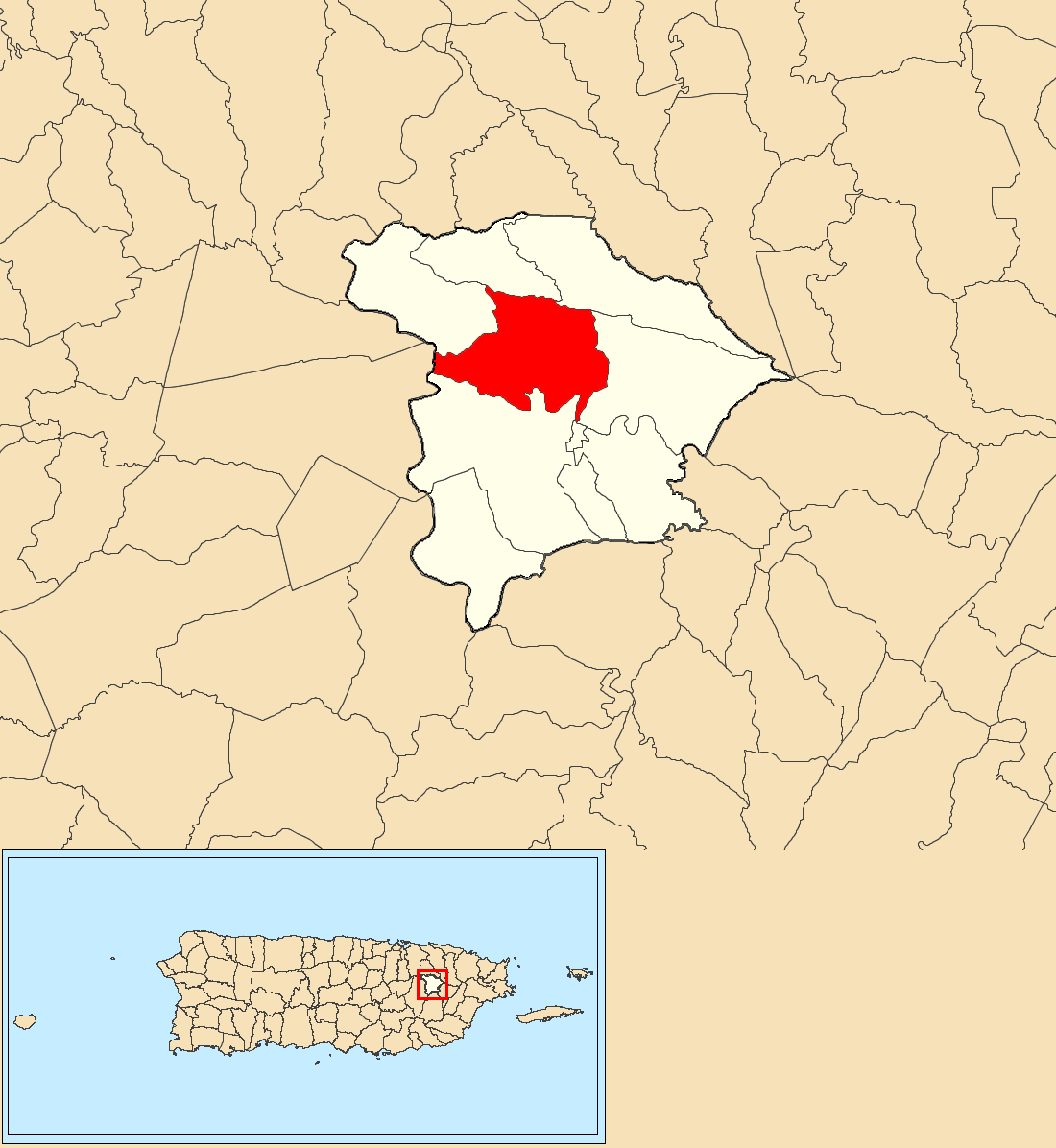
- Location of Celada within the municipality of Gurabo shown in red

- Location of Puerto Rico
- Coordinates: 18°16′21″N 65°58′52″W
- Commonwealth: Puerto Rico
- Municipality: Gurabo

Area
  - Total: 3.61 sq mi (9.3 km^{2})
  - Land: 3.55 sq mi (9.2 km^{2})
  - Water: 0.06 sq mi (0.16 km^{2})
- Elevation: 249 ft (76 m)

Population (2010)
  - Total: 3,160
  - Density: 890.1/sq mi (343.7/km^{2})
- Source: 2010 Census
- Time zone: UTC−4 (AST)
- ZIP Code: 00778

Celada is a barrio in the municipality of Gurabo, Puerto Rico. Its population in 2010 was 3,160.

== History ==
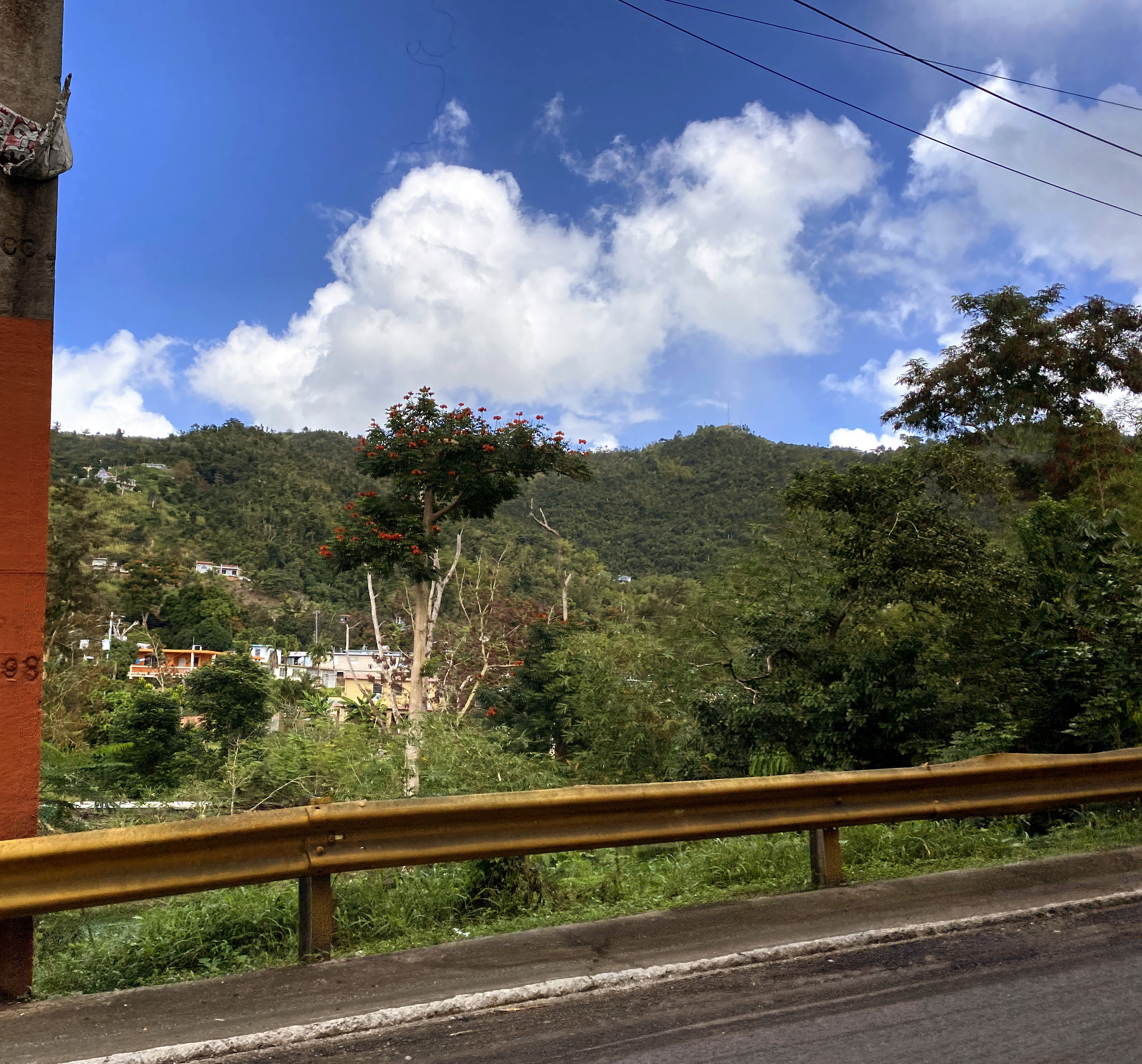
Homes on a mountainside in Celada

Celada was in Spain's gazetteers until Puerto Rico was ceded by Spain in the aftermath of the Spanish–American War under the terms of the Treaty of Paris of 1898 and became an unincorporated territory of the United States. In 1899, the United States Department of War conducted a census of Puerto Rico finding that the population of Celada barrio was 964.

Historical population
Census	Pop.	Note	%±
1900	964		—
1910	1,236		28.2%
1920	1,560		26.2%
1930	1,770		13.5%
1940	1,729		−2.3%
1950	1,905		10.2%
1960	1,837		−3.6%
1970	1,356		−26.2%
1980	1,778		31.1%
1990	1,709		−3.9%
2000	2,288		33.9%
2010	3,160		38.1%
U.S. Decennial Census; 1899 (shown as 1900) 1910-1930; 1930-1950 1980-2000 2010

== Sectors ==
Barrios (which are, in contemporary times, roughly comparable to minor civil divisions) in turn are further subdivided into smaller local populated place areas/units called sectores (sectors in English). The types of sectores may vary, from normally sector to urbanización to reparto to barriada to residencial, among others.

The following sectors are in Celada barrio:

Alturas de Celada, Apartamentos Villas del Soportal, Parcelas Toquí, Sector Casul (Carretera 181, km 22.6), Sector Celada Centro, Sector El Abanico, Sector El Colchón, Sector El Trapiche, Sector Eugenio Ruíz, Sector Faro Gómez, Sector Felo Reyes, Sector Hernáiz, Sector Juan Acevedo, Sector La Tablita, Sector La Tosca, Sector Los Chinos Sur, Sector Los Chinos, Sector Los Meléndez, Sector Los Pocholos, Sector Los Toledo, Sector Ortiz, Sector Pepe Morales, Sector Román, Sector Rufo Ramírez, Sector Toqui, Sector Urrutia, Sector Villa Joan, Urbanización Heavenly View, and Urbanización Lomas del Sol

== See also ==
- List of communities in Puerto Rico
- List of barrios and sectors of Gurabo, Puerto Rico
