= Hato Nuevo, Gurabo, Puerto Rico =

Barrio of Puerto Rico

Hato Nuevo
- Barrio
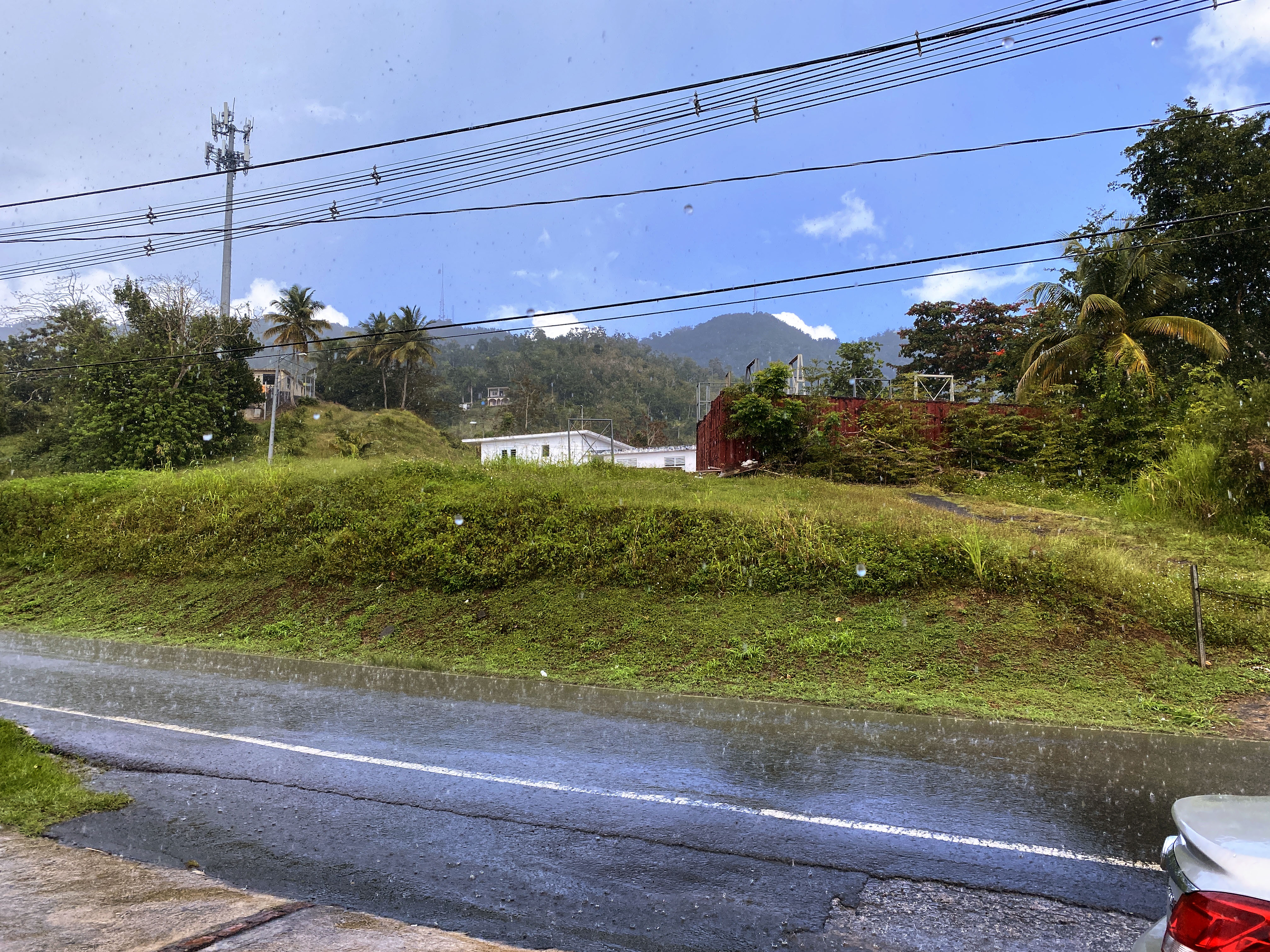
- Sector María Jiménez in Hato Nuevo

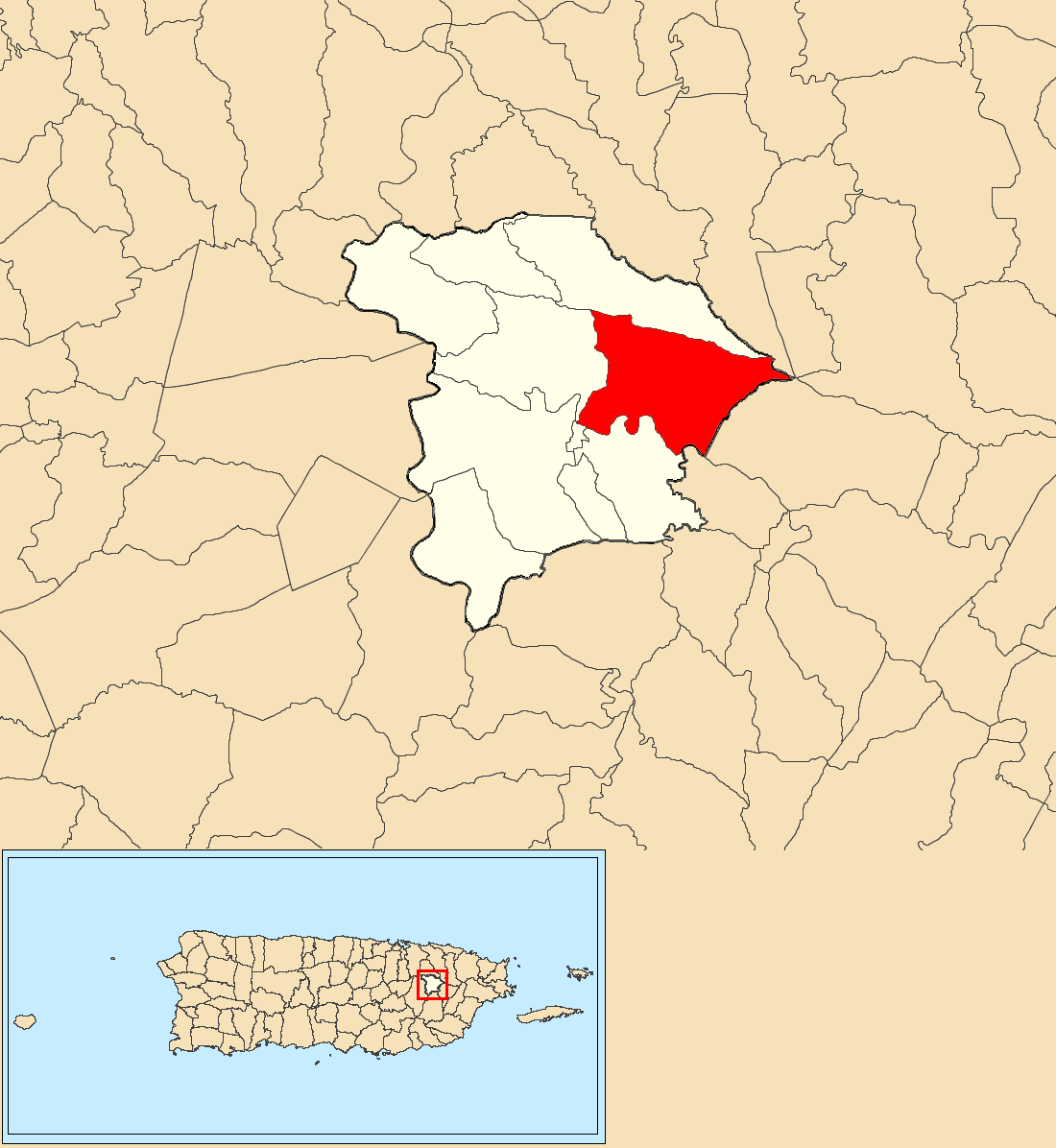
- Location of Hato Nuevo within the municipality of Gurabo shown in red

- Location of Puerto Rico
- Coordinates: 18°16′00″N 65°57′09″W
- Commonwealth: Puerto Rico
- Municipality: Gurabo

Area
  - Total: 4.39 sq mi (11.4 km^{2})
  - Land: 4.37 sq mi (11.3 km^{2})
  - Water: 0.02 sq mi (0.052 km^{2})
- Elevation: 328 ft (100 m)

Population (2010)
  - Total: 9,345
  - Density: 2,138.4/sq mi (825.6/km^{2})
- Source: 2010 Census
- Time zone: UTC−4 (AST)
- ZIP Code: 00778

Hato Nuevo is a barrio in the municipality of Gurabo, Puerto Rico. Its population in 2010 was 9,345.

== History ==
Hato Nuevo was in Spain's gazetteers until Puerto Rico was ceded by Spain in the aftermath of the Spanish–American War under the terms of the Treaty of Paris of 1898 and became an unincorporated territory of the United States. In 1899, the United States Department of War conducted a census of Puerto Rico finding that the population of Hato Nuevo barrio was 1,361.

Historical population
Census	Pop.	Note	%±
1900	1,361		—
1910	1,866		37.1%
1920	1,884		1.0%
1930	1,973		4.7%
1940	2,038		3.3%
1950	2,022		−0.8%
1960	2,183		8.0%
1970	2,922		33.9%
1980	3,382		15.7%
1990	5,236		54.8%
2000	7,377		40.9%
2010	9,345		26.7%
U.S. Decennial Census; 1899 (shown as 1900) 1910-1930; 1930-1950 1980-2000 2010

== Sectors ==
Barrios (which are, in contemporary times, roughly comparable to minor civil divisions) in turn are further subdivided into smaller local populated place areas/units called sectores (sectors in English). The types of sectores may vary, from normally sector to urbanización to reparto to barriada to residencial, among others.

The following sectors are in Hato Nuevo barrio:

Extensión Alturas de Hato Nuevo, Los Rivera, Los Sueños, Parcelas Lomas Verdes, Parcelas María Jiménez, Parcelas Nuevas Celada, Parcelas Viejas Celada, Sector Álamo, Sector Alicea, Sector Cando Gómez, Sector Cantera, Sector Caraballo, Sector Catalino Gómez, Sector Concepción Ortiz, Sector Estancia, Sector Goytía, Sector Josean Boria, Sector Lomas Verdes, Sector Los Cruces, Sector Los Gómez, Sector Los Márquez, Sector Los Ortiz, Sector Los Resto, Sector Los Solares, Sector María Jiménez, Sector Montañez, Sector Monte Moriah, Sector Niño Díaz, Sector Prudo Pérez, Sector Querube, Sector Sico Díaz, Sector Valeriano Díaz (Camilo Díaz), Sector Valeriano Díaz, Sector Valle Verde, Sector Vázquez, Sector Vidal Santos, Terra Ciudad Jardín, Urbanización Alturas de Hato Nuevo, Urbanización Los Flamboyanes, Urbanización Los Paisajes, Urbanización Los Robles, and Urbanización Vistalago.

== Gallery ==
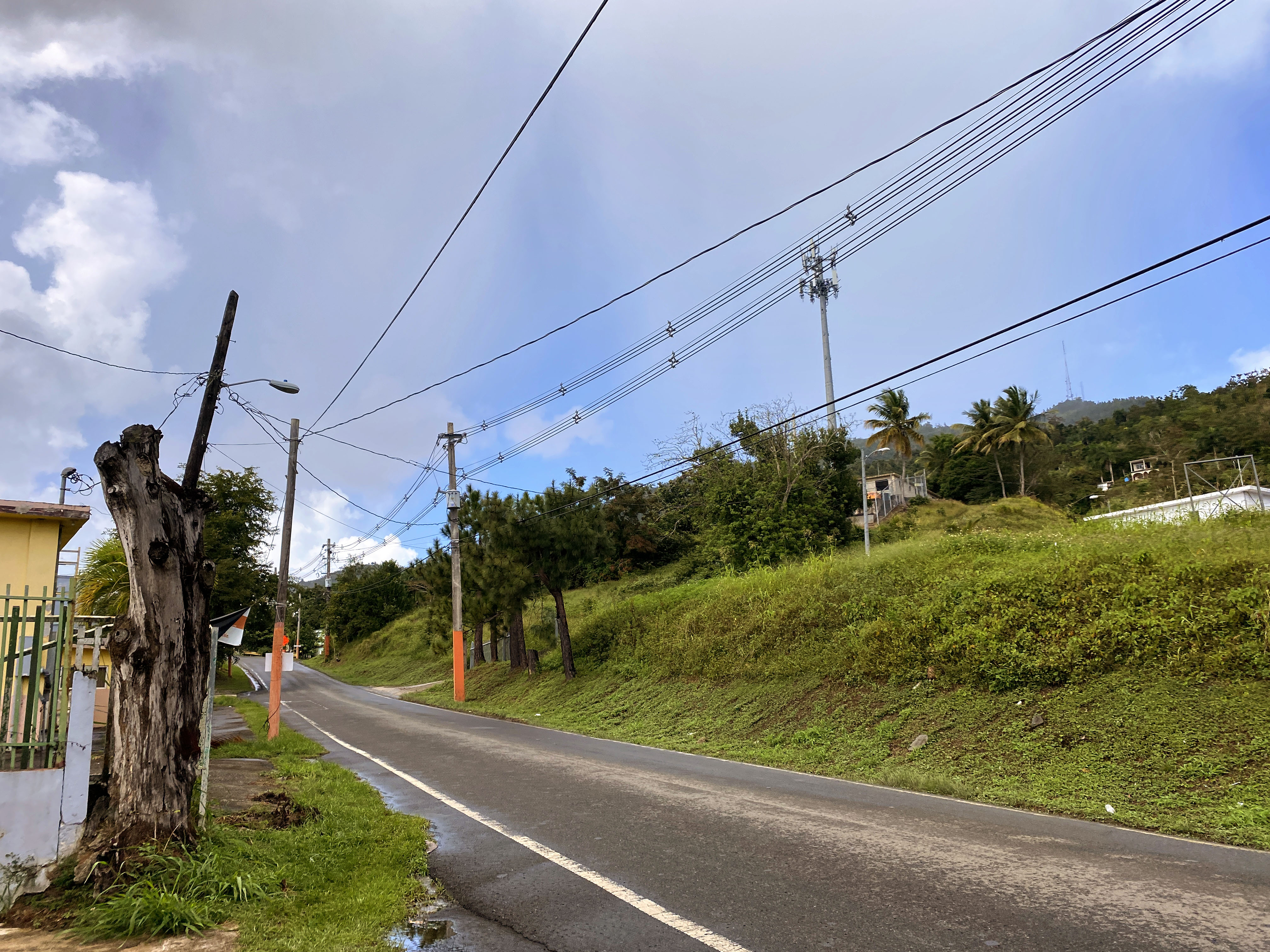
Sector María Jiménez

== See also ==
- List of communities in Puerto Rico
- List of barrios and sectors of Gurabo, Puerto Rico
