= Puerto Rico Highway 181 =

Highway in Puerto Rico

Highway 181
- Ruta 181

Route information
- Maintained by Puerto Rico DTPW
- Length: 68.65 km (42.66 mi)
- Existed: 1953–present

Major junctions
- South end: PR-3 in Patillas barrio-pueblo
- PR-759 in Marín–Matuyas Alto; PR-182 in Guayabota; PR-765 in Jagual; PR-183 in Hato–Quemados; PR-929 in Quebrada; PR-30 in Jaguar–Mamey; PR-189 in Mamey; PR-175 / PR-8860 in St. Just–Cuevas; PR-199 / PR-876 in St. Just–Cuevas; PR-3 / PR-47 in Sabana Llana Sur–Oriente
- North end: PR-17 in Oriente

Location
- Country: United States
- Territory: Puerto Rico
- Municipalities: Patillas, Maunabo, Yabucoa, San Lorenzo, Gurabo, Trujillo Alto, San Juan

Highway system
- Roads in Puerto Rico; List
← PR-180	→ PR-182

Puerto Rico Highway 181 (PR-181), also known as Expreso Trujillo Alto (Trujillo Alto Expressway), is a road in Puerto Rico connecting the municipality of San Juan on the northeastern coastal plain with Patillas on the southeastern coastal plain. Beginning in the Rio Piedras district of barrio Oriente in San Juan at Jesus de Piñero Avenue (PR-17), it runs through Trujillo Alto, Gurabo and San Lorenzo on the Caguas Valley, and western Yabucoa and eastern Patillas on the Sierra de Cayey, before ending in the Patillas Pueblo downtown area on the southeastern coastal plain of Puerto Rico. PR-181 is a four-lane highway from San Juan through the Trujillo Alto Pueblo downtown area, and completely rural on the way to Patillas with the exception of a small tract in Gurabo where it intersects PR-30. Along with PR-10, PR-149, PR-1 and PR-52, it is one of the longest roads crossing the main island from north to south.

== Route description ==
=== Rural road ===
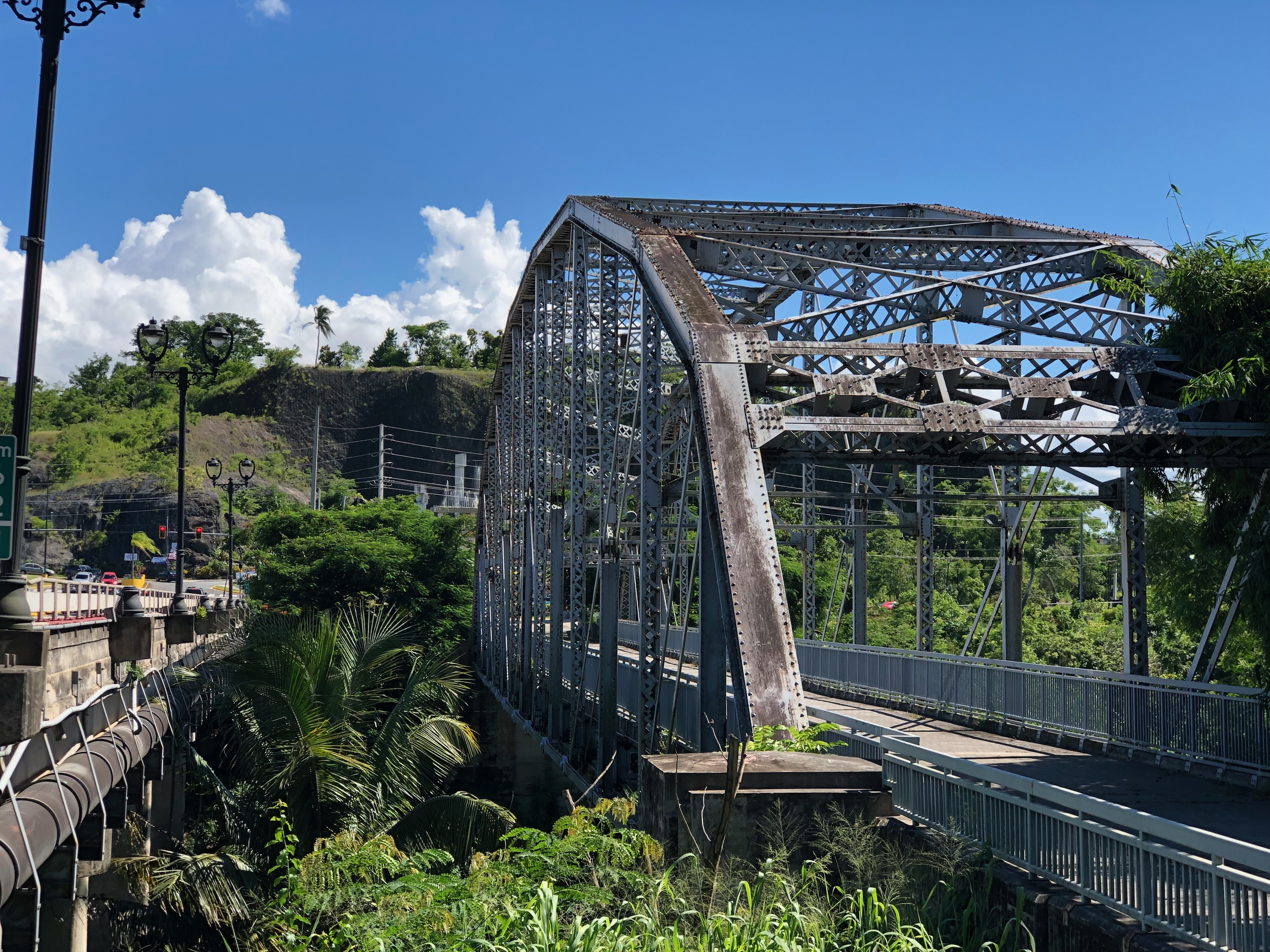
Puente de Trujillo Alto

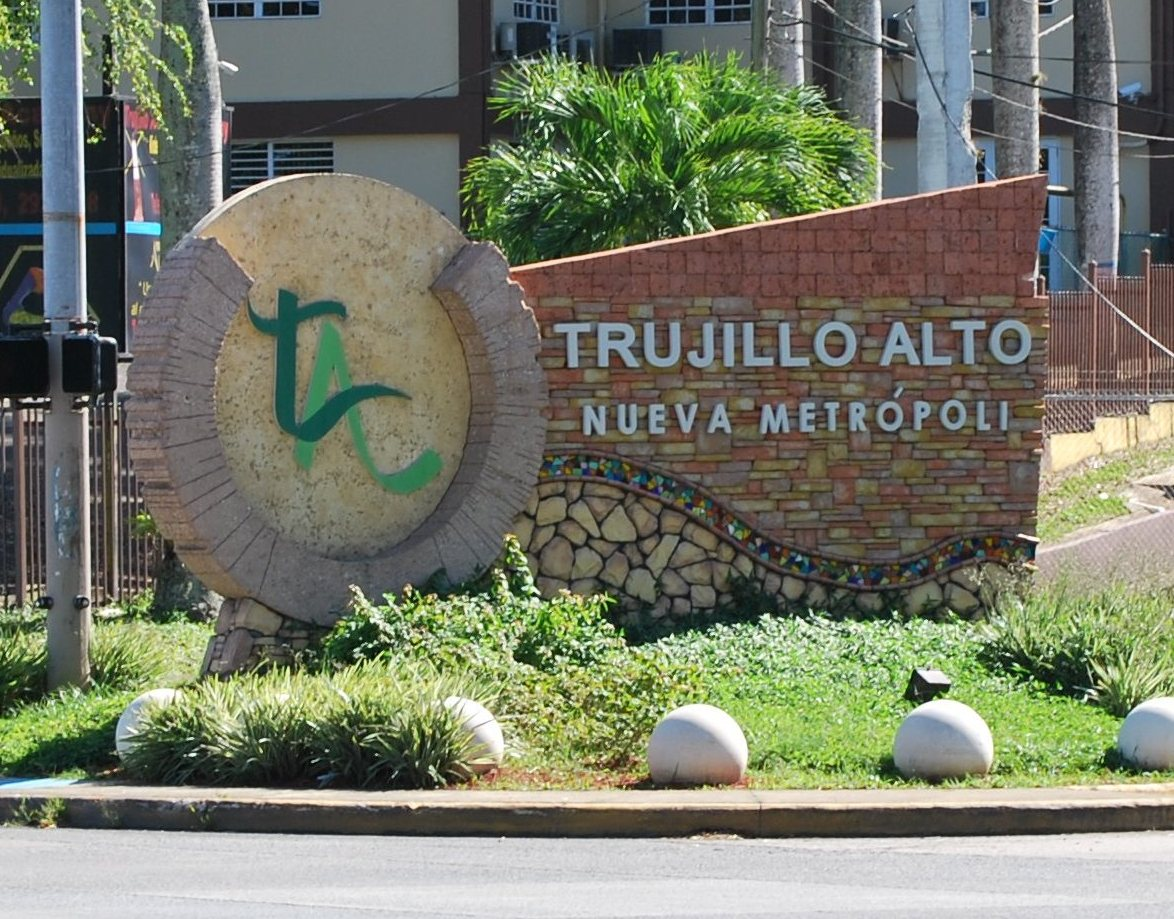
Trujillo Alto marker on PR-181

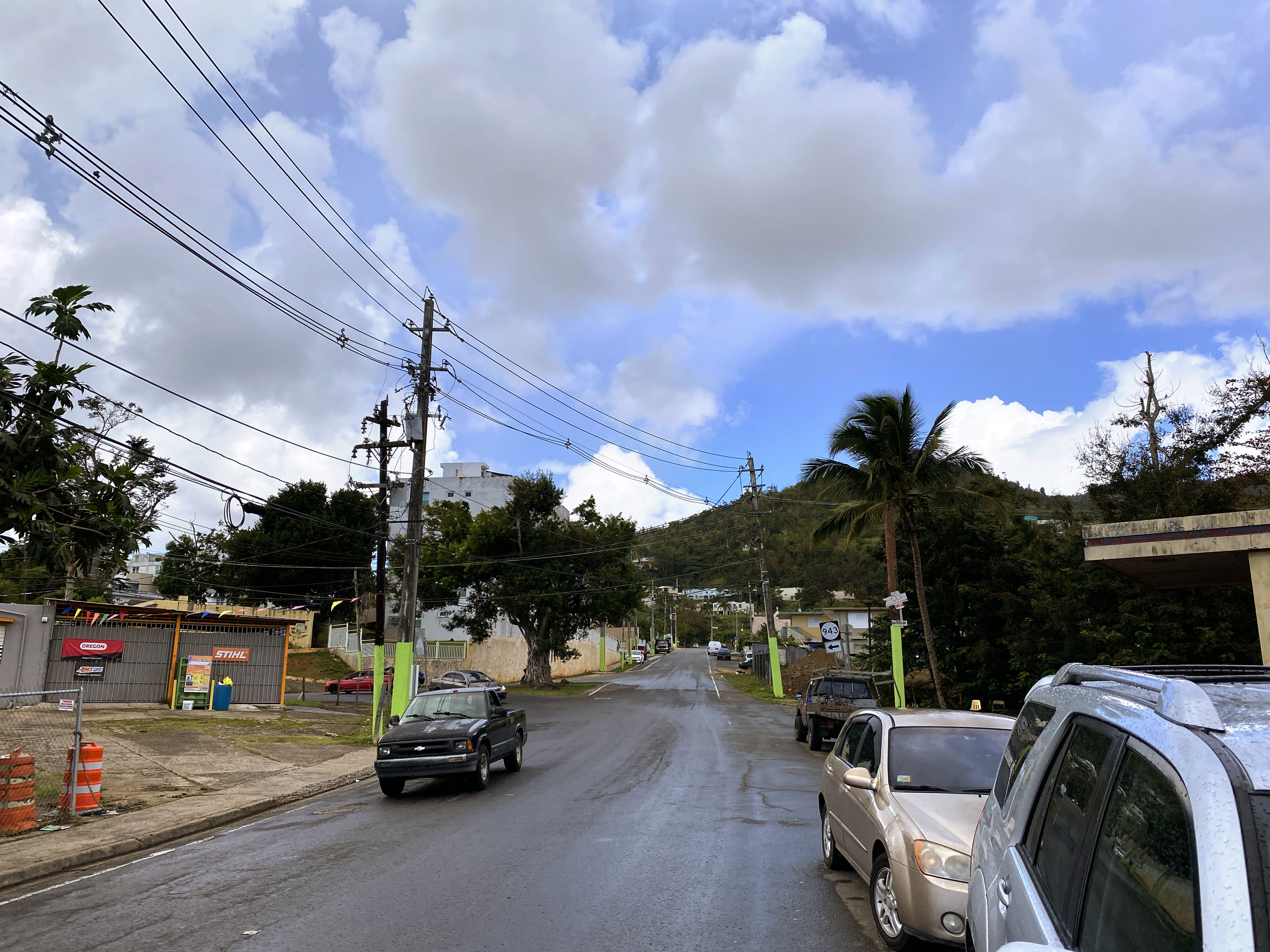
PR-181 north in Gurabo

In Trujillo Alto, near Gurabo, it turns into a rural road with very narrow lanes per direction and hard curves, making it dangerous and requiring low speed limits. In Gurabo, it becomes divided in about 1 kilometer as it intersects Puerto Rico Highway 30, and then quickly turns rural. In San Lorenzo its makes intersection with Puerto Rico Highway 183. For the rest of its length it is still rural. In Yabucoa, PR-182 begins to connect to the main town, while PR-181 continues and as it enters Patillas, it borders lake Carite, before arriving to downtown Patillas, where it meets PR-3.

== Major intersections ==
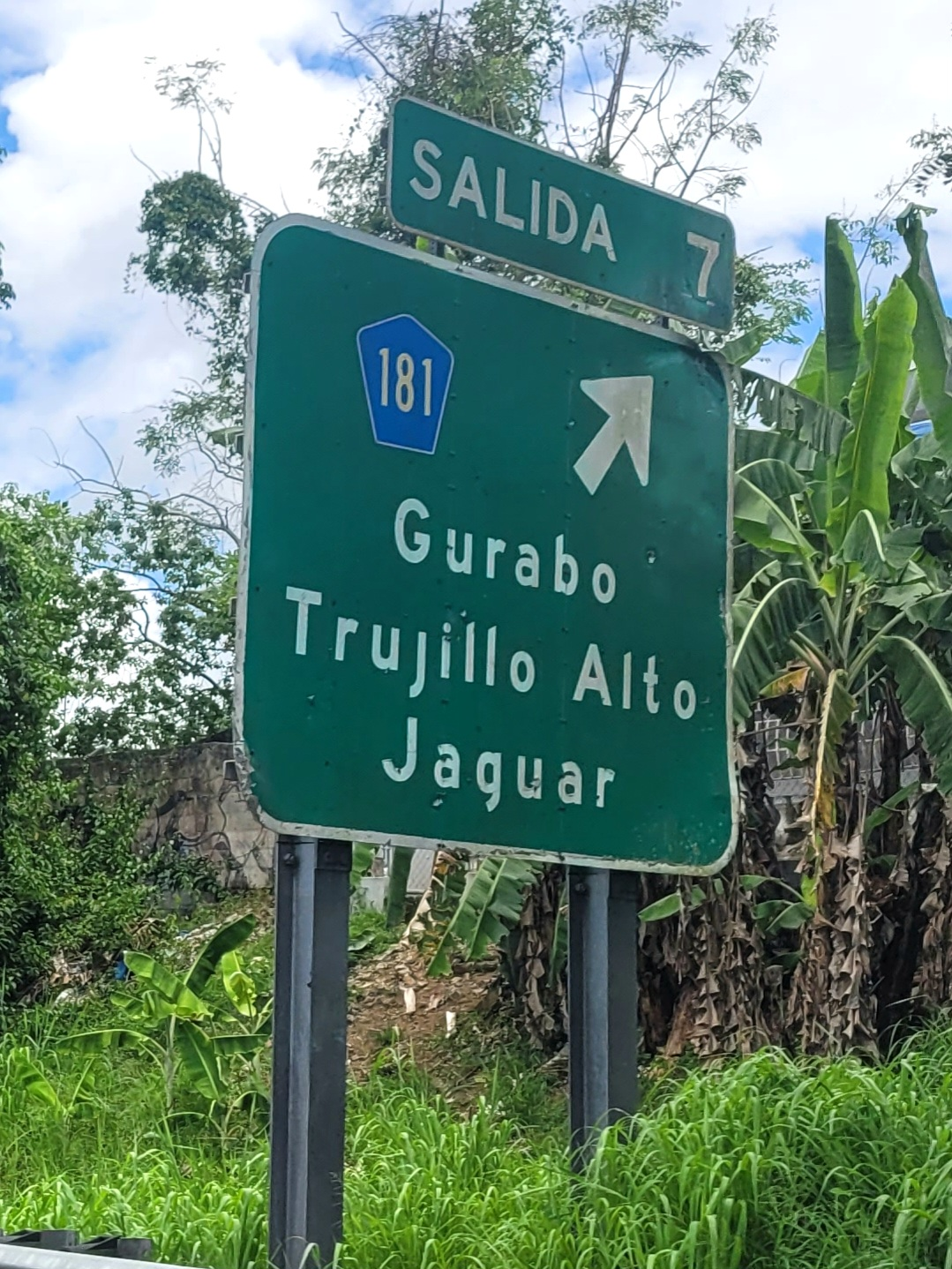
PR-30 east at exit 7 to PR-181 in Gurabo

Municipality	Location	km	mi	Destinations	Notes
Patillas	Patillas barrio-pueblo	0.0	0.0	PR-3 (Calle Luis Muñoz Rivera) – Arroyo, Maunabo	Southern terminus of PR-181
Patillas	Patillas barrio-pueblo	0.3	0.19	PR-799 – Cacao Alto	
Patillas	Marín	3.6	2.2	PR-7759 – Marín	
Patillas–Maunabo municipal line	Marín–Matuyas Alto line	10.3	6.4	PR-759 – Maunabo	
Yabucoa	Guayabota	15.1	9.4	PR-182 (Ruta Panorámica) – Yabucoa	Southern terminus of the Ruta Panorámica concurrency
San Lorenzo	Espino	20.6	12.8	PR-7740 (Ruta Panorámica) – Cayey	Northern terminus of the Ruta Panorámica concurrency; the Ruta Panorámica continues toward Patillas
San Lorenzo	Espino	21.7	13.5	PR-9920 – Quebrada Arenas	
San Lorenzo	Espino	22.0	13.7	PR-745 – Espino	
San Lorenzo	Quebrada Honda	23.0	14.3	PR-902 – Quebrada Arenas	
San Lorenzo	Quebrada Honda	24.1	15.0	PR-913 – Quebrada Honda	
San Lorenzo	Quebrada Honda	24.9	15.5	PR-9912 – Cayaguas	
San Lorenzo	Jagual	28.1	17.5	PR-765 – Jagual	
San Lorenzo	Hato–Quemados line	32.0	19.9	PR-788 – Quemados	
San Lorenzo	Hato–Quemados line	32.7 10.3 (Note: Kilometer markers represent the distance along PR-183 rather than PR-181.)	20.3 6.4	PR-183 west (Carretera Jesús Santa Aponte) – Caguas, Gurabo	Western terminus of PR-183 concurrency
San Lorenzo	Hato–Quemados line	10.6 32.8	6.6 20.4	PR-183 east (Carretera Jesús Santa Aponte) – Las Piedras	Eastern terminus of PR-183 concurrency
San Lorenzo	San Lorenzo barrio-pueblo	33.8	21.0	PR-980 (Calle Varona Suárez) – Las Piedras	One-way street; eastbound access via Calle José de Diego
San Lorenzo	San Lorenzo barrio-pueblo–Hato line	34.7	21.6	PR-9931 – Caguas	
San Lorenzo	Quebrada	37.9– 38.0	23.5– 23.6	PR-931 – Navarro	
San Lorenzo	Quebrada	38.5	23.9	PR-929 – Juncos	
Gurabo	Jaguar	40.8	25.4	PR-9933 – Juncos	
Gurabo	Jaguar–Mamey line	42.8	26.6	PR-30 (Expreso Cruz Ortiz Stella) – Caguas, San Juan, Juncos, Humacao	PR-30 exits 7 and 8; diamond interchange
Gurabo	Mamey	43.5	27.0	PR-189 – Gurabo, Juncos	
Gurabo	Celada	45.4	28.2	PR-944 – Hato Nuevo	
Gurabo	Celada	45.5	28.3	PR-943 – Gurabo	
Gurabo	Quebrada Infierno–Masa line	50.6	31.4	PR-945 – Masa	
Gurabo	Quebrada Infierno–Masa line	54.1	33.6	PR-851 (Carretera Reverendo Erasmo Ocasio Adorno) – La Gloria	
Trujillo Alto	Quebrada Negrito–Dos Bocas line	58.4	36.3	PR-852 – Quebrada Grande	
Trujillo Alto	Dos Bocas–La Gloria line	59.5	37.0	PR-851 (Carretera Reverendo Erasmo Ocasio Adorno) – La Gloria	
Trujillo Alto	Trujillo Alto barrio-pueblo–La Gloria line	61.4	38.2	PR-894 to PR-175 – Caguas	
Trujillo Alto	Río Grande de Loíza	61.7– 61.9	38.3– 38.5	Puente de Trujillo Alto	
Trujillo Alto	Cuevas–St. Just line	61.9	38.5	PR-175 / PR-8860 east to PR-876 (Carretera Federico Degetau) – Caguas, Carolina	
Trujillo Alto	Cuevas–St. Just line	63.4	39.4	PR-850 to PR-876 (Carretera Federico Degetau) – Cuevas	Southbound exit and entrance
Trujillo Alto	Cuevas–St. Just line	63.5– 63.6	39.5– 39.5	PR-199 west (Carretera Coronel Pedro L. Negrón Ramírez) / PR-876 (Carretera Federico Degetau) – Cupey, Guaynabo	
Trujillo Alto	Cuevas–St. Just line	63.8	39.6	PR-848 (Avenida Juan José "Chejuán" García Ríos) – St. Just	
Trujillo Alto–San Juan municipal line	St. Just–Cuevas– Sabana Llana Sur tripoint	65.3	40.6	PR-846 / PR-876 (Carretera Federico Degetau) – Cuevas, St. Just	
San Juan	Sabana Llana Sur	65.6	40.8	PR-877 (Avenida Trujillo Alto) – Sabana Llana Sur	
San Juan	Sabana Llana Sur–Oriente line	67.1– 67.4	41.7– 41.9	PR-3 (Avenida 65 de Infantería) / PR-47 (Calle De Diego) – Río Piedras, Caguas, Carolina	Diamond interchange
San Juan	Oriente	68.65	42.66	PR-17 (Expreso Jesús T. Piñero) – San Juan, Hato Rey, Carolina, Isla Verde	Northern terminus of PR-181; PR-17 exits 7B and 8
1.000 mi = 1.609 km; 1.000 km = 0.621 mi: Concurrency terminus; Incomplete access

== See also ==
- 1953 Puerto Rico highway renumbering
