= Quebrada =

Quebrada may refer to:

== Places ==
=== Argentina ===
- Quebrada de Las Flechas, a valley in the province of Salta in northern Argentina
- Quebrada de Humahuaca, World Heritage, a valley in the province of Jujuy in northern Argentina
- Quebrada de Luna, village in Argentina

=== Bolivia ===
- Quebrada Honda, a fossil site in southern Bolivia

=== Brazil ===
- Canoa Quebrada, a seaside resort in northeastern Brazil

=== Chile ===
- Quebrada Blanca, a large copper mine in Tarapacá Region, northern Chile
- Quebrada del Nuevo Reino, a village in Pichilemu, Chile

=== Colombia ===
- Quebrada Limas, a small river in Bogotá

=== Costa Rica ===
- Quebrada Grande, village in Guanacaste, Costa Rica

=== Puerto Rico ===
- Quebrada, Camuy, Puerto Rico, a barrio
- Quebrada, San Lorenzo, Puerto Rico, a barrio
- Quebrada Arenas, Las Piedras, Puerto Rico, a barrio
- Quebrada Arenas, Maunabo, Puerto Rico, a barrio
- Quebrada Arenas, San Lorenzo, Puerto Rico, a barrio
- Quebrada Arenas, Toa Alta, Puerto Rico, a barrio
- Quebrada Arenas, Vega Baja, Puerto Rico, a barrio
- Quebrada Arenas, San Juan, Puerto Rico, a barrio
- Quebrada Arriba, Cayey, Puerto Rico, a barrio
- Quebrada Arriba, Patillas, Puerto Rico, a barrio
- Quebrada Grande, Barranquitas, Puerto Rico, a barrio
- Quebrada Grande, Mayagüez, Puerto Rico, a barrio
- Quebrada Grande, Trujillo Alto, Puerto Rico, a barrio
- Quebrada Honda, Guayanilla, Puerto Rico, a barrio
- Quebrada Honda, San Lorenzo, Puerto Rico, a barrio
- Quebrada Limón, a barrio in Ponce, Puerto Rico
- Quebrada Maracuto, prehistoric rock paintings in Carolina, Puerto Rico
- Quebrada Seca, Ceiba, Puerto Rico, a barrio
- Quebrada Yeguas, a barrio in Salinas, Puerto Rico

=== Spain ===
- Torre Quebrada, one of the three towers on the coast of the municipality of Benalmádena, Spain

=== Venezuela ===
- La Quebrada, Venezuela, a Venezuelan city, the capital of the municipality of Urdaneta

== Other ==
- La Quebrada, a springboard moonsault attack used in professional wrestling invented by Yoshihiro Asai, better known by his gimmick name Último Dragón
- Quebrada (tango), a classic component of Argentine tango styles
