= Puerto Rico Highway 203 =

Highway in Puerto Rico

Highway 203
- Ruta 203
- Expreso Chayanne

Route information
- Maintained by Puerto Rico DTPW
- Length: 6.7 km (4.2 mi)

Major junctions
- South end: PR-183 / PR-9931 in Hato
- PR-931 in Quebrada
- North end: PR-30 in Rincón

Location
- Country: United States
- Territory: Puerto Rico
- Municipalities: San Lorenzo, Gurabo

Highway system
- Roads in Puerto Rico; List
← PR-201	→ PR-204

Puerto Rico Highway 203 (PR-203), also known as the Expreso Chayanne (after the artist who lived in San Lorenzo, Puerto Rico, as a child), is a highway which connects Gurabo, Puerto Rico at PR-30 with its parallel route Puerto Rico Highway 183 in San Lorenzo. It is the main route to San Lorenzo and is about 7 kilometers long. It is a dangerous highway, as steep grading is present going down and then going up.

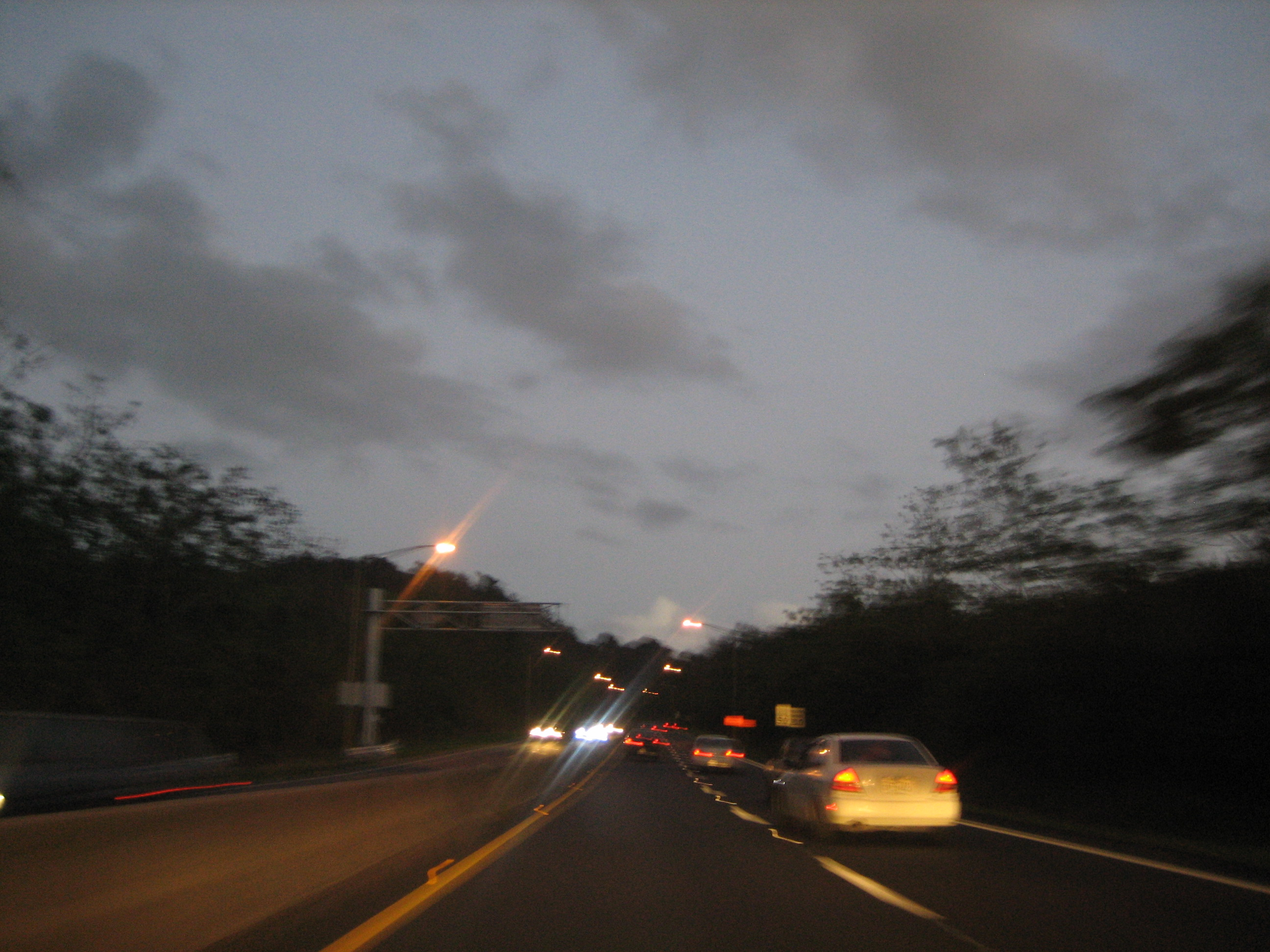
Puerto Rico Highway 203 in San Lorenzo

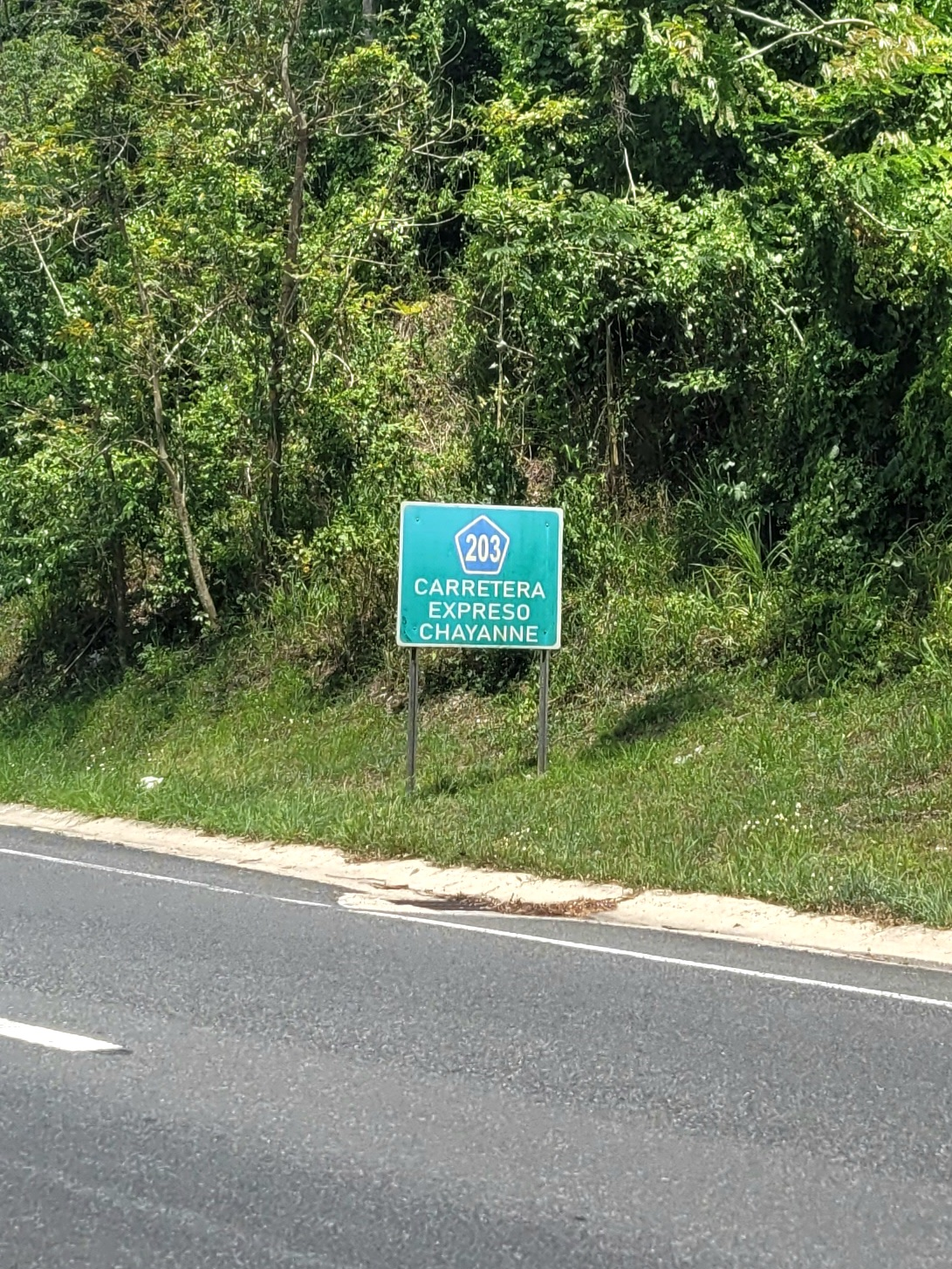
Puerto Rico Highway 203 south in Gurabo

== Major intersections ==
Municipality	Location	km	mi	Destinations	Notes
San Lorenzo	Hato	6.7	4.2	PR-183 / PR-9931 – San Lorenzo, Caguas	Southern terminus of PR-203; partial cloverleaf interchange
San Lorenzo	Quebrada	3.5– 3.4	2.2– 2.1	PR-931 – Quebrada, Navarro	At-grade intersection
Gurabo	Rincón	1.0– 0.6	0.62– 0.37	PR-Unnamed road – Senderos de Gurabo	Diamond interchange
Gurabo	Rincón	0.0	0.0	PR-30 (Expreso Cruz Ortiz Stella) – Caguas, Humacao	Northern terminus of PR-203; PR-30 exit 5; trumpet interchange
1.000 mi = 1.609 km; 1.000 km = 0.621 mi
