= List of barrios and sectors of San Lorenzo, Puerto Rico =

Like all municipalities of Puerto Rico, San Lorenzo is subdivided into administrative units called barrios, which are, in contemporary times, roughly comparable to minor civil divisions, (and means wards or boroughs or neighborhoods in English). The barrios and subbarrios, in turn, are further subdivided into smaller local populated place areas/units called sectores (sectors in English). The types of sectores may vary, from normally sector to urbanización to reparto to barriada to residencial, among others. Some sectors appear in two barrios.

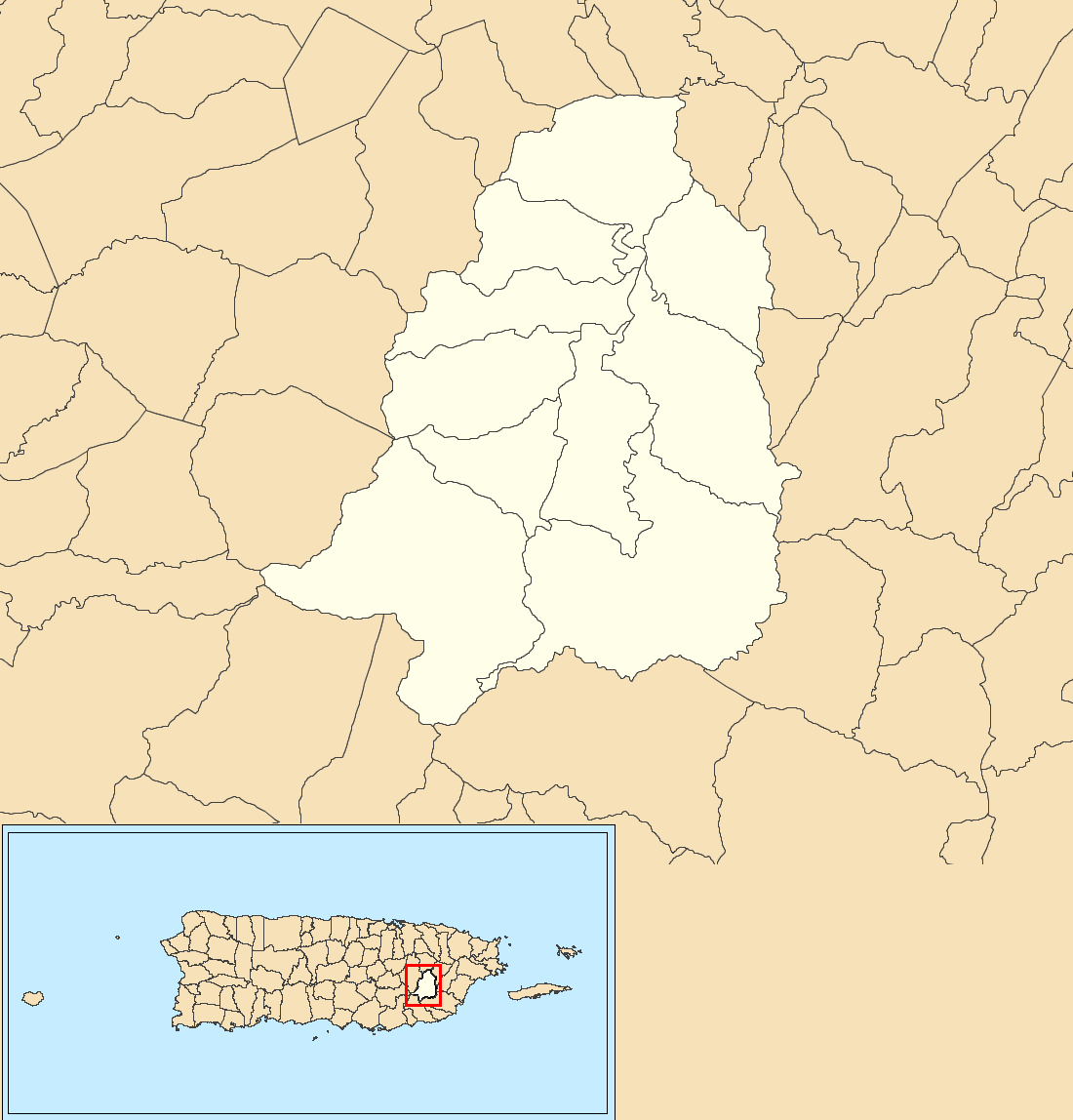
San Lorenzo map with barrio subdivisions

== List of sectors by barrio ==
=== Cayaguas ===
- Camino Carlos Colón
- Camino Esperanza Roldán
- Camino Gamalier
- Camino Los Rivera
- Camino Rivera
- Sector Alverio
- Sector Capilla
- Sector Dávila
- Sector La Represa
- Sector Los Grillos
- Sector Manchurria
- Sector Morales
- Sector Pablo Muñoz
- Sector Piedras Blancas
- Sector Rivera
- Sector Robles
- Sector Teyo Rodríguez

=== Cerro Gordo ===
- Anexo Urbanización Jardines de Cerro Gordo
- Camino Francisco Loiz
- Camino Geño Rosario
- Camino Juan Dulia
- Camino Sueño Realizado
- Camino Tensio Nieves
- Condominio Alondra
- Residencial Villas de San Lorenzo
- Sector Acueducto Abajo
- Sector Almeda
- Sector Alverio
- Sector Bone Santa
- Sector Campo Flores
- Sector Carmelita Zayas
- Sector Carrasquillo
- Sector Fermín Santiago
- Sector Hoyo Hondo
- Sector Josefa Domínguez
- Sector La Marina
- Sector Laí
- Sector Los Velázquez
- Sector Miguel Sánchez
- Sector Nato Dávila
- Sector Orozco
- Sector Pedro Power
- Sector Piedra Gorda
- Sector Roldán
- Sector Rosado
- Sector Tesoro Escondido
- Sector Velázquez
- Urbanización Alturas de San Lorenzo
- Urbanización Bosque Llano
- Urbanización Hacienda Cerro Gordo
- Urbanización Jardines de Cerro Gordo
- Urbanización Monte Rey
- Urbanización Paseos de las Flores

=== Espino ===
- Camino Los Dones
- Parcelas Espino
- Sector Benny Muñoz
- Sector Campo Alegre
- Sector Canta Gallo
- Sector Capilla o Parroquia
- Sector Chole Martínez
- Sector El Flaco
- Sector Felipe Colón
- Sector Goyo Rosario
- Sector Hilario Pérez
- Sector La Providencia
- Sector La Quinta
- Sector La Selecta
- Sector Morena
- Sector Nelson Rodríguez
- Sector Quebrada Lajas
- Sector Villa Lili

=== Florida ===
- Camino Joaquín Corona
- Camino Pedro Borges
- Ramal 9929
- Residencial Villas de San Lorenzo
- Sector Acosta
- Sector Artiri
- Sector Arturo Hernández
- Sector Camino Viejo
- Sector Cendito Torres
- Sector Contreras (Carretera 183)
- Sector Contreras (Carretera 9929)
- Sector Cuatro Calles
- Sector El Chaparral
- Sector El Coco
- Sector Fernández
- Sector González
- Sector Hacienda Mi Sueño
- Sector Las Cumbres
- Sector Los Amigos
- Sector Los Astacio
- Sector Los Calderón
- Sector Los Flores
- Sector Los Gómez
- Sector Los Mameyes
- Sector Los Paganes
- Sector Los Reyes
- Sector Miguel Sánchez
- Sector Montañez
- Sector Pedraza
- Sector Pérez
- Sector Rafael Colón
- Sector Terrazas de Florida
- Sector Tito Morales
- Sector Zarzal
- Urbanización Alejandra Valley
- Urbanización Ciudad Massó
- Urbanización Florida Garden
- Urbanización Hacienda Florida
- Urbanización Los Flamboyanes

=== Hato ===
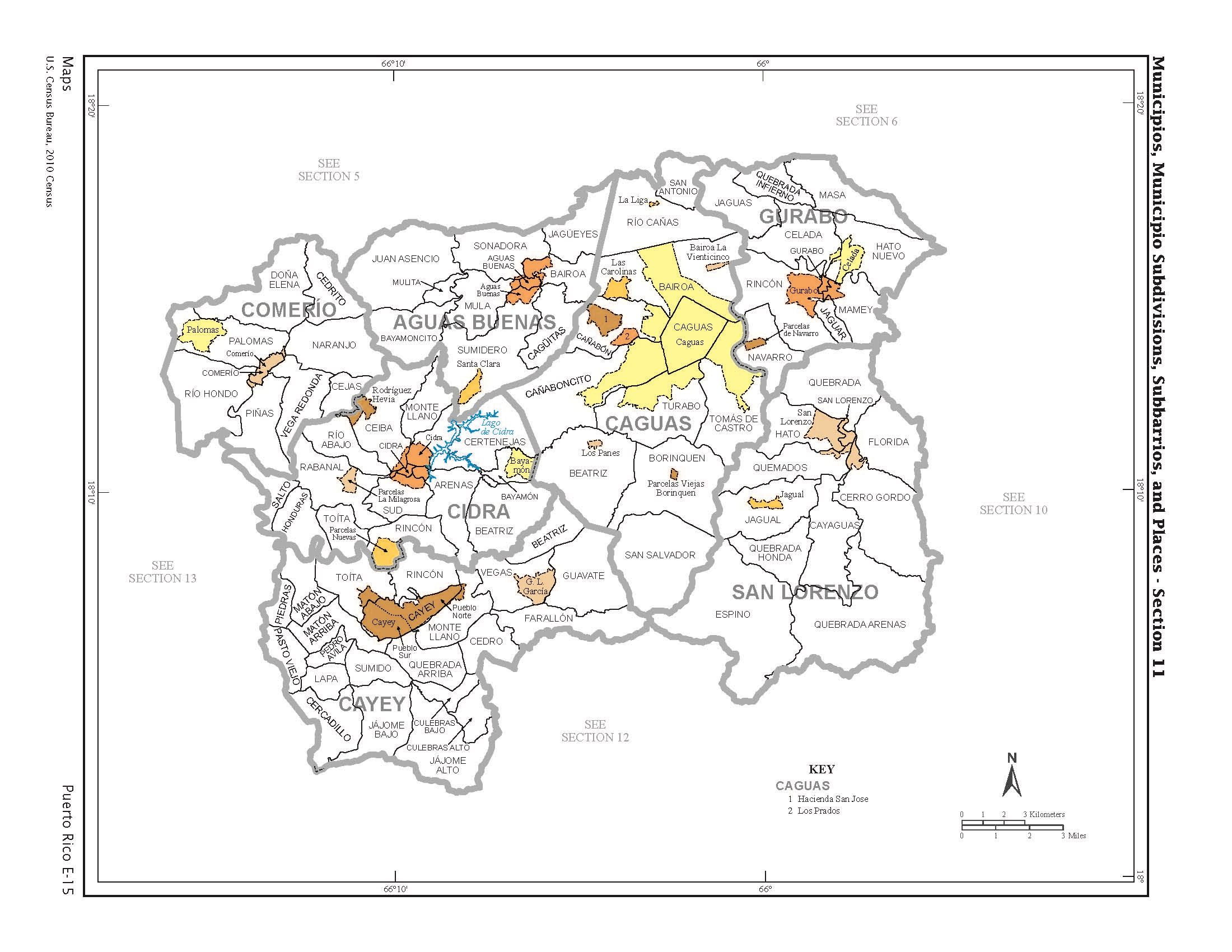
US 2010 Census map showing San Lorenzo and neighboring municipios

- Apartamentos Urbanización Valentina
- Camino Cholo Serrano
- Camino Esperanza Ramos
- Camino Julio Delgado
- Camino Los Claudio
- Extensión Tamarindos
- Haciendas de San Lorenzo
- Parcelas Hato
- Residencial Lorenzana
- Sector Buxó
- Sector Cáez
- Sector Capilla
- Sector Carfeli
- Sector Cuchilla
- Sector Federico Delgado
- Sector Hernández
- Sector La Loma
- Sector Los Adorno
- Sector Montañez
- Sector Muñoz
- Sector Neris
- Sector Oquendo
- Sector Rosa
- Sector Sánchez
- Sector Santiago
- Sector Solares Monzón
- Sector Zavala
- Tramo Carretera 183
- Urbanización Aponte y Sellés
- Urbanización Camino de las Flores
- Urbanización Carfeli
- Urbanización El Parque (Santa Clara)
- Urbanización Estancias de San Lorenzo (Ave. Mariano Olalla)
- Urbanización Los Caminos
- Urbanización Muñoz Marín
- Urbanización Portal del Sol
- Urbanización Ramos Antonini
- Urbanización San Lorenzo
- Urbanización San Lorenzo Valley
- Urbanización Tamarindos
- Urbanización Villas del Hato
- Urbanización Vistas de San Lorenzo
- Urbanización y Extensión Roosevelt

=== Jagual ===
- Carretera 181
- Comunidad Los Rosales
- Parcelas Nuevas
- Parcelas Viejas
- Sector Acueducto
- Sector Badén
- Sector Borges
- Sector Cantera
- Sector Capilla
- Sector Carlos Flores
- Sector El Cinco
- Sector El Salto
- Sector García
- Sector Juan Flores
- Sector La Ceiba
- Sector La Loma
- Sector Los Díaz
- Sector Los González
- Sector Melilla
- Sector Rabo del Buey
- Sector Vázquez

=== Quebrada ===
- Colonia Vapor
- Entrada Crematorio
- Sector Alamo
- Sector Arzuaga
- Sector Bruseles
- Sector Cachete
- Sector Capilla
- Sector Carmelo Dávila
- Sector Cuatro Calles
- Sector Gómez
- Sector Jardines de San Joaquín
- Sector Los Agosto
- Sector Los Dávila
- Sector Méndez Sector Bezares
- Sector Rojas
- Sector Santa
- Sector Serrano
- Sector Valles de San Joaquín
- Sector Valles de San Lorenzo
- Sector Vázquez
- Sector Vistas de Quebrada
- Urbanización Haciendas Parque de San Lorenzo
- Urbanización Sabanera del Río
- Urbanización Savannah Real
- Urbanización Valles de Quebrada
- Urbanización Villas de Quebrada

=== Quebrada Arenas ===
- Camino Pellín Claudio
- Sector Acueducto
- Sector Blanca Blanco
- Sector Cáez o Santana
- Sector Carmelo Figueroa
- Sector Cayo Félix
- Sector Cruz Gómez
- Sector Gerardo Villafañe
- Sector Jacobo Pérez
- Sector Lencho Flores
- Sector Lorenzo del Valle
- Sector Los Gómez
- Sector Los Guábaros
- Sector María Hernández
- Sector Miguel Angel Aponte
- Sector Ortiz
- Sector Río Playita o Sector Capilla
- Sector Ventura Martínez

=== Quebrada Honda ===
- Camino Pedro Serrano
- Sector Arroyo
- Sector Capilla o Parroquia
- Sector Cubuy, Sector Huertas
- Sector Gallera
- Sector García
- Sector La Loma
- Sector López
- Sector Mojica
- Sector Pia Colón
- Sector Puerto Moyett
- Sector Rodríguez
- Sector Vicéns

=== Quemados ===
- Camino Eliasim López
- Camino Juan Flores
- Camino Julio Morales
- Camino Loma Linda
- Comunidad Sunny Hills
- Sector Brisas del Monte
- Sector Buenos Aires
- Sector Cáez
- Sector Capilla
- Sector Carlos Flores
- Sector Carrasco
- Sector Cruces
- Sector Final
- Sector Las Colinas
- Sector Los Adorno
- Sector Muñoz
- Sector Neris
- Sector Pachín
- Sector Pané
- Sector Parcelas Quemados
- Sector Quemado Arriba
- Sector Roldán
- Sector Salvatierra
- Sector Santiago
- Sector Valles de Oasis
- Sector Vicente Pedraza
- Sector Vista San Felipe
- Urbanización Las Colinas
- Urbanización Monte Verde
- Urbanización Paseos de San Lorenzo
- Urbanización Salvatierra

=== San Lorenzo barrio-pueblo ===
- Calle Celso Barbosa
- Calle Colón
- Calle Condado
- Calle Delicias
- Calle Dr. Veve Calzada
- Calle El Edén
- Calle Emilio Buitrago
- Calle Federico Sellés
- Calle José de Diego
- Calle Julia Vázquez
- Calle Méndez Álvarez
- Calle Muñoz Rivera
- Calle Nueva
- Calle Policarpio Santana
- Calle Ramón Alcalá
- Calle Sánchez López
- Calle Santiago Iglesias Pantín
- Calle Soto
- Calle Tomás Delgado
- Calle Tous Soto
- Calle Valeriano Muñoz
- España
- Residencial Hato Grande
- Reparto Medina
- Sector Aril
- Sector Asia
- Urbanización Las Mercedes
- Urbanización Massó
- Urbanización San Miguel
- Urbanización y Extensión Jardines de San Lorenzo

== See also ==
- List of communities in Puerto Rico
