= Jagual =

Jagual may refer to:

== Places ==
- Jagual, Patillas, Puerto Rico, a barrio
- Jagual, San Lorenzo, Puerto Rico, a barrio
