= Marín, Patillas, Puerto Rico =

Barrio of Puerto Rico

Marín
- Barrio
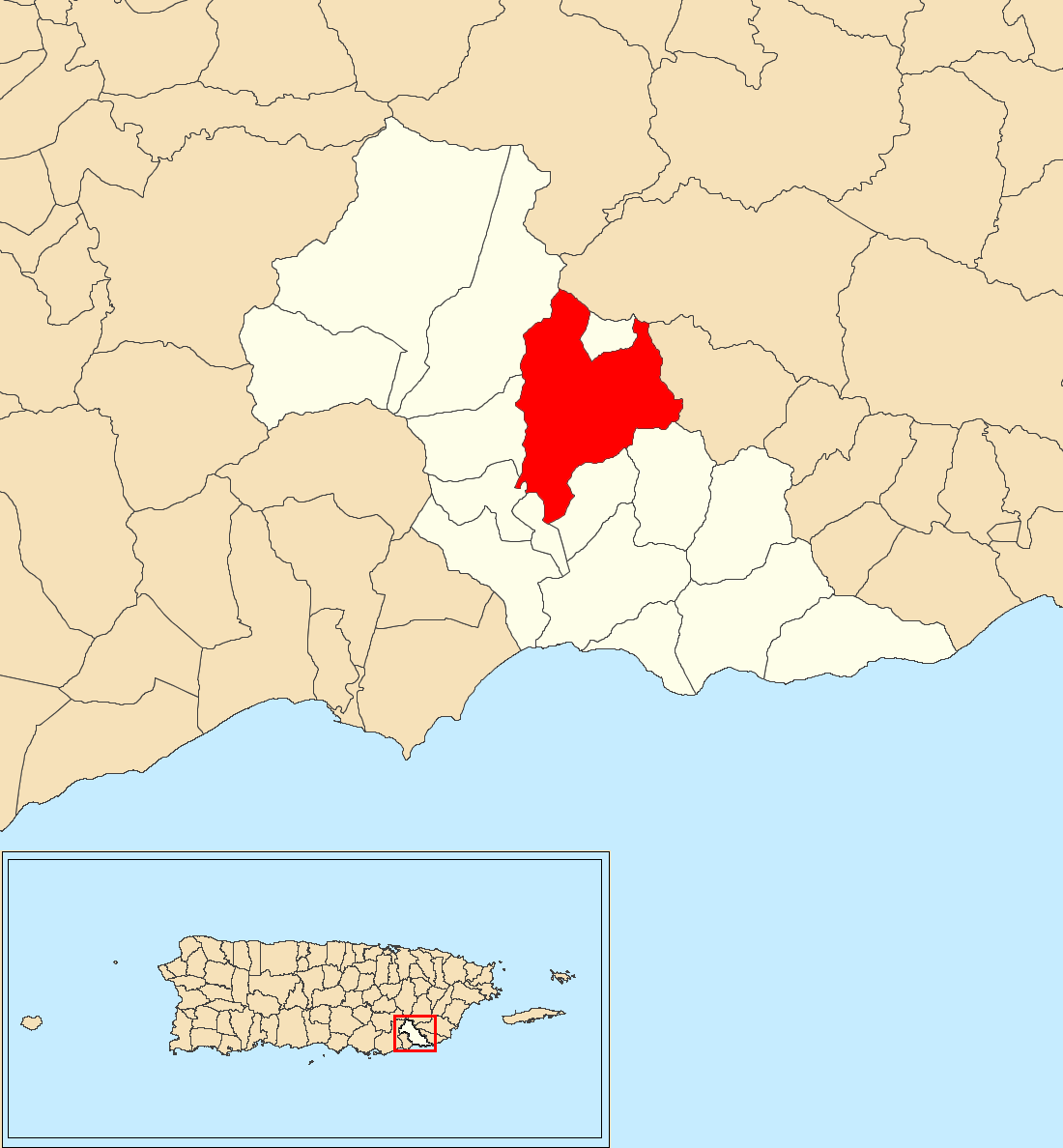
- Location of Marín within the municipality of Patillas shown in red

- Location of Puerto Rico
- Coordinates: 18°02′30″N 66°00′03″W
- Commonwealth: Puerto Rico
- Municipality: Patillas

Area
  - Total: 5.44 sq mi (14.1 km^{2})
  - Land: 5.24 sq mi (13.6 km^{2})
  - Water: 0.20 sq mi (0.52 km^{2})
- Elevation: 584 ft (178 m)

Population (2010)
  - Total: 890
  - Density: 169.8/sq mi (65.6/km^{2})
- Source: 2010 Census
- Time zone: UTC−4 (AST)
- ZIP Code: 00723
- Area code: 787/939

Marín is a barrio in the municipality of Patillas, Puerto Rico. Its population in 2010 was 890.

Historical population
Census	Pop.	Note	%±
1910	1,080		—
1920	1,156		7.0%
1930	1,321		14.3%
1940	1,625		23.0%
1950	1,851		13.9%
1960	1,670		−9.8%
1970	0		−100.0%
1980	1,313		—
1990	1,764		34.3%
2000	1,882		6.7%
2010	890		−52.7%
U.S. Decennial Census; 1900 (N/A) 1910-1930; 1930-1950 1980-2000 2010

== Sectors ==
Barrios (which are, in contemporary times, roughly comparable to minor civil divisions) in turn are further subdivided into smaller local populated place areas/units called sectores (sectors in English). The types of sectores may vary, from normally sector to urbanización to reparto to barriada to residencial, among others.

The following sectors are in Marín barrio:

Calle Jesús T. Piñero, Carretera 181, Carretera 799, Condominios Patillas, Condominios Santana, Residencial Esmeralda del Sur, Residencial Villa Real, Salida hacia Marín, Sector Campito Los Soto, Sector Isidro Ruíz, Sector La Felícita, Sector La Línea, Sector La Patilla, Sector Los Barros, Sector Los Tres Puntos, Sector Mamey Chiquito, Sector Marín Alto, Sector Marín Bajo, Sector Matadero, Urbanización Brisas de la Esmeralda, Urbanización El Paraíso, Urbanización Remanso, Urbanización San José, Urbanización Valle Alto, and Urbanización Valles de Patillas.

== See also ==
- List of communities in Puerto Rico
- List of barrios and sectors of Patillas, Puerto Rico
