= Cerro Gordo, San Lorenzo, Puerto Rico =

Barrio of Puerto Rico

Cerro Gordo
- Barrio
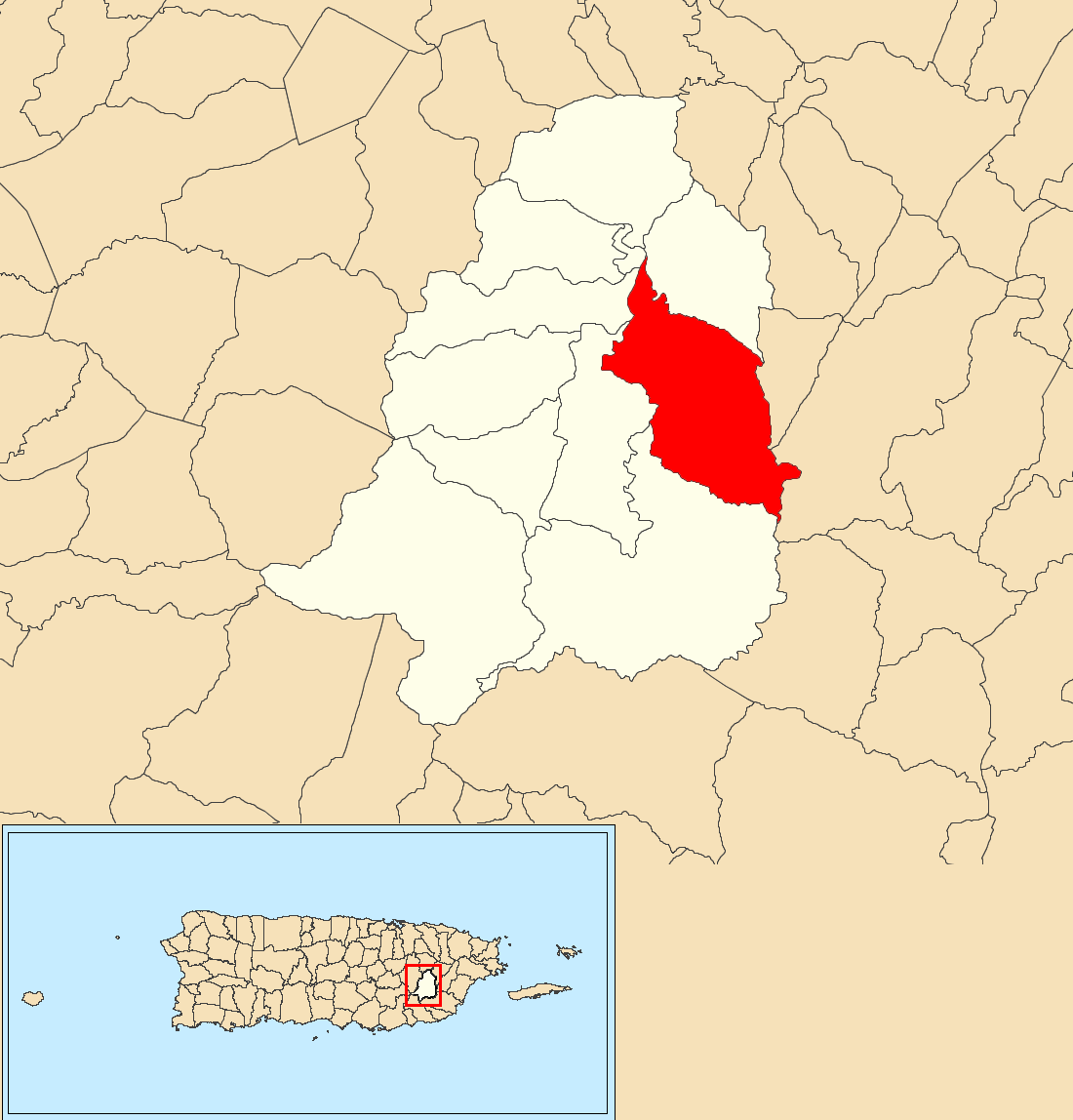
- Location of Cerro Gordo within the municipality of San Lorenzo shown in red

- Location of Puerto Rico
- Coordinates: 18°09′18″N 65°56′46″W
- Commonwealth: Puerto Rico
- Municipality: San Lorenzo

Area
  - Total: 6.16 sq mi (16.0 km^{2})
  - Land: 6.15 sq mi (15.9 km^{2})
  - Water: 0.01 sq mi (0.026 km^{2})
- Elevation: 584 ft (178 m)

Population (2010)
  - Total: 5,284
  - Density: 859.2/sq mi (331.7/km^{2})
- Source: 2010 Census
- Time zone: UTC−4 (AST)
- ZIP Code: 00754
- Area code: 787/939

Cerro Gordo is a barrio in the municipality of San Lorenzo, Puerto Rico. Its population in 2010 was 5,284.

== History ==
Cerro Gordo was in Spain's gazetteers until Puerto Rico was ceded by Spain in the aftermath of the Spanish–American War under the terms of the Treaty of Paris of 1898 and became an unincorporated territory of the United States. In 1899, the United States Department of War conducted a census of Puerto Rico finding that the population of Cerro Gordo barrio was 1,452.

Historical population
| Census | Pop. | Note | %± |
|---|---|---|---|
| 1900 | 1,452 | | — |
| 1910 | 1,840 | | 26.7% |
| 1920 | 2,061 | | 12.0% |
| 1930 | 2,335 | | 13.3% |
| 1940 | 2,689 | | 15.2% |
| 1950 | 3,073 | | 14.3% |
| 1960 | 2,752 | | −10.4% |
| 1970 | 2,327 | | −15.4% |
| 1980 | 3,395 | | 45.9% |
| 1990 | 3,857 | | 13.6% |
| 2000 | 4,400 | | 14.1% |
| 2010 | 5,284 | | 20.1% |
U.S. Decennial Census; 1899 (shown as 1900) 1910-1930; 1930-1950 1980-2000 2010

== Sectors ==
Barrios (which are, in contemporary times, roughly comparable to minor civil divisions) in turn are further subdivided into smaller local populated place areas/units called sectores (sectors in English). The types of sectores may vary, from normally sector to urbanización to reparto to barriada to residencial, among others.

The following sectors are in Cerro Gordo barrio:

Anexo Urbanización Jardines de Cerro Gordo, Camino Francisco Loiz, Camino Geño Rosario, Camino Juan Dulia, Camino Sueño Realizado, Camino Tensio Nieves, Condominio Alondra, Residencial Villas de San Lorenzo, Sector Acueducto Abajo, Sector Almeda, Sector Alverio, Sector Bone Santa, Sector Campo Flores, Sector Carmelita Zayas, Sector Carrasquillo, Sector Fermín Santiago, Sector Hoyo Hondo, Sector Josefa Domínguez, Sector La Marina, Sector Laí, Sector Los Velázquez, Sector Miguel Sánchez, Sector Nato Dávila, Sector Orozco, Sector Pedro Power, Sector Piedra Gorda, Sector Roldán, Sector Rosado, Sector Tesoro Escondido, Sector Velázquez, Urbanización Alturas de San Lorenzo, Urbanización Bosque Llano, Urbanización Hacienda Cerro Gordo, Urbanización Jardines de Cerro Gordo, Urbanización Monte Rey, and Urbanización Paseos de las Flores.

== See also ==
- List of communities in Puerto Rico
- List of barrios and sectors of San Lorenzo, Puerto Rico
