= Florida, San Lorenzo, Puerto Rico =

Barrio of Puerto Rico

Florida
- Barrio
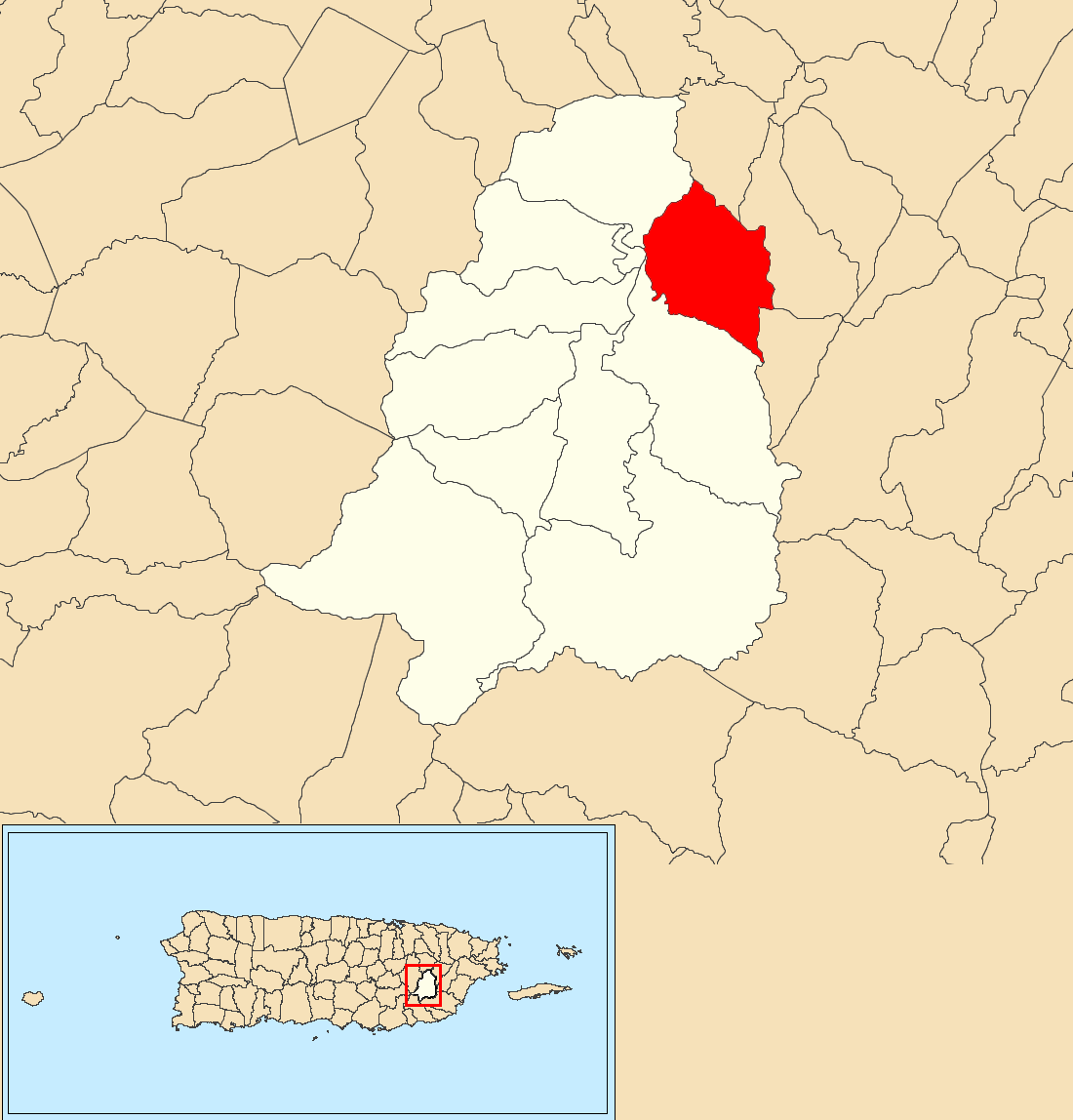
- Location of Florida within the municipality of San Lorenzo shown in red

- Location of Puerto Rico
- Coordinates: 18°11′07″N 65°56′41″W
- Commonwealth: Puerto Rico
- Municipality: San Lorenzo

Area
  - Total: 3.67 sq mi (9.5 km^{2})
  - Land: 3.64 sq mi (9.4 km^{2})
  - Water: 0.03 sq mi (0.078 km^{2})
- Elevation: 430 ft (130 m)

Population (2010)
  - Total: 5,293
  - Density: 1,454.1/sq mi (561.4/km^{2})
- Source: 2010 Census
- Time zone: UTC−4 (AST)
- ZIP Code: 00754
- Area code: 787/939

Florida is a barrio in the municipality of San Lorenzo, Puerto Rico. Its population in 2010 was 5,293.

== History ==
Florida was in Spain's gazetteers until Puerto Rico was ceded by Spain in the aftermath of the Spanish–American War under the terms of the Treaty of Paris of 1898 and became an unincorporated territory of the United States. In 1899, the United States Department of War conducted a census of Puerto Rico finding that the population of Florida barrio was 807.

Historical population
Census	Pop.	Note	%±
1900	807		—
1910	799		−1.0%
1920	1,111		39.0%
1930	1,625		46.3%
1940	1,763		8.5%
1950	1,899		7.7%
1960	1,561		−17.8%
1970	1,473		−5.6%
1980	3,743		154.1%
1990	5,091		36.0%
2000	5,791		13.7%
2010	5,293		−8.6%
U.S. Decennial Census; 1899 (shown as 1900) 1910-1930; 1930-1950 1980-2000 2010

== Sectors ==
Barrios (which are, in contemporary times, roughly comparable to minor civil divisions) in turn are further subdivided into smaller local populated place areas/units called sectores (sectors in English). The types of sectores may vary, from normal sector to urbanización to reparto to barriada to residencial, among others.

The following sectors are in Florida barrio:

Camino Joaquín Corona, Camino Pedro Borges, Ramal 9929, Residencial Villas de San Lorenzo, Sector Acosta, Sector Artiri, Sector Arturo Hernández, Sector Camino Viejo, Sector Cendito Torres, Sector Contreras (Carretera 183), Sector Contreras (Carretera 9929), Sector Cuatro Calles, Sector El Chaparral, Sector El Coco, Sector Fernández, Sector González, Sector Hacienda Mi Sueño, Sector Las Cumbres, Sector Los Amigos, Sector Los Astacio, Sector Los Calderón, Sector Los Flores, Sector Los Gómez, Sector Los Mameyes, Sector Los Paganes, Sector Los Reyes, Sector Miguel Sánchez, Sector Montañez, Sector Pedraza, Sector Pérez, Sector Rafael Colón, Sector Terrazas de Florida, Sector Tito Morales, Sector Zarzal, Urbanización Alejandra Valley, Urbanización Ciudad Massó, Urbanización Florida Garden, Urbanización Hacienda Florida, and Urbanización Los Flamboyanes.

== See also ==
- List of communities in Puerto Rico
- List of barrios and sectors of San Lorenzo, Puerto Rico
