= Quemados, San Lorenzo, Puerto Rico =

Barrio of Puerto Rico

Quemados
- Barrio
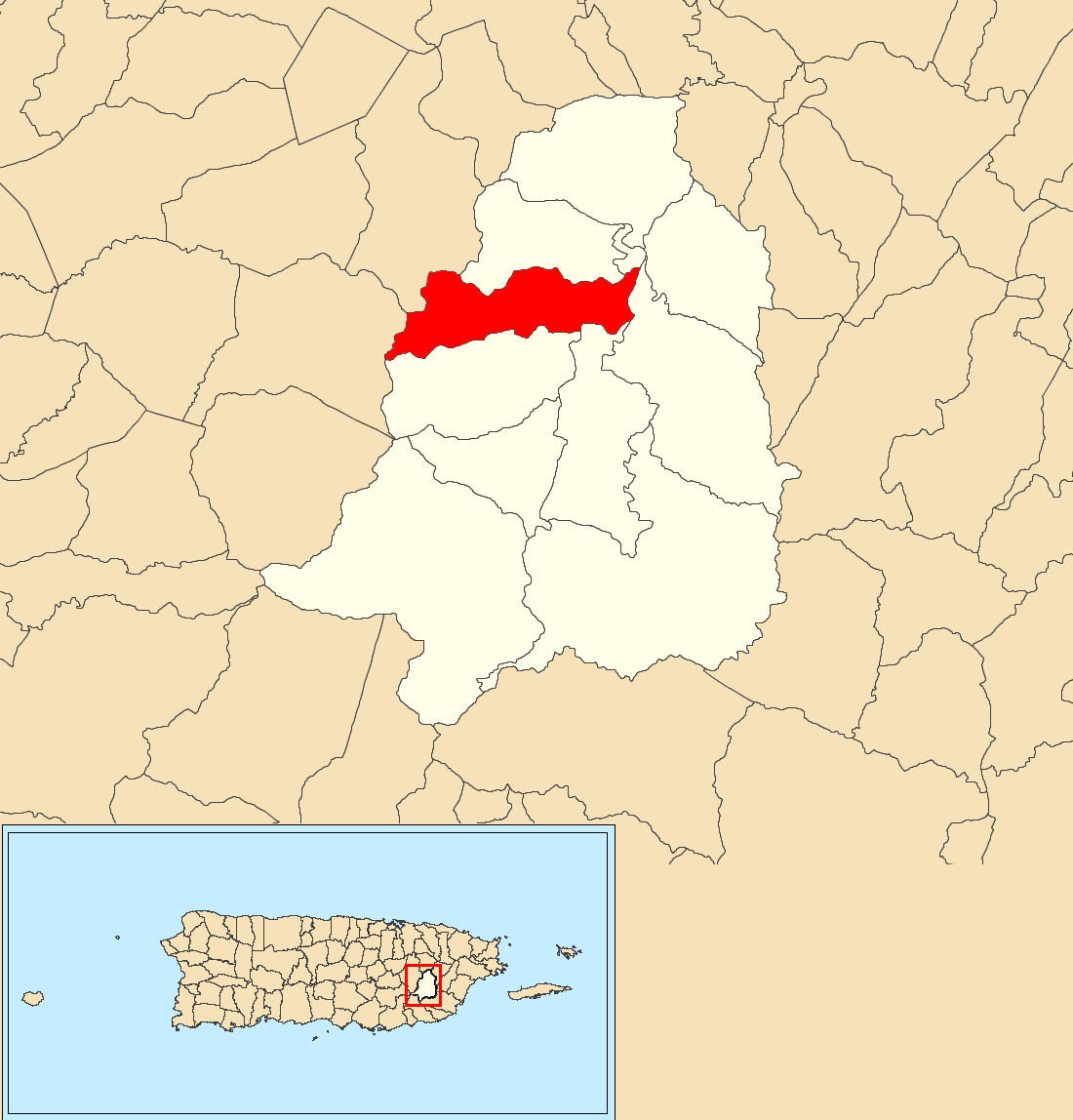
- Location of Quemados within the municipality of San Lorenzo shown in red

- Location of Puerto Rico
- Coordinates: 18°10′46″N 65°59′29″W
- Commonwealth: Puerto Rico
- Municipality: San Lorenzo

Area
  - Total: 3.45 sq mi (8.9 km^{2})
  - Land: 3.45 sq mi (8.9 km^{2})
  - Water: 0 sq mi (0 km^{2})
- Elevation: 456 ft (139 m)

Population (2010)
  - Total: 4,712
  - Density: 1,365.8/sq mi (527.3/km^{2})
- Source: 2010 Census
- Time zone: UTC−4 (AST)
- ZIP Code: 00754
- Area code: 787/939

Quemados is a barrio in the municipality of San Lorenzo, Puerto Rico. Its population in 2010 was 4,712.

== History ==
Quemados was in Spain's gazetteers until Puerto Rico was ceded by Spain in the aftermath of the Spanish–American War under the terms of the Treaty of Paris of 1898 and became an unincorporated territory of the United States. In 1899, the United States Department of War conducted a census of Puerto Rico finding that the population of Quemados barrio was 1,255.

Historical population
Census	Pop.	Note	%±
1900	1,255		—
1910	1,069		−14.8%
1920	1,443		35.0%
1930	1,703		18.0%
1940	1,770		3.9%
1950	1,611		−9.0%
1960	1,724		7.0%
1970	0		−100.0%
1980	2,928		—
1990	3,331		13.8%
2000	4,771		43.2%
2010	4,712		−1.2%
U.S. Decennial Census; 1899 (shown as 1900) 1910-1930; 1930-1950 1980-2000 2010

== Sectors ==
Barrios (which are, in contemporary times, roughly comparable to minor civil divisions) in turn are further subdivided into smaller local populated place areas/units called sectores (sectors in English). The types of sectores may vary, from normally sector to urbanización to reparto to barriada to residencial, among others.

The following sectors are in Quemados barrio:

Camino Eliasim López, Camino Juan Flores, Camino Julio Morales, Camino Loma Linda, Comunidad Sunny Hills, Sector Brisas del Monte, Sector Buenos Aires, Sector Cáez, Sector Capilla, Sector Carlos Flores, Sector Carrasco, Sector Cruces, Sector Final, Sector Las Colinas, Sector Los Adorno, Sector Muñoz, Sector Neris, Sector Pachín, Sector Pané, Sector Parcelas Quemados, Sector Quemado Arriba, Sector Roldán, Sector Salvatierra, Sector Santiago, Sector Valles de Oasis, Sector Vicente Pedraza, Sector Vista San Felipe, Urbanización Las Colinas, Urbanización Monte Verde, Urbanización Paseos de San Lorenzo, and Urbanización Salvatierra.

== See also ==
- List of communities in Puerto Rico
- List of barrios and sectors of San Lorenzo, Puerto Rico
