= Cayaguas, San Lorenzo, Puerto Rico =

Barrio of Puerto Rico

Cayaguas
- Barrio
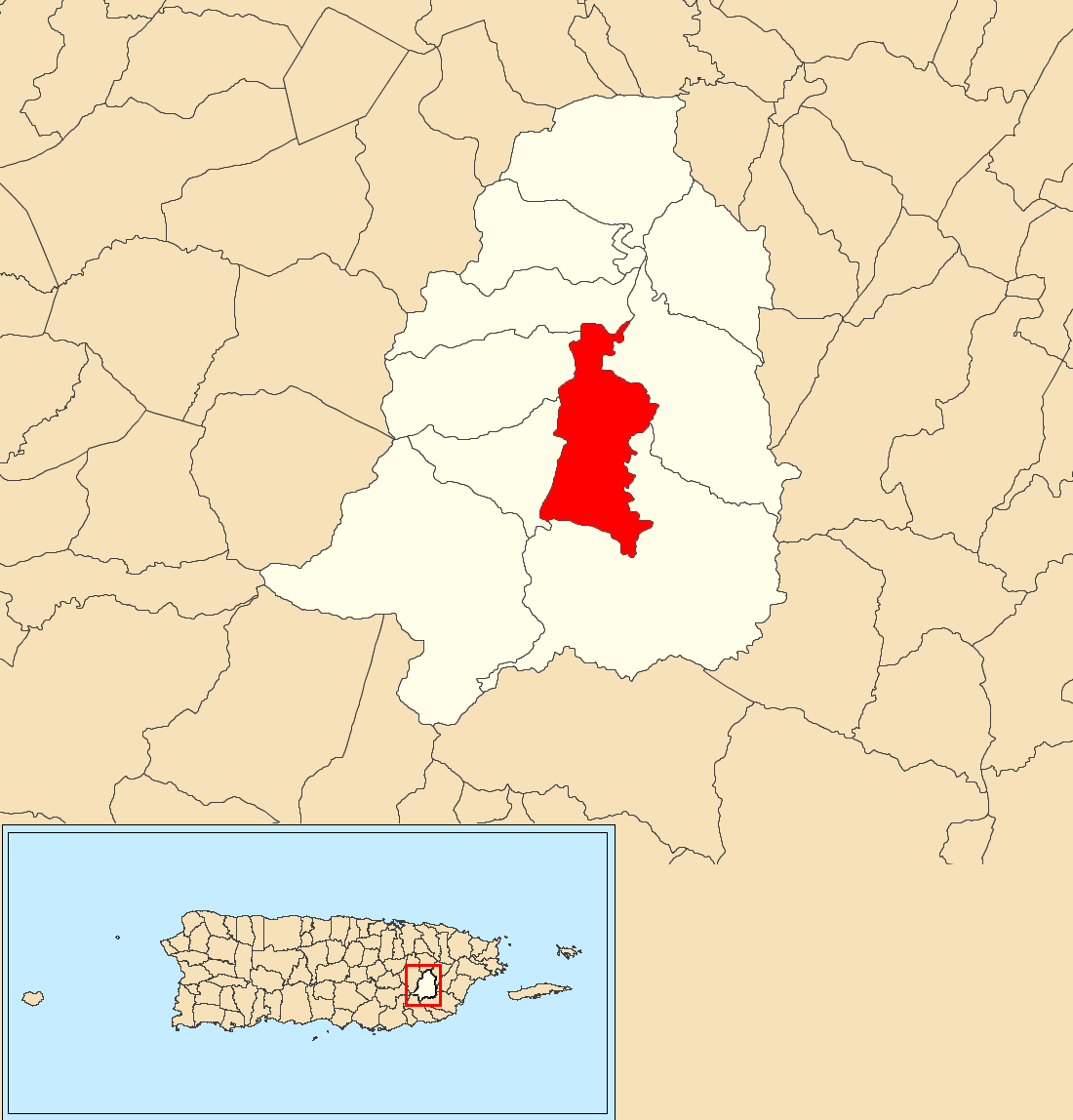
- Location of Cayaguas within the municipality of San Lorenzo shown in red

- Location of Puerto Rico
- Coordinates: 18°08′40″N 65°58′20″W
- Commonwealth: Puerto Rico
- Municipality: San Lorenzo

Area
  - Total: 3.96 sq mi (10.3 km^{2})
  - Land: 3.96 sq mi (10.3 km^{2})
  - Water: 0 sq mi (0 km^{2})
- Elevation: 627 ft (191 m)

Population (2010)
  - Total: 1,682
  - Density: 425.8/sq mi (164.4/km^{2})
- Source: 2010 Census
- Time zone: UTC−4 (AST)
- ZIP Code: 00754
- Area code: 787/939

Cayaguas is a barrio in the municipality of San Lorenzo, Puerto Rico. Its population in 2010 was 1,682.

Historical population
Census	Pop.	Note	%±
1910	710		—
1920	1,000		40.8%
1930	1,231		23.1%
1940	1,277		3.7%
1950	1,497		17.2%
1960	1,280		−14.5%
1970	838		−34.5%
1980	1,097		30.9%
1990	1,246		13.6%
2000	1,394		11.9%
2010	1,682		20.7%
U.S. Decennial Census; 1900 (N/A) 1910-1930; 1930-1950 1980-2000 2010

== Sectors ==
Barrios (which are, in contemporary times, roughly comparable to minor civil divisions) in turn are further subdivided into smaller local populated place areas/units called sectores (sectors in English). The types of sectores may vary, from normally sector to urbanización to reparto to barriada to residencial, among others.

The following sectors are in Cayaguas barrio:

Camino Carlos Colón, Camino Esperanza Roldán, Camino Gamalier, Camino Los Rivera, Camino Rivera, Sector Alverio, Sector Capilla, Sector Dávila, Sector La Represa, Sector Los Grillos, Sector Manchurria, Sector Morales, Sector Pablo Muñoz, Sector Piedras Blancas, Sector Rivera, Sector Robles, and Sector Teyo Rodríguez.

== See also ==
- List of communities in Puerto Rico
- List of barrios and sectors of San Lorenzo, Puerto Rico
