= Jagual, San Lorenzo, Puerto Rico =

Barrio of Puerto Rico

Jagual
- Barrio
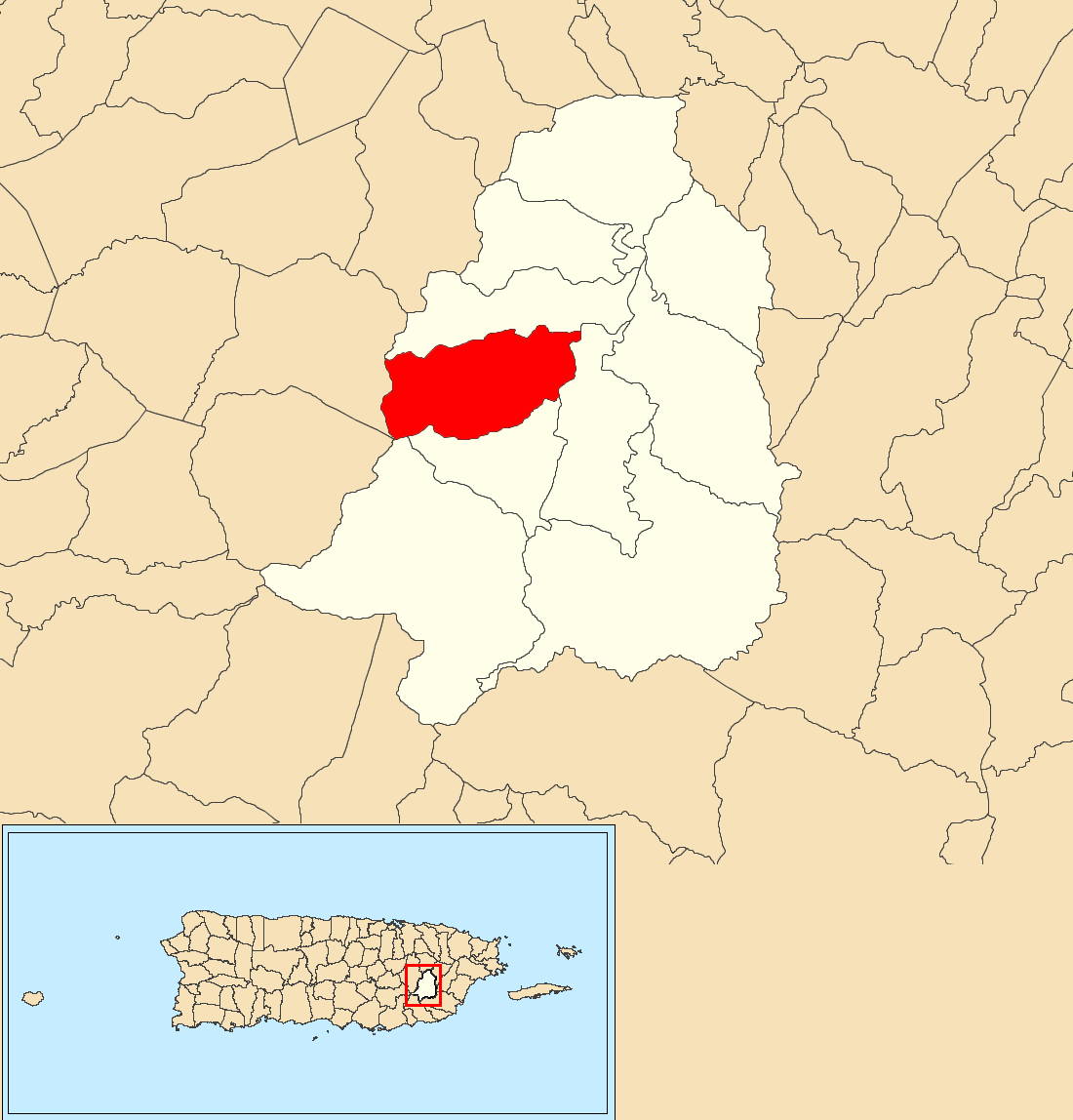
- Location of Jagual within the municipality of San Lorenzo shown in red

- Location of Puerto Rico
- Coordinates: 18°09′10″N 66°00′26″W
- Commonwealth: Puerto Rico
- Municipality: San Lorenzo

Area
  - Total: 4.15 sq mi (10.7 km^{2})
  - Land: 4.15 sq mi (10.7 km^{2})
  - Water: 0 sq mi (0 km^{2})
- Elevation: 682 ft (208 m)

Population (2010)
  - Total: 4,042
  - Density: 974/sq mi (376/km^{2})
- Source: 2010 Census
- Time zone: UTC−4 (AST)
- ZIP Code: 00754
- Area code: 787/939

Jagual is a barrio in the municipality of San Lorenzo, Puerto Rico. Its population in 2010 was 4,042.

== History ==
Jagual was in Spain's gazetteers until Puerto Rico was ceded by Spain in the aftermath of the Spanish–American War under the terms of the Treaty of Paris of 1898 and became an unincorporated territory of the United States. In 1899, the United States Department of War conducted a census of Puerto Rico finding that the population of Jagual barrio was 1,024.

Historical population
Census	Pop.	Note	%±
1900	1,024		—
1910	1,159		13.2%
1920	1,193		2.9%
1930	1,788		49.9%
1940	2,223		24.3%
1950	2,408		8.3%
1960	2,347		−2.5%
1970	2,626		11.9%
1980	3,062		16.6%
1990	3,401		11.1%
2000	4,316		26.9%
2010	4,042		−6.3%
U.S. Decennial Census; 1899 (shown as 1900) 1910-1930; 1930-1950 1980-2000 2010

== Sectors ==
Barrios (which are, in contemporary times, roughly comparable to minor civil divisions) in turn are further subdivided into smaller local populated place areas/units called sectores (sectors in English). The types of sectores may vary, from normally sector to urbanización to reparto to barriada to residencial, among others.

The following sectors are in Jagual barrio:

Carretera 181, Comunidad Los Rosales, Parcelas Nuevas, Parcelas Viejas, Sector Acueducto, Sector Badén, Sector Borges, Sector Cantera, Sector Capilla, Sector Carlos Flores, Sector El Cinco, Sector El Salto, Sector García, Sector Juan Flores, Sector La Ceiba, Sector La Loma, Sector Los Díaz, Sector Los González, Sector Melilla, Sector Rabo del Buey, and Sector Vázquez.

== See also ==
- List of communities in Puerto Rico
- List of barrios and sectors of San Lorenzo, Puerto Rico
