= Espino, San Lorenzo, Puerto Rico =

Barrio of Puerto Rico

Espino
- Barrio
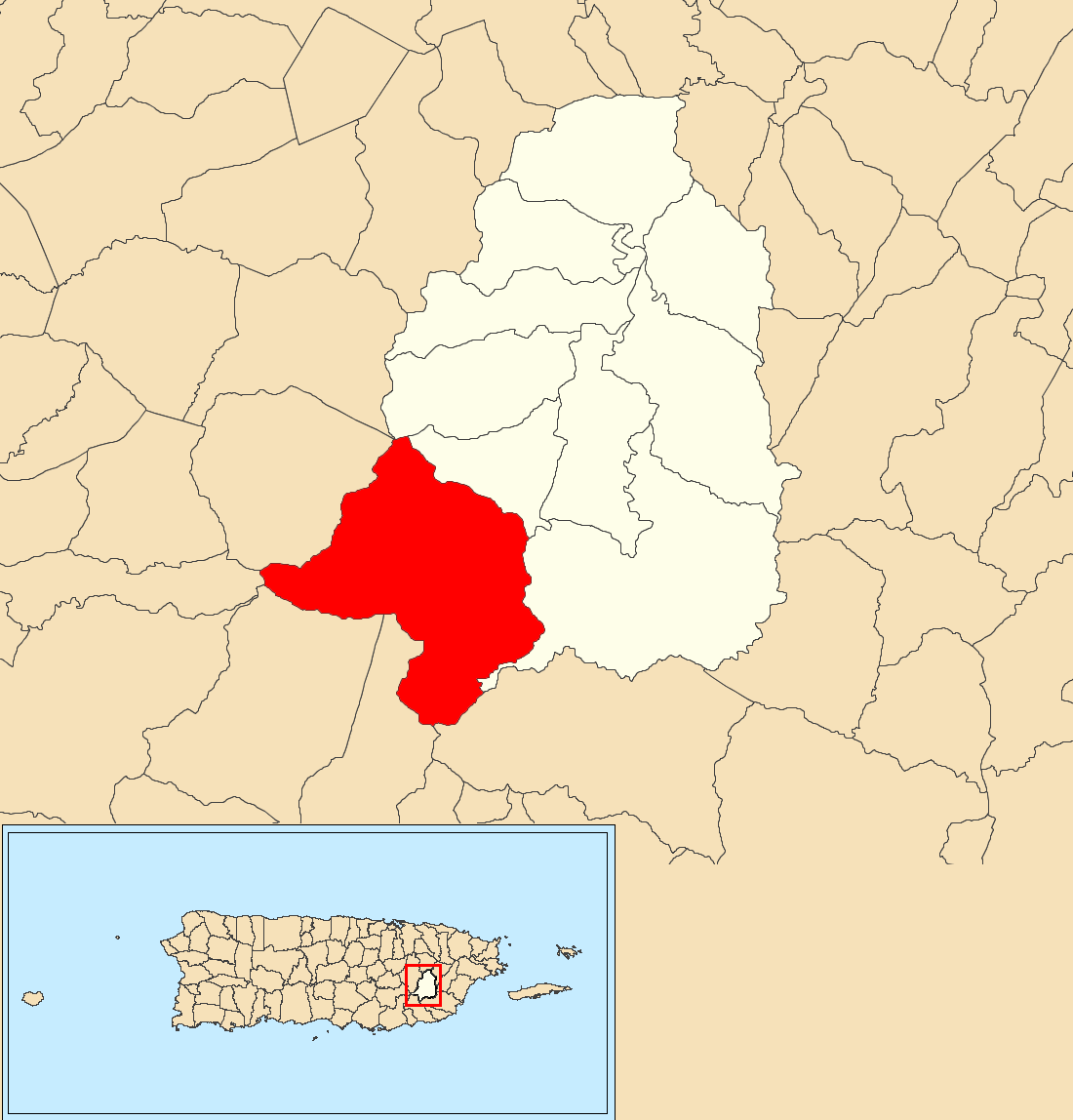
- Location of Espino within the municipality of San Lorenzo shown in red

- Location of Puerto Rico
- Coordinates: 18°06′45″N 66°00′48″W
- Commonwealth: Puerto Rico
- Municipality: San Lorenzo

Area
  - Total: 10.48 sq mi (27.1 km^{2})
  - Land: 10.48 sq mi (27.1 km^{2})
  - Water: 0 sq mi (0 km^{2})
- Elevation: 1,686 ft (514 m)

Population (2010)
  - Total: 3,430
  - Density: 327.3/sq mi (126.4/km^{2})
- Source: 2010 Census
- Time zone: UTC−4 (AST)
- ZIP Code: 00754
- Area code: 787/939

Espino is a barrio in the municipality of San Lorenzo, Puerto Rico. Its population in 2010 was 3,430.

== History ==
Espino was in Spain's gazetteers until Puerto Rico was ceded by Spain in the aftermath of the Spanish–American War under the terms of the Treaty of Paris of 1898 and became an unincorporated territory of the United States. In 1899, the United States Department of War conducted a census of Puerto Rico finding that the population of Espino barrio was 1,522.

Historical population
Census	Pop.	Note	%±
1900	1,522		—
1910	1,612		5.9%
1920	2,109		30.8%
1930	2,563		21.5%
1940	3,273		27.7%
1950	3,472		6.1%
1960	3,104		−10.6%
1970	2,888		−7.0%
1980	2,890		0.1%
1990	3,152		9.1%
2000	3,435		9.0%
2010	3,430		−0.1%
U.S. Decennial Census; 1899 (shown as 1900) 1910-1930; 1930-1950 1980-2000 2010

== Sectors ==
Barrios (which are, in contemporary times, roughly comparable to minor civil divisions) in turn are further subdivided into smaller local populated place areas/units called sectores (sectors in English). The types of sectores may vary, from normally sector to urbanización to reparto to barriada to residencial, among others.

The following sectors are in Espino barrio:

Camino Los Dones, Parcelas Espino, Sector Benny Muñoz, Sector Campo Alegre, Sector Canta Gallo, Sector Capilla o Parroquia, Sector Chole Martínez, Sector El Flaco, Sector Felipe Colón, Sector Goyo Rosario, Sector Hilario Pérez, Sector La Providencia, Sector La Quinta, Sector La Selecta, Sector Morena, Sector Nelson Rodríguez, Sector Quebrada Lajas, and Sector Villa Lili.

== See also ==
- List of communities in Puerto Rico
- List of barrios and sectors of San Lorenzo, Puerto Rico
