= Hato, San Lorenzo, Puerto Rico =

Barrio of Puerto Rico

Hato
- Barrio
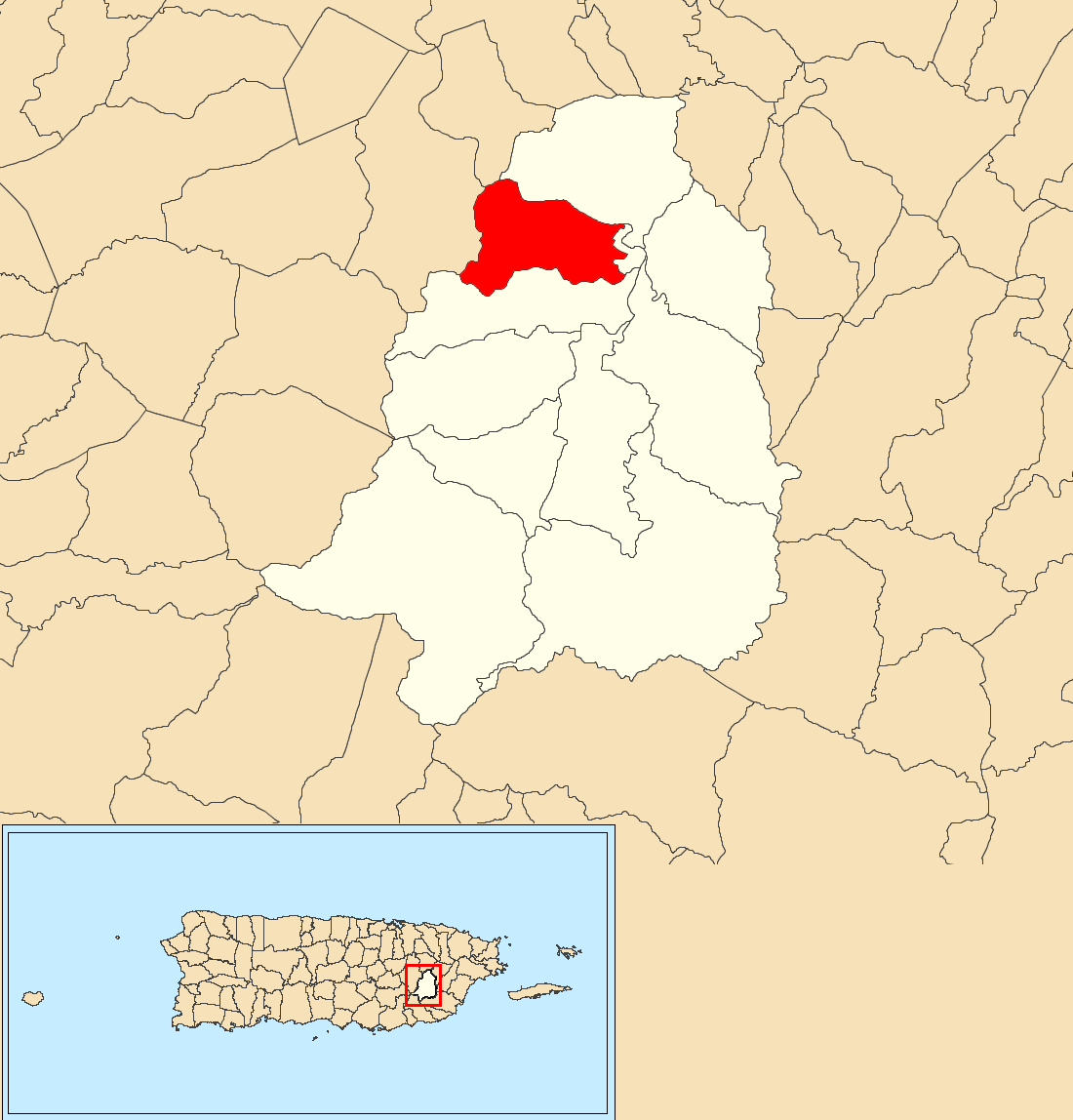
- Location of Hato within the municipality of San Lorenzo shown in red

- Location of Puerto Rico
- Coordinates: 18°11′50″N 65°58′56″W
- Commonwealth: Puerto Rico
- Municipality: San Lorenzo

Area
  - Total: 3.00 sq mi (7.8 km^{2})
  - Land: 2.98 sq mi (7.7 km^{2})
  - Water: 0.02 sq mi (0.052 km^{2})
- Elevation: 699 ft (213 m)

Population (2010)
  - Total: 6,945
  - Density: 2,330.5/sq mi (899.8/km^{2})
- Source: 2010 Census
- Time zone: UTC−4 (AST)
- ZIP Code: 00754
- Area code: 787/939

Hato is a barrio in the municipality of San Lorenzo, Puerto Rico. Its population in 2010 was 6,945.

== History ==
Hato was in Spain's gazetteers until Puerto Rico was ceded by Spain in the aftermath of the Spanish–American War under the terms of the Treaty of Paris of 1898 and became an unincorporated territory of the United States. In 1899, the United States Department of War conducted a census of Puerto Rico finding that the population of Hato barrio was 1,028.

Historical population
Census	Pop.	Note	%±
1900	1,028		—
1910	1,033		0.5%
1920	1,334		29.1%
1930	1,611		20.8%
1940	1,790		11.1%
1950	1,669		−6.8%
1960	3,773		126.1%
1970	0		−100.0%
1980	3,971		—
1990	6,500		63.7%
2000	7,109		9.4%
2010	6,945		−2.3%
U.S. Decennial Census; 1899 (shown as 1900) 1910-1930; 1930-1950 1980-2000 2010

== Sectors ==
Barrios (which are, in contemporary times, roughly comparable to minor civil divisions) in turn are further subdivided into smaller local populated place areas/units called sectores (sectors in English). The types of sectores may vary, from normally sector to urbanización to reparto to barriada to residencial, among others.

The following sectors are in Hato barrio:

Apartamentos Urbanización Valentina, Camino Cholo Serrano, Camino Esperanza Ramos, Camino Julio Delgado, Camino Los Claudio, Extensión Tamarindos, Haciendas de San Lorenzo, Parcelas Hato, Residencial Lorenzana, Sector Buxó, Sector Cáez, Sector Capilla, Sector Carfeli, Sector Cuchilla, Sector Federico Delgado, Sector Hernández, Sector La Loma, Sector Los Adorno , Sector Montañez, Sector Muñoz, Sector Neris, Sector Oquendo, Sector Rosa, Sector Sánchez , Sector Santiago, Sector Solares Monzón, Sector Zavala, Tramo Carretera 183, Urbanización Aponte y Sellés, Urbanización Camino de las Flores, Urbanización Carfeli, Urbanización El Parque (Santa Clara), Urbanización Estancias de San Lorenzo (Avenida Mariano Olalla), Urbanización Los Caminos, Urbanización Muñoz Marín, Urbanización Portal del Sol, Urbanización Ramos Antonini, Urbanización San Lorenzo, Urbanización San Lorenzo Valley, Urbanización Tamarindos, Urbanización Villas del Hato, Urbanización Vistas de San Lorenzo, and Urbanización y Extensión Roosevelt.

== See also ==
- List of communities in Puerto Rico
- List of barrios and sectors of San Lorenzo, Puerto Rico
