= Quebrada Arenas, San Lorenzo, Puerto Rico =

Barrio of Puerto Rico

Quebrada Arenas
- Barrio
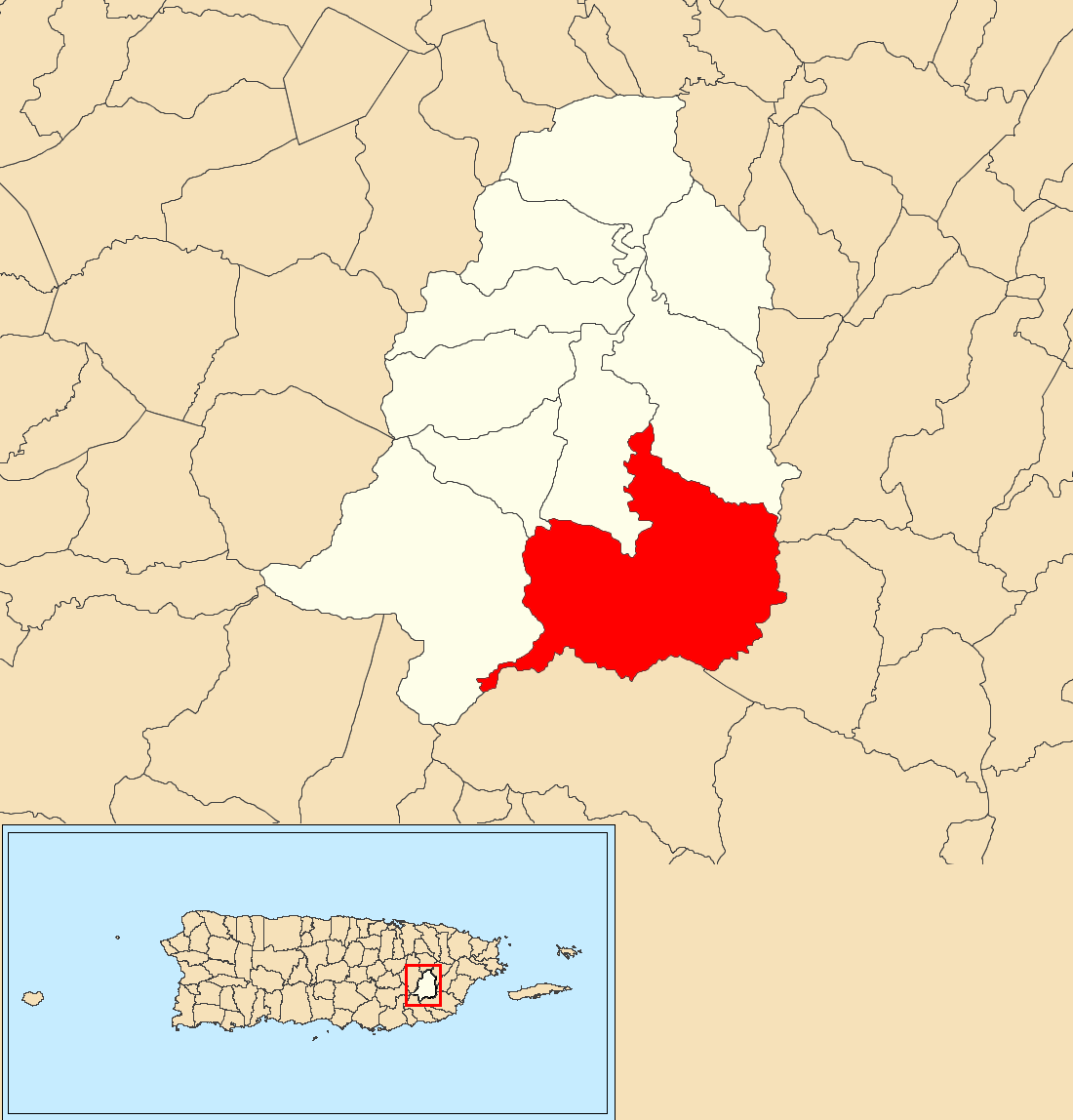
- Location of Quebrada Arenas within the municipality of San Lorenzo shown in red

- Location of Puerto Rico
- Coordinates: 18°06′40″N 65°57′29″W
- Commonwealth: Puerto Rico
- Municipality: San Lorenzo

Area
  - Total: 10.51 sq mi (27.2 km^{2})
  - Land: 10.51 sq mi (27.2 km^{2})
  - Water: 0 sq mi (0 km^{2})
- Elevation: 951 ft (290 m)

Population (2010)
  - Total: 2,390
  - Density: 227.4/sq mi (87.8/km^{2})
- Source: 2010 Census
- Time zone: UTC−4 (AST)
- ZIP Code: 00754
- Area code: 787/939

Quebrada Arenas is a barrio in the municipality of San Lorenzo, Puerto Rico. Its population in 2010 was 2,390.

== History ==
Quebrada Arenas was in Spain's gazetteers until Puerto Rico was ceded by Spain in the aftermath of the Spanish–American War under the terms of the Treaty of Paris of 1898 and became an unincorporated territory of the United States. In 1899, the United States Department of War conducted a census of Puerto Rico finding that the population of Quebrada Arenas barrio was 1,452.

Historical population
Census	Pop.	Note	%±
1900	1,452		—
1910	1,645		13.3%
1920	2,171		32.0%
1930	2,814		29.6%
1940	3,108		10.4%
1950	3,459		11.3%
1960	2,757		−20.3%
1970	2,144		−22.2%
1980	1,965		−8.3%
1990	2,191		11.5%
2000	2,751		25.6%
2010	2,390		−13.1%
U.S. Decennial Census; 1899 (shown as 1900) 1910-1930; 1930-1950 1980-2000 2010

== Sectors ==
Barrios (which are, in contemporary times, roughly comparable to minor civil divisions) in turn are further subdivided into smaller local populated place areas/units called sectores (sectors in English). The types of sectores may vary, from normally sector to urbanización to reparto to barriada to residencial, among others.

The following sectors are in Quebrada Arenas barrio:

Camino Pellín Claudio, Sector Acueducto, Sector Blanca Blanco, Sector Cáez o Santana, Sector Carmelo Figueroa, Sector Cayo Félix, Sector Cruz Gómez, Sector Gerardo Villafañe, Sector Jacobo Pérez, Sector Lencho Flores, Sector Lorenzo del Valle, Sector Los Gómez, Sector Los Guábaros, Sector María Hernández, Sector Miguel Angel Aponte, Sector Ortiz, Sector Río Playita o Sector Capilla, and Sector Ventura Martínez.

== See also ==
- List of communities in Puerto Rico
- List of barrios and sectors of San Lorenzo, Puerto Rico
