= Quebrada Honda, San Lorenzo, Puerto Rico =

Barrio of Puerto Rico

Quebrada Honda
- Barrio
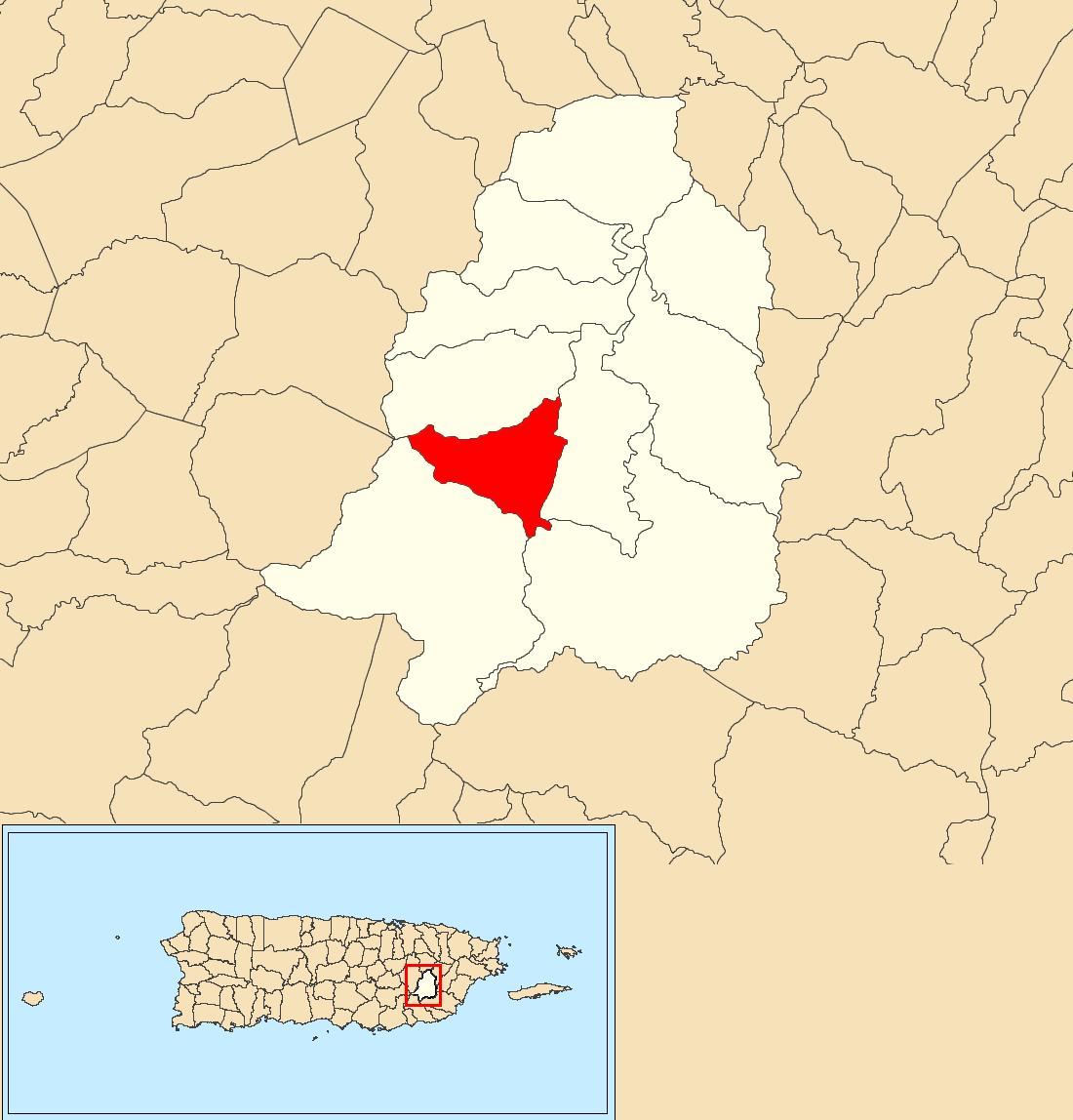
- Location of Quebrada Honda within the municipality of San Lorenzo shown in red

- Location of Puerto Rico
- Coordinates: 18°08′46″N 65°59′42″W
- Commonwealth: Puerto Rico
- Municipality: San Lorenzo

Area
  - Total: 2.68 sq mi (6.9 km^{2})
  - Land: 2.68 sq mi (6.9 km^{2})
  - Water: 0 sq mi (0 km^{2})
- Elevation: 659 ft (201 m)

Population (2010)
  - Total: 1,881
  - Density: 701.9/sq mi (271.0/km^{2})
- Source: 2010 Census
- Time zone: UTC−4 (AST)
- ZIP Code: 00754
- Area code: 787/939

Quebrada Honda is a barrio in the municipality of San Lorenzo, Puerto Rico. Its population in 2010 was 1,881.

== History ==
Quebrada Honda was in Spain's gazetteers until Puerto Rico was ceded by Spain in the aftermath of the Spanish–American War under the terms of the Treaty of Paris of 1898 and became an unincorporated territory of the United States. In 1899, the United States Department of War conducted a census of Puerto Rico finding that the population of Quebrada Honda barrio was 1,616.

Historical population
Census	Pop.	Note	%±
1900	1,616		—
1910	829		−48.7%
1920	1,041		25.6%
1930	1,385		33.0%
1940	1,856		34.0%
1950	2,145		15.6%
1960	2,089		−2.6%
1970	1,988		−4.8%
1980	2,118		6.5%
1990	2,069		−2.3%
2000	2,309		11.6%
2010	1,881		−18.5%
U.S. Decennial Census; 1899 (shown as 1900) 1910-1930; 1930-1950 1980-2000 2010

== Sectors ==
Barrios (which are, in contemporary times, roughly comparable to minor civil divisions) in turn are further subdivided into smaller local populated place areas/units called sectores (sectors in English). The types of sectores may vary, from normally sector to urbanización to reparto to barriada to residencial, among others.

The following sectors are in Quebrada Honda barrio:

Camino Pedro Serrano, Sector Arroyo, Sector Capilla o Parroquia, Sector Cubuy, Sector Huertas, Sector Gallera, Sector García, Sector La Loma, Sector López, Sector Mojica, Sector Pia Colón, Sector Puerto Moyett, Sector Rodríguez, and Sector Vicéns.

== See also ==
- List of communities in Puerto Rico
- List of barrios and sectors of San Lorenzo, Puerto Rico
