= San Lorenzo, Puerto Rico =

Town and municipality in Puerto Rico

San Lorenzo Municipio Autónomo de San Lorenzo
- Town and Municipality
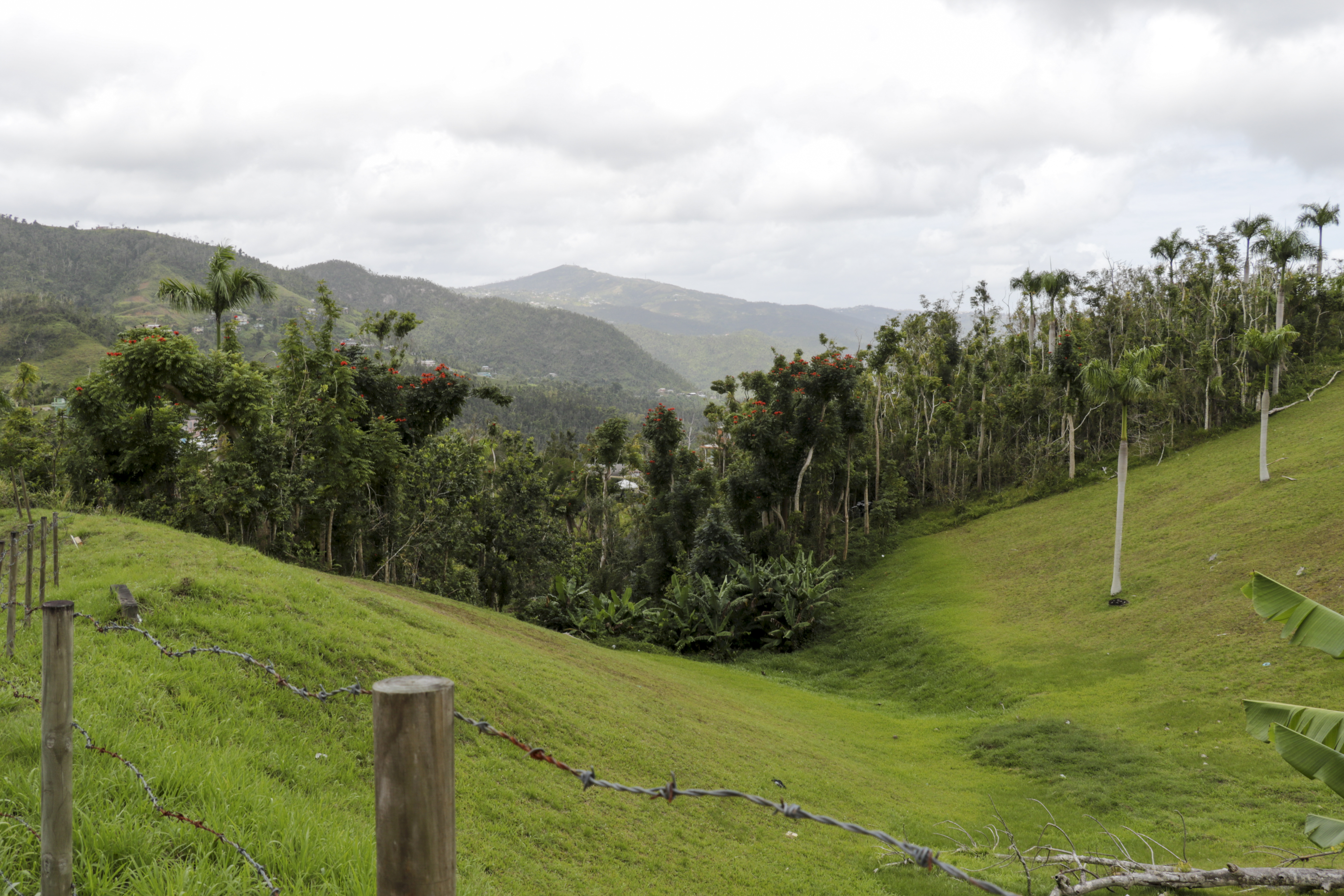
- Hills and valleys in San Lorenzo

- Flag Coat of arms
- Nicknames: "Pueblo de Los Samaritanos", ("Town of Samaritans"), "La Tierra de Leyendas", ("Land of Legends")
- Anthem: "Son tus campos de bellísimo verdor"
- Map of Puerto Rico highlighting San Lorenzo Municipality
- Coordinates: 18°11′24″N 65°58′7″W
- Sovereign state: United States
- Commonwealth: Puerto Rico
- Settled: 1811
- Founded: September 18, 1894
- Founder: Valeriano Muñoz de Oneca
- Named for: Saint Lawrence
- Barrios: 11 barrios: Cayaguas; Cerro Gordo; Espino; Florida; Hato; Jagual; Quebrada; Quebrada Arenas; Quebrada Honda; Quemados; San Lorenzo barrio-pueblo

Government
  - Mayor: Jaime Alverio Ramos (PNP)
  - Senatorial dist.: 7 - Humacao
  - Representative dist.: 33

Area
  - Total: 53.31 sq mi (138.07 km^{2})
  - Land: 53 sq mi (138 km^{2})
  - Water: 0.027 sq mi (0.07 km^{2}) 0%

Population (2020)
  - Total: 37,693
  - Estimate (2025): 37,275 ▼
  - Rank: 27th in Puerto Rico
  - Density: 707/sq mi (273/km^{2})
- Demonym: Sanlorenceños
- Time zone: UTC−4 (AST)
- ZIP Code: 00754
- Area code: 787/939

San Lorenzo (Spanish pronunciation: [san loˈɾenso], locally [ˌsaŋ loˈɾeŋso]; Spanish for "Saint Lawrence") is a town and municipality of Puerto Rico located in the eastern central region, north of Patillas and Yabucoa; south of Gurabo; east of Caguas and Cayey; and west of Juncos and Las Piedras. San Lorenzo is spread over twelve barrios and San Lorenzo Pueblo (the downtown area and the administrative center of the city). It is part of the San Juan-Caguas-Guaynabo Metropolitan Statistical Area.

San Lorenzo is called "The town of the Samaritans" and "Land of Legends." The patron of the municipality is Nuestra Señora de las Mercedes (Our Lady of Mercedes). The surrounding areas produce tobacco and sugar cane.

== History ==
According to Cayetano Coll y Toste, a Puerto Rican historian, San Lorenzo was founded in 1811, and its original name was San Miguel de Hato Grande.

Hurricane Maria on September 20, 2017 triggered numerous landslides in San Lorenzo with the significant amount of rainfall.

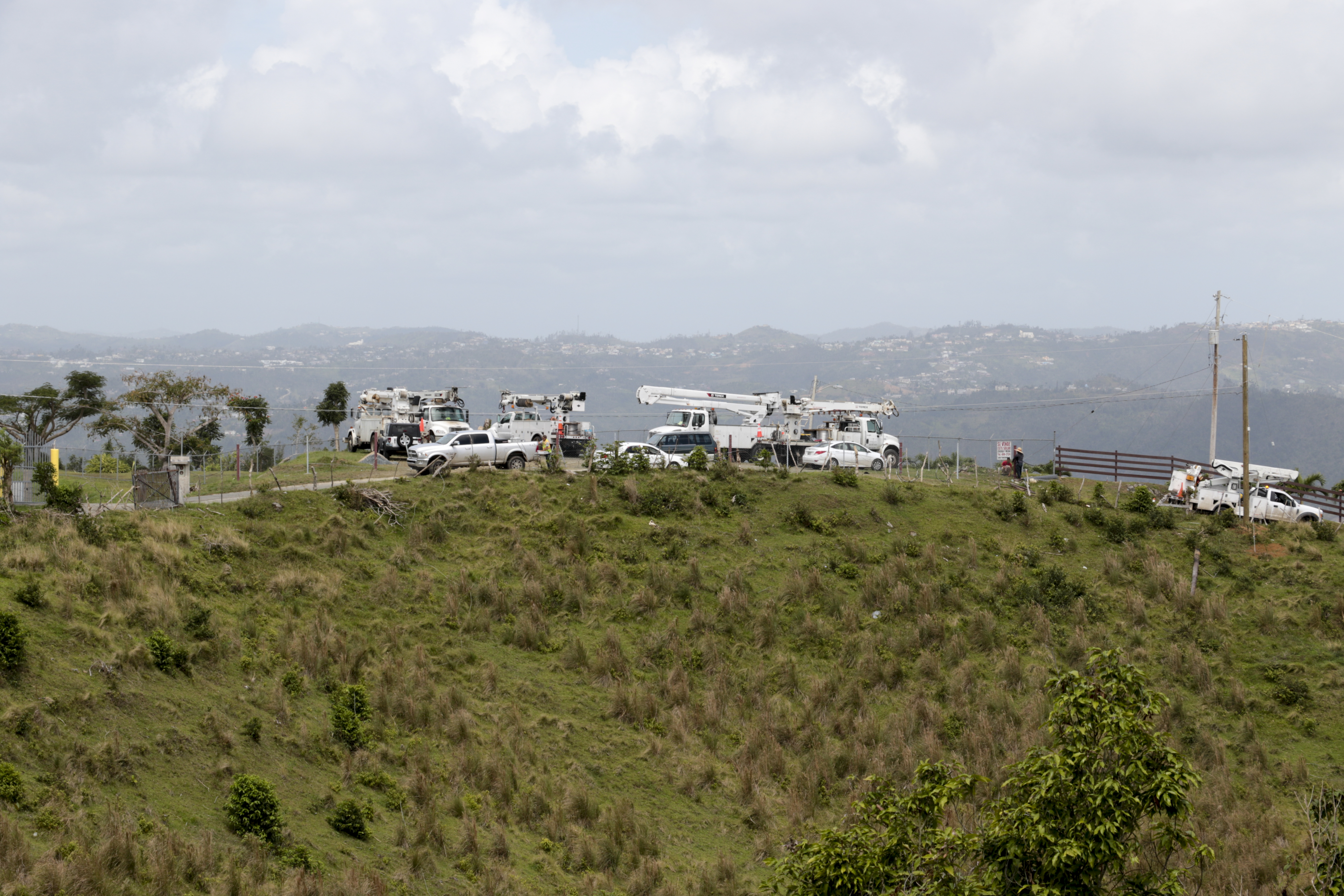
South Atlantic Division (SAD) USACE in San Lorenzo

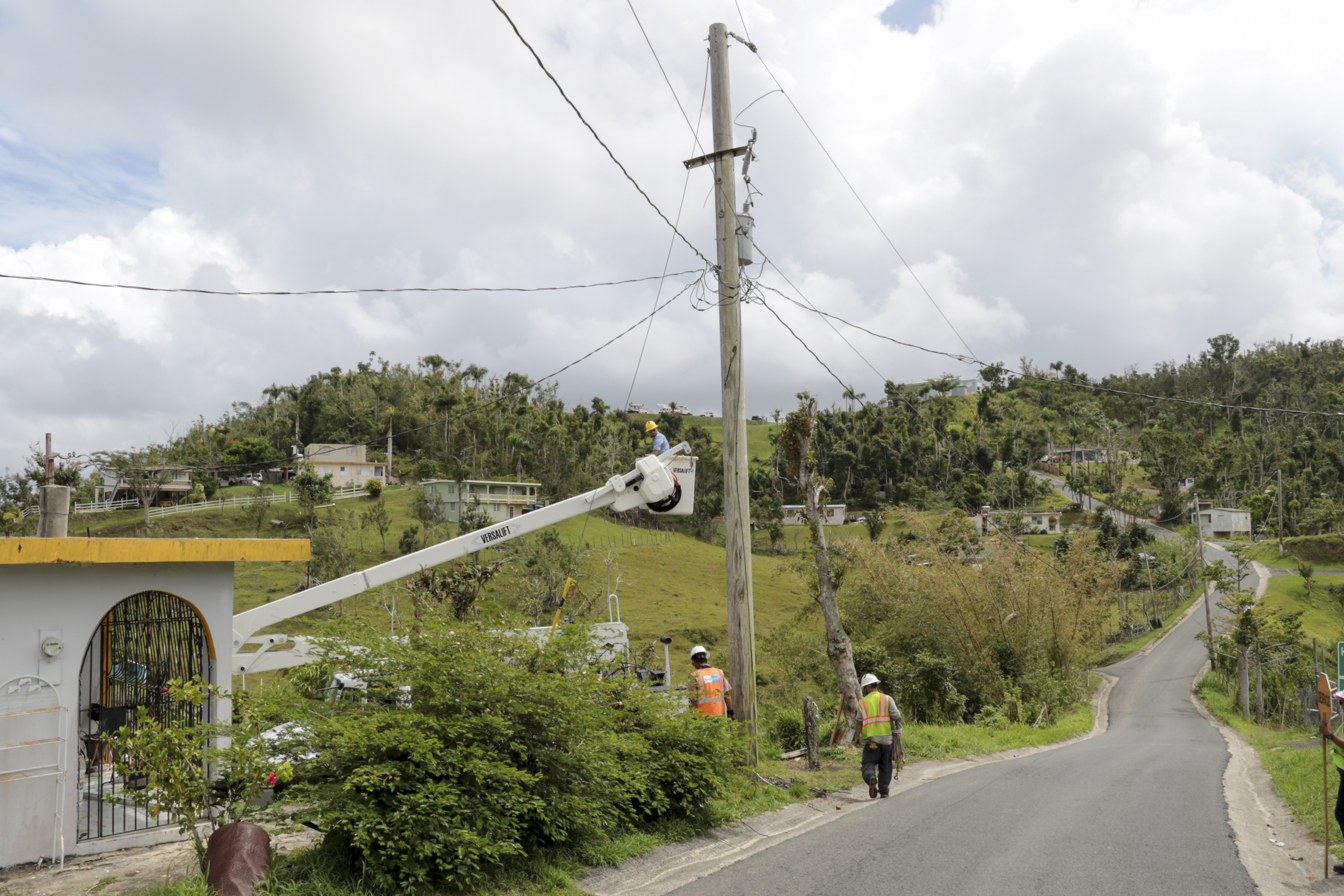
USACE working to restore power in San Lorenzo, 7 months after Hurricane Maria

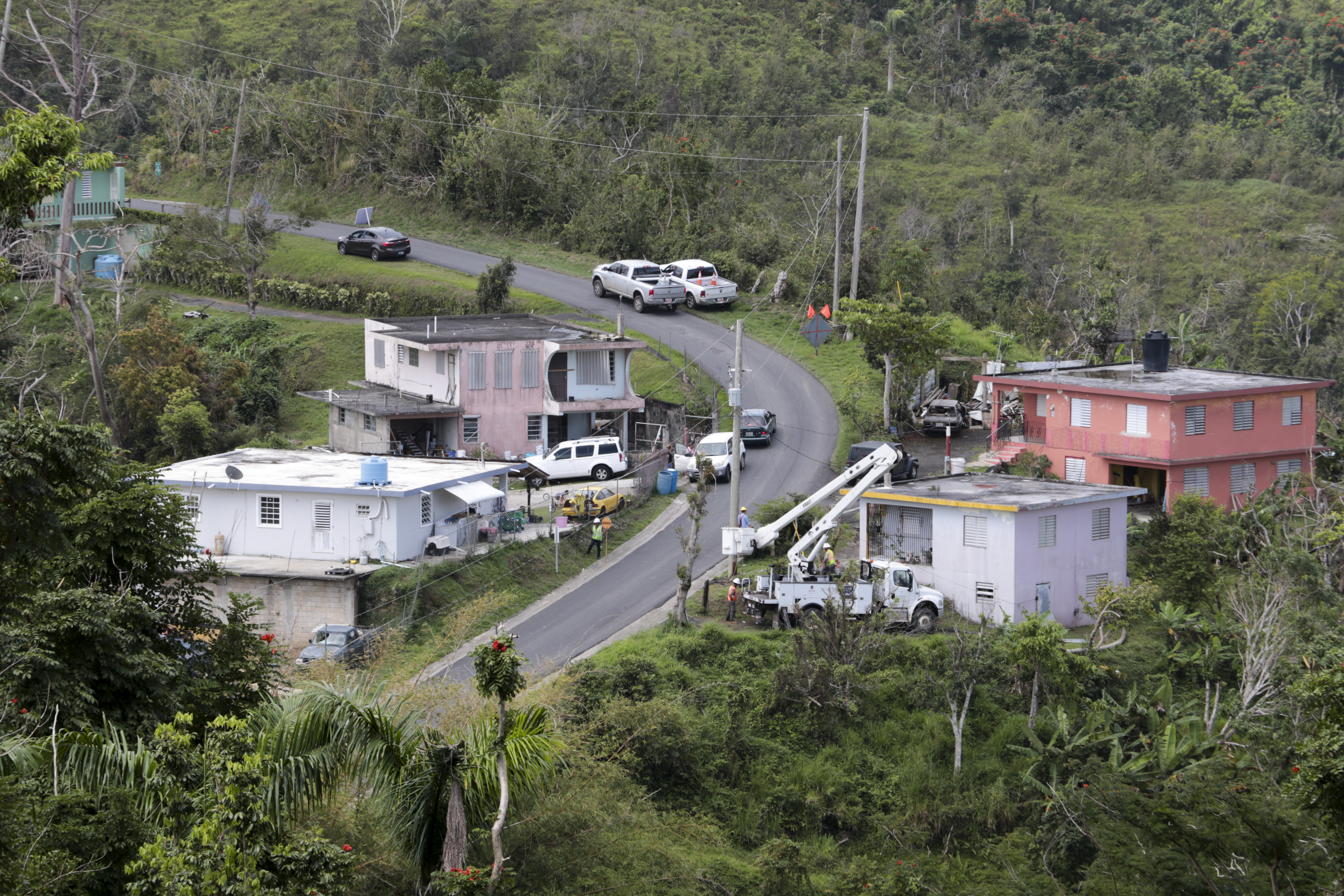
USACE restoring power to San Lorenzo in April 2018

== Geography ==
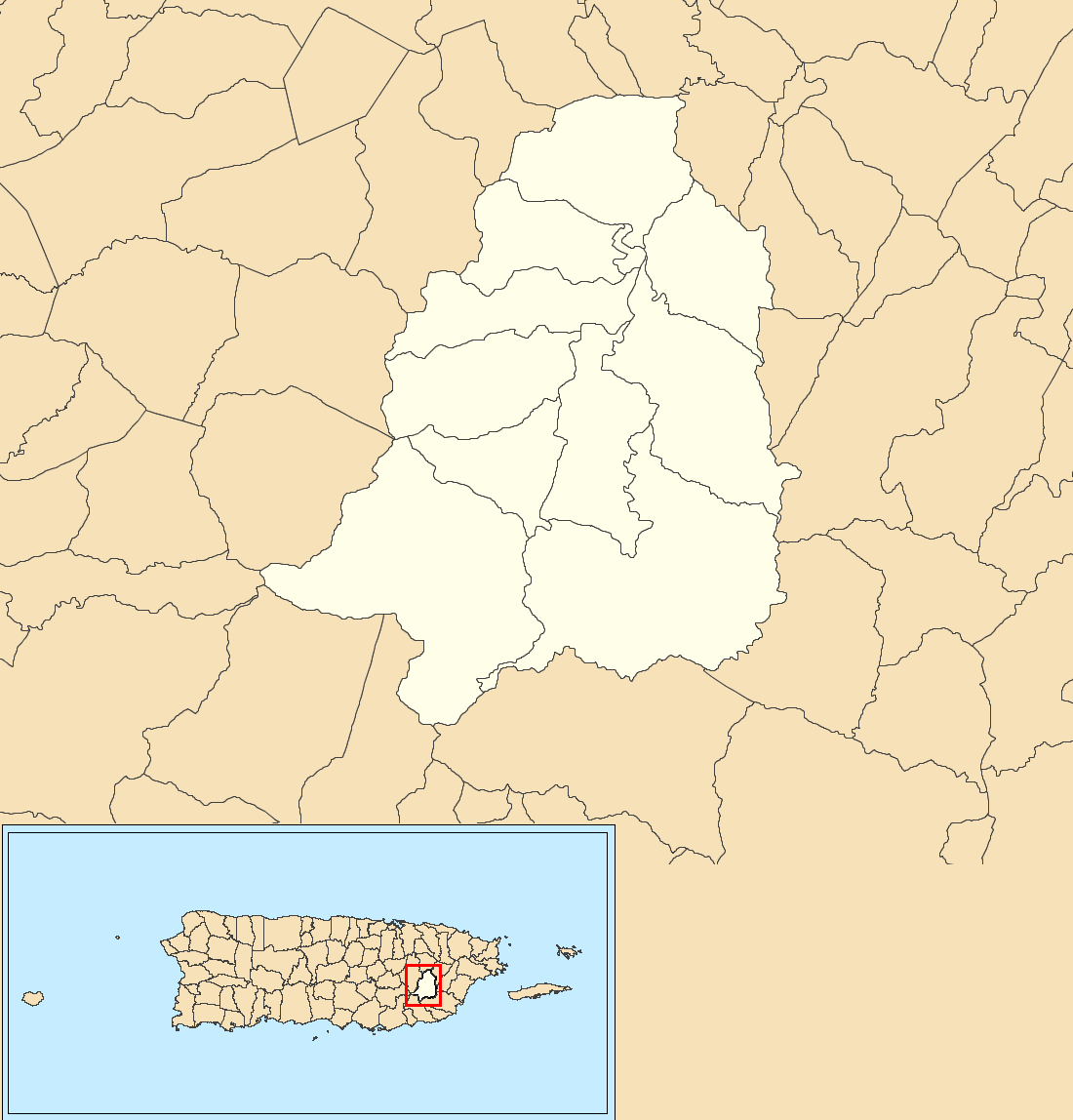
Subdivisions of San Lorenzo.

San Lorenzo is located in the eastern central region, north of Patillas and Yabucoa; south of Gurabo; east of Caguas and Cayey; and west of Juncos and Las Piedras. The highest point in the municipality is Cerro La Santa, itself also the highest point in the Sierra de Cayey.

San Lorenzo Pueblo is located on a high valley that is formed by the Río Grande de Loíza which flows northwestwards towards the Caguas Valley. The town is located on the San Lorenzo Batholith, which is a mountainous region composed of intrusive igneous rock. It is bordered by the Sierra de Luquillo to the north and by the Sierra de Cayey to the south.

=== Rivers ===
- Río Cayaguás
- Río Emajagua
- Río Grande de Loíza
- Río de las Vegas

=== Barrios ===
Like all municipalities of Puerto Rico, San Lorenzo is subdivided into barrios and barrios are further divided into sectors. The municipal buildings, central square and large Catholic church are located in a barrio referred to as "el pueblo".

1. Cayaguas
2. Cerro Gordo
3. Espino
4. Florida
5. Hato
6. Jagual
7. Quebrada
8. Quebrada Arenas
9. Quebrada Honda
10. Quemados
11. San Lorenzo barrio-pueblo

=== Sectors ===
Barrios (which are like minor civil divisions) are further subdivided into smaller areas called sectores (sectors in English). The types of sectores may vary, from normally sector to urbanización to reparto to barriada to residencial, among others.

=== Special Communities ===
Comunidades Especiales de Puerto Rico (Special Communities of Puerto Rico) are marginalized communities whose citizens are experiencing a certain amount of social exclusion. A map shows these communities occur in nearly every municipality of the commonwealth. Of the 742 places that were on the list in 2014, the following barrios, communities, sectors, or neighborhoods were in San Lorenzo: Roosevelt neighborhood, El Bosque, La Marina, Parcelas Jagual (Nuevas y Viejas), Parcelas Quemados and Sector Los Oquendo. Between 2013 and until their arrest by the FBI in 2019, dozens of drug traffickers were operating in the Roosevelt neighborhood and near the Lorenzana public housing residential units in San Lorenzo.

== Demographics ==
Historical population
Census	Pop.	Note	%±
1900	13,433		—
1910	14,278		6.3%
1920	18,136		27.0%
1930	23,479		29.5%
1940	26,627		13.4%
1950	29,248		9.8%
1960	27,950		−4.4%
1970	27,755		−0.7%
1980	32,428		16.8%
1990	35,163		8.4%
2000	40,997		16.6%
2010	41,058		0.1%
2020	37,693		−8.2%
2025 (est.)	37,275	▼	−1.1%
U.S. Decennial Census; 1899 (shown as 1900) 1910-1930; 1930-1950 1960-2000 2010 2020

== Tourism ==
=== Landmarks and places of interest ===
- Priscilla Flores Theater
- Santuario de la Virgen del Carmen in Montaña Santa
- Gallera San Carlos
- Residencia Machín–Ramos
- Río Grande de Loíza (its main source is located within municipal boundaries)
- Iglesia Nuestra Señora de las Mercedes (the church located on the main town square); a historic church built in 1737 and renovated in 1993.
- Hacienda Muñoz

== Economy ==
Agriculture

The economy of San Lorenzo was founded on livestock farming and later included the cultivation of sugar cane, which had been processed on steam-driven farms with oxen. Coffee and fruits are also now cultivated in the municipality. Timber production, which was once very prolific, has declined due to the uncontrolled exploitation of forests.

Industry

Clothing, pharmaceuticals, footwear, electromechanical equipment, industrial and household paints.

== Culture ==
=== Festivals and events ===
San Lorenzo celebrates its patron saint festival in September. The Fiestas Patronales Nuestra Senora de las Mercedes is a religious and cultural celebration that generally features parades, games, artisans, amusement rides, regional food, and live entertainment.

Other festivals and events celebrated in San Lorenzo include:

- Three Kings Caroling-January
- Cavalcade Moncho Roldán-January
- Candelaria Celebrations-February
- Kite Festival-March
- Cross Celebrations-May
- Embroidering and Weave Festival-September
- Passion Fruit Festival-November

=== Sports ===
- Double-A (baseball) team Los Samaritanos - National Champions in 1975, 1997, 1999, 2000, 2001, and 2002
- Agustin Reyes Half Marathon

== Government ==
Like all municipalities in Puerto Rico, San Lorenzo is administered by a mayor. The current mayor is Jaime Alverio Ramos, from the New Progressive Party (PNP). Alverio was first elected at the 2020 general election.

The city belongs to the Puerto Rico Senatorial district VII, which is represented by two Senators. In 2024, Wanda Soto Tolentino and Luis Daniel Colón La Santa were elected as District Senators.

== Transportation ==
There are 49 bridges in San Lorenzo.

== Symbols ==
The municipio has an official flag and coat of arms.

=== Flag ===
The flag of San Lorenzo is divided in four rectangles of equal size, two rectangles are yellow and the other two are striped with red and yellow stripes.

=== Coat of arms ===
The grill is the traditional symbol of San Lorenzo, deacon and martyr, patron of the town, because in a grill he underwent the martyrdom, slowly burned to death. The hill or mountain represent the Gregorio Hill, which dominates the San Lorenzo panorama. The cross is one of the heraldic attributes of San Miguel Arcángel.

== Notable people ==
- Chayanne - Singer and actor
- Edwin Cruz - Lead Singer - “Mechi”
- Antonio Fernós-Isern - Former Resident Commissioner
- Priscila Flores - Singer
- Josúe "Jay" Fonseca - Political Commentator
- El Invader #1- Puerto Rican wrestler
- José Aponte Hernandéz - Former Speaker House Of Representatives
- Carmita Jiménez - Singer
- Antulio Parrilla Bonilla - Father of Puerto Rican Cooperative Movement, Jesuit priest.
- Ernestina Reyes “La Calandria” - Singer
- Victor Rivera - Wrestler
- Dr. Marc H. Rosa, - Former Teacher, School Administrator And University Professor
- José Tous Soto - Former Speaker House Of Representatives
- Carlos Vázquez Cruz - Writer

== See also ==
- List of Puerto Ricans
- History of Puerto Rico
