= Quebrada, San Lorenzo, Puerto Rico =

Barrio of Puerto Rico

Quebrada
- Barrio
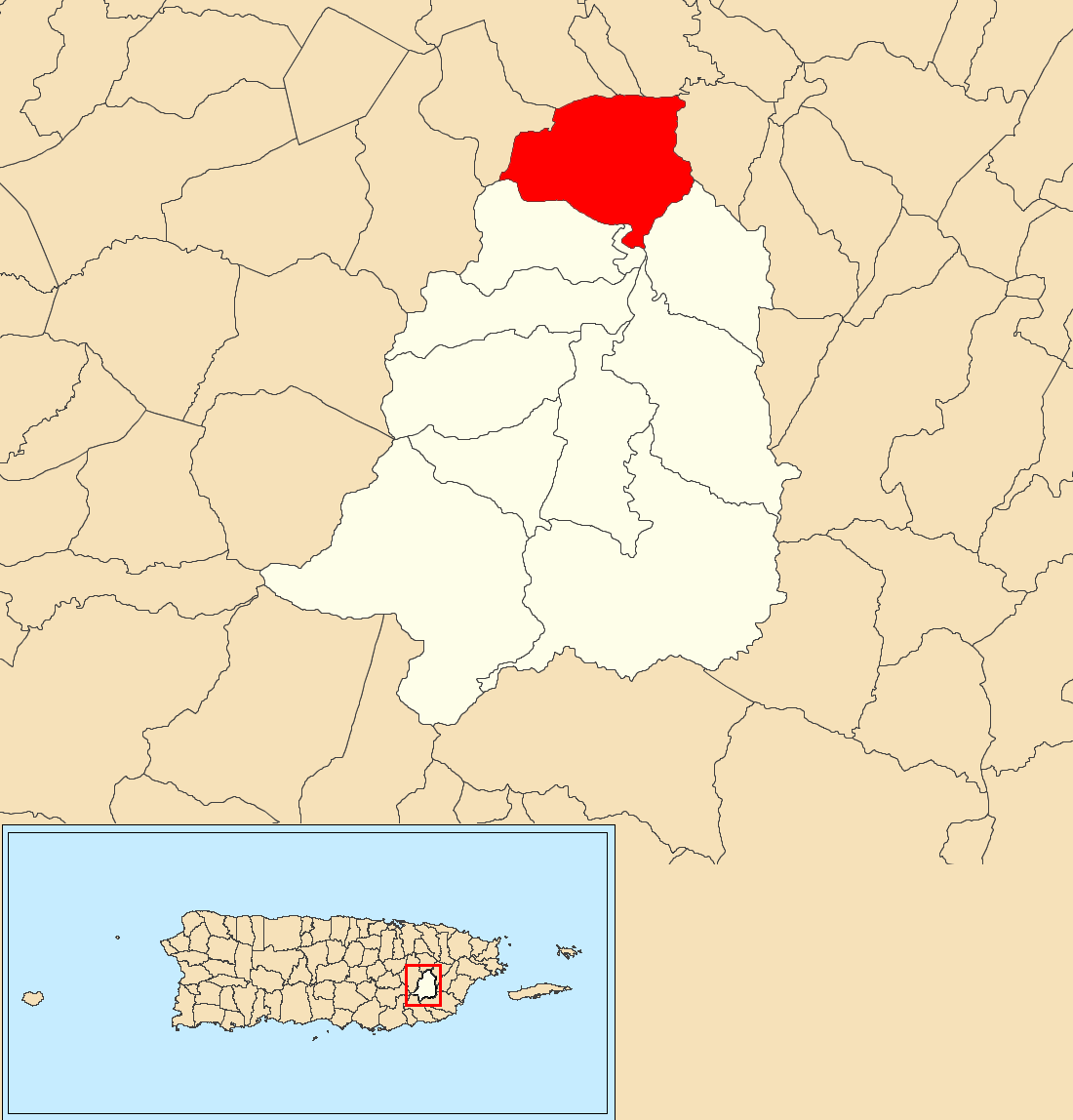
- Location of Quebrada within the municipality of San Lorenzo shown in red

- Location of Puerto Rico
- Coordinates: 18°12′58″N 65°57′52″W
- Commonwealth: Puerto Rico
- Municipality: San Lorenzo

Area
  - Total: 4.92 sq mi (12.7 km^{2})
  - Land: 4.90 sq mi (12.7 km^{2})
  - Water: 0.02 sq mi (0.052 km^{2})
- Elevation: 548 ft (167 m)

Population (2010)
  - Total: 3,354
  - Density: 684.5/sq mi (264.3/km^{2})
- Source: 2010 Census
- Time zone: UTC−4 (AST)
- ZIP Code: 00754
- Area code: 787/939

Quebrada is a barrio in the municipality of San Lorenzo, Puerto Rico. Its population in 2010 was 3,354.

== History ==
Quebrada was in Spain's gazetteers until Puerto Rico was ceded by Spain in the aftermath of the Spanish–American War under the terms of the Treaty of Paris of 1898 and became an unincorporated territory of the United States. In 1899, the United States Department of War conducted a census of Puerto Rico finding that the population of Quebrada barrio was 1,198.

Historical population
Census	Pop.	Note	%±
1900	1,198		—
1910	919		−23.3%
1920	1,011		10.0%
1930	1,508		49.2%
1940	1,697		12.5%
1950	1,270		−25.2%
1960	1,012		−20.3%
1970	0		−100.0%
1980	1,296		—
1990	1,838		41.8%
2000	2,231		21.4%
2010	3,354		50.3%
U.S. Decennial Census; 1899 (shown as 1900) 1910-1930; 1930-1950 1980-2000 2010

== Sectors ==
Barrios (which are, in contemporary times, roughly comparable to minor civil divisions) in turn are further subdivided into smaller local populated place areas/units called sectores (sectors in English). The types of sectores may vary, from normally sector to urbanización to reparto to barriada to residencial, among others.

The following sectors are in Quebrada barrio:

Colonia Vapor, Entrada Crematorio, Sector Alamo, Sector Arzuaga, Sector Bruseles, Sector Cachete, Sector Capilla, Sector Carmelo Dávila, Sector Cuatro Calles, Sector Gómez, Sector Jardines de San Joaquín, Sector Los Agosto, Sector Los Dávila, Sector Méndez Sector Bezares, Sector Rojas, Sector Santa, Sector Serrano, Sector Valles de San Joaquín, Sector Valles de San Lorenzo, Sector Vázquez, Sector Vistas de Quebrada, Urbanización Haciendas Parque de San Lorenzo, Urbanización Sabanera del Río, Urbanización Savannah Real, Urbanización Valles de Quebrada, and Urbanización Villas de Quebrada.

== See also ==
- List of communities in Puerto Rico
- List of barrios and sectors of San Lorenzo, Puerto Rico
