= Canóvanas (disambiguation) =

Canóvanas may refer to:

- Canóvanas, Puerto Rico, a municipality
- Canóvanas, Canóvanas, Puerto Rico, a barrio
- Canóvanas, Loíza, Puerto Rico, a barrio
- Canóvanas barrio-pueblo, a barrio
