= List of barrios and sectors of Canóvanas, Puerto Rico =

Like all municipalities of Puerto Rico, Canóvanas is subdivided into administrative units called barrios, which are, in contemporary times, roughly comparable to minor civil divisions. The barrios and subbarrios, in turn, are further subdivided into smaller local populated place areas/units called sectores (sectors in English). The types of sectores may vary, from normally sector to urbanización to reparto to barriada to residencial, among others. Some sectors appear in two barrios.

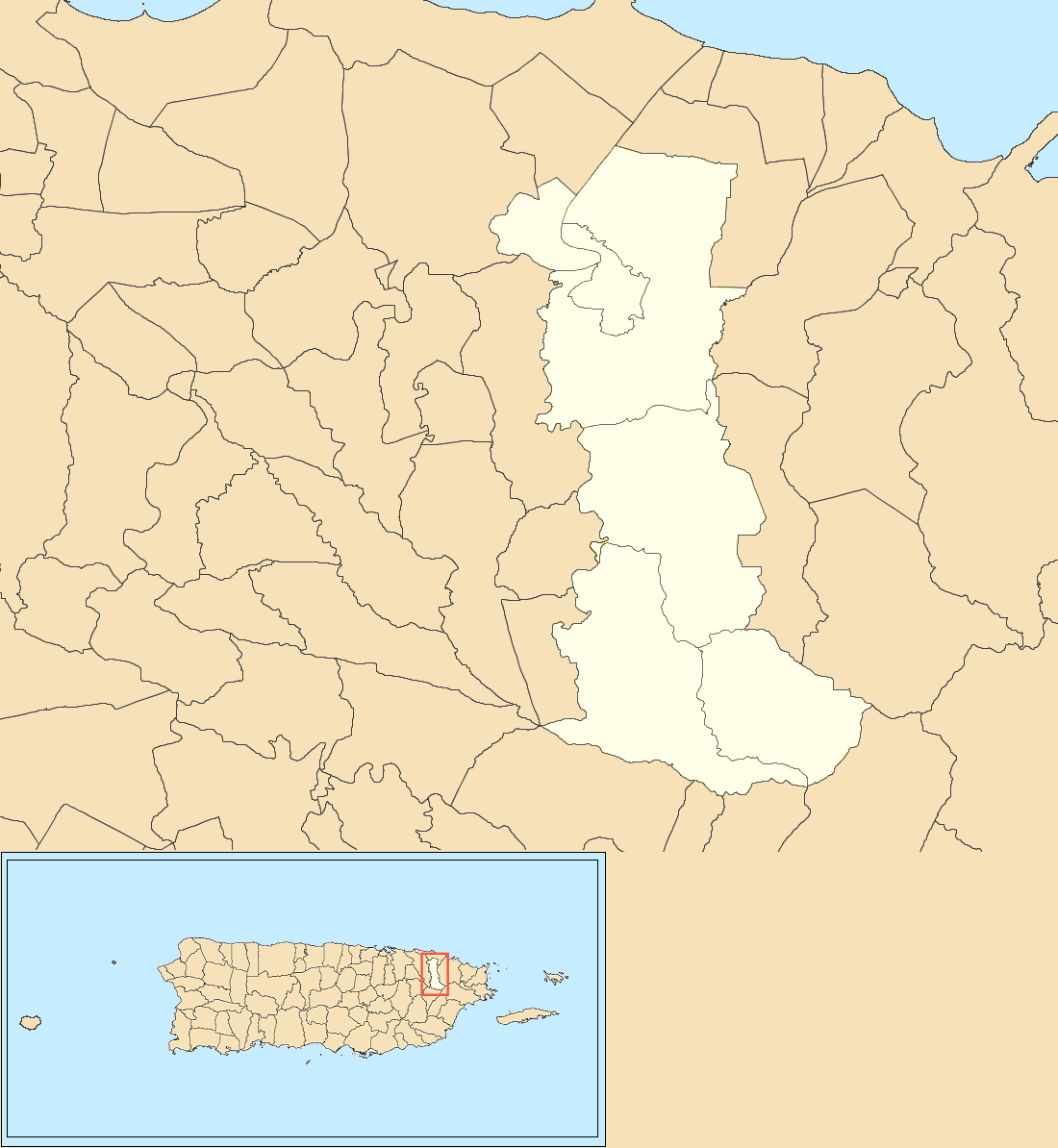
Canóvanas map with barrio subdivisions

== List of sectors by barrio ==
=== Canóvanas ===
- Apartamentos Alborada
- Apartamentos Ciudad Jardín
- Barrio Cambalache
- Barrio San Isidro
- Condominios Park View Terrace
- Estancias del Río
- Hacienda de Canóvanas
- Parcelas Viejas
- Río Plantation
- River Gardens
- River Plantation
- River Valley Park
- River Valley Town Park
- River Villas
- Sector Dos Cuerdas
- Sector Haciendas Cambalache
- Sector Hipódromo El Comandante
- Sector Los Bobos
- Sector Los Pérez
- Sector Los Sotos
- Sector Valle Hills
- Sector Villa Hugo I y II
- Señorío de Gonzaga
- Urbanización Ciudad Jardín (Walk Up)
- Urbanización Estancias de Campo Rico
- Urbanización Forest Plantation
- Urbanización Loíza Valley
- Urbanización Mansiones del Tesoro
- Urbanización River Valley
- Urbanización Villas de Cambalache
- Urbanización Vistas de Río Grande

==== San Isidro comunidad ====
- Comunidad
- Estancias Tierra Alta
- Extensión Quintas y Estancias de Jardines de Palmarejo
- Parcelas Nuevas
- Sector Las Delicias
- Sector Monte Verde
- Sector Sucusucu
- Sector Villa Conquistador I y II
- Sector Villa Tiro

=== Canóvanas barrio-pueblo ===
- Apartamentos del Valle
- Apartamentos Portal Campestre
- Condominios Plaza del Este
- Residencial Jesús T. Piñero
- Sector Hipódromo el Comandante
- Urbanización Ciudad Jardín
- Urbanización Country View
- Urbanización del Pilar
- Urbanización Jardines de Canóvanas
- Urbanización Las Vegas
- Urbanización Quintas de Canóvanas
- Urbanización Villa Dorada

=== Cubuy ===
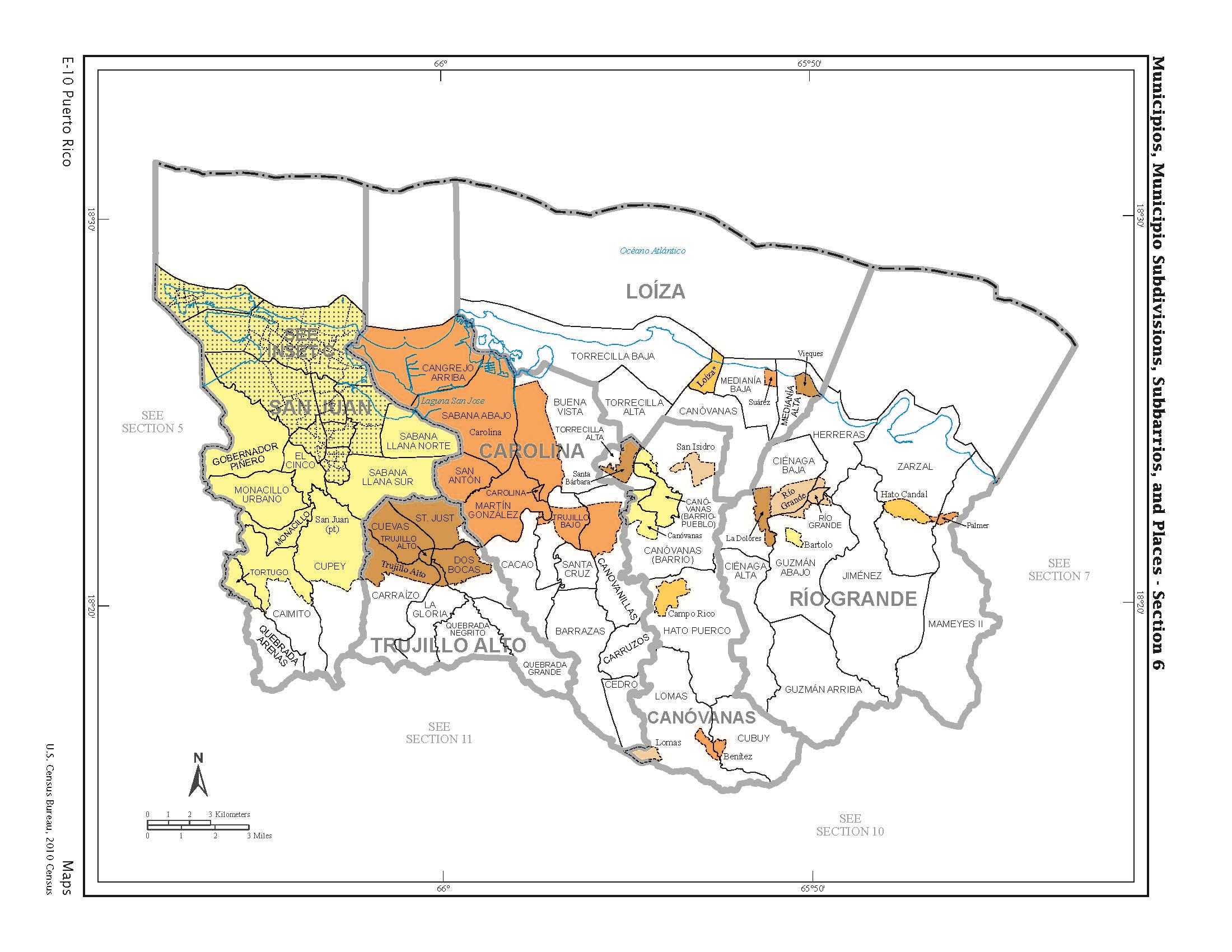
US 2010 Census map of Subdivisions, and Places of Canóvanas, and neighboring municipalities

- Comunidad Villa Sin Miedo
- Parcelas Benítez
- Sector Añoranza (de Cubuy)
- Sector Condesa
- Sector Cubuy Marines
- Sector La Gallera
- Sector Los Cafés
- Sector Los Pereira

=== Hato Puerco ===
==== Campo Rico ====
- Camino Los Matos
- Camino Los Navarro
- Carretera 185
- Finca Pozos
- Parcelas Alturas de Campo Rico
- Parcelas Campo Rico
- Sector Belia
- Sector Canovanillas
- Sector Chorrito
- Sector El Purgatorio
- Sector Febo
- Sector La Marina
- Sector La Vega
- Sector Loma del Viento
- Sector Los Castillos
- Sector Los González
- Sector Maga
- Sector Puente Moreno
- Sector Toma de Agua
- Urbanización Las Haciendas

==== Palma Sola ====
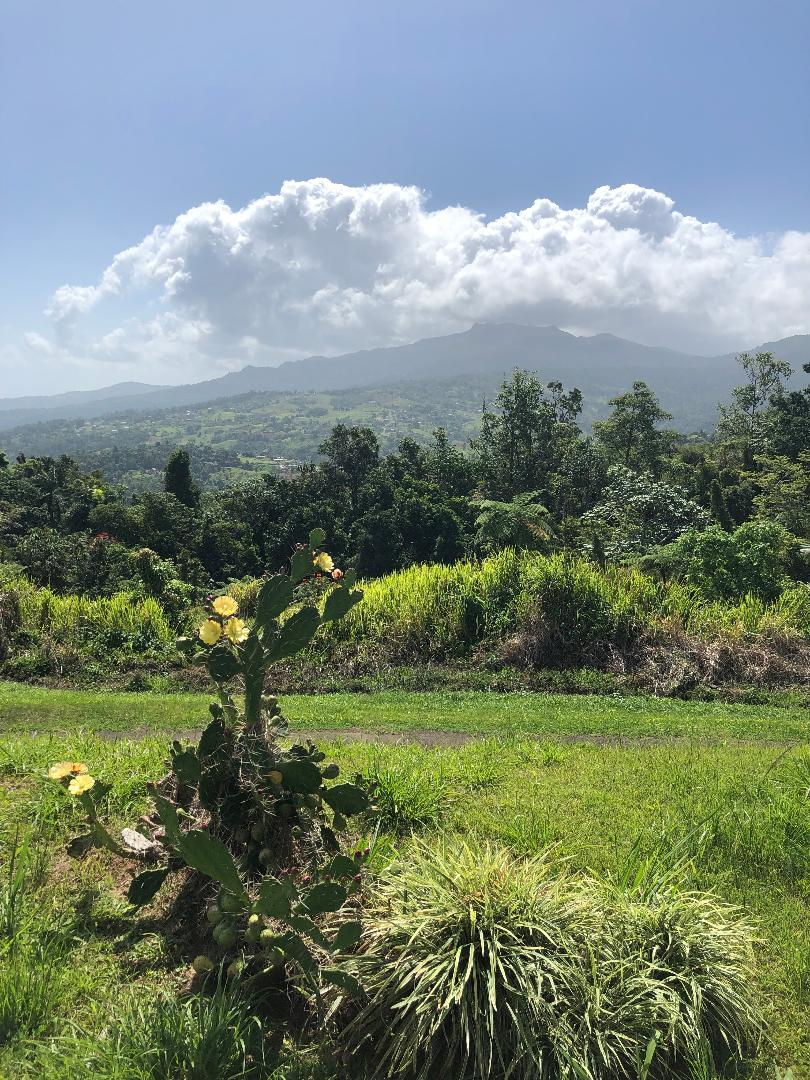
Palma Sola, sometimes called "Barrio Palma Sola"

- Carretera 957
- Sector El Hoyo
- Sector Los Castros
- Sector Maga
- Sector Peniel

=== Lomas ===
- Parcelas Las Cuatrocientas
- Sector Las Yayas
- Sector Lomas Cole
- Sector Los Casillas
- Sector Los Fortis
- Sector Los González
- Sector Martín Rodríguez
- Sector Quebrada Prieta

=== Torrecilla Alta ===
- Parcelas Torrecilla Alta
- Sector Finca Virginia
- Sector La Central
- Sector Parachofer
- Sector Pueblo Indio
- Sector Pueblo Seco
- Sector Santa Catalina
- Sector Sierra Maestra
- Sector Villa Borinquen
- Sector Villa Inglés
- Sector Villa Santa
- Urbanización Brisas de Canóvanas
- Urbanización Brisas de Loíza
- Urbanización Eucalipto
- Urbanización Usubal

== See also ==
- List of communities in Puerto Rico
