= Puerto Rico Highway 185 =

Highway in Puerto Rico

Highway 185
- Ruta 185

Route information
- Maintained by Puerto Rico DTPW
- Length: 21.1 km (13.1 mi)
- Existed: 1953–present

Major junctions
- South end: PR-30 in Mamey
- PR-189 in Mamey; PR-9185 in Gurabo Abajo; PR-953 in Cedro; PR-853 in Cedro; PR-857 in Lomas; PR-186 in Hato Puerco; PR-957 in Hato Puerco; PR-66 in Canóvanas; PR-962 in Canóvanas; PR-3 in Canóvanas barrio-pueblo
- North end: PR-9959 in Canóvanas barrio-pueblo

Location
- Country: United States
- Territory: Puerto Rico
- Municipalities: Juncos, Carolina, Canóvanas

Highway system
- Roads in Puerto Rico; List
| ← PR-184 | → PR-186 |
| ← PR-8869 | PR-9185 | → PR-9188 |

Puerto Rico Highway 185 (PR-185) is a main highway that connects Canóvanas, Puerto Rico to Juncos, Puerto Rico and is about 25 kilometers long. It begins in downtown of Canóvanas, very close to Puerto Rico Highway 3 and ends in Puerto Rico Highway 952 and Puerto Rico Highway 30 in Juncos.

== Route description ==
For people coming from/going to Caguas, the highway has a direct intersection with PR-30; for those coming from/going to Humacao, drivers have to take short highway PR-952 and then take PR-189 just before its intersection with PR-30, hence this exit being one of the most disorganized junctions in the island between a main highway and a main freeway or tollway in the island. New Puerto Rico Highway 66 also has a poor-designed intersection with the highway, since it only allow people going to/coming from Carolina (west) and not the east. This is probably because the short segment open from the new tollway immediately ends at PR-3 only 2 kilometers from the exit to PR-185 and thus expected to be fixed when the segment to Río Grande opens to the public.

The highway enters a small portion of Carolina, before it enters Canóvanas. PR-185 serves as an alternate route for people who drive the way between the metro area and the southeast, and it does not climb many hills and is generally wide. It is a much better option than taking Puerto Rico Highway 181 or going to Fajardo and then go south via PR-53, since the island is wider in the north than in the south segment.

== Major intersections ==
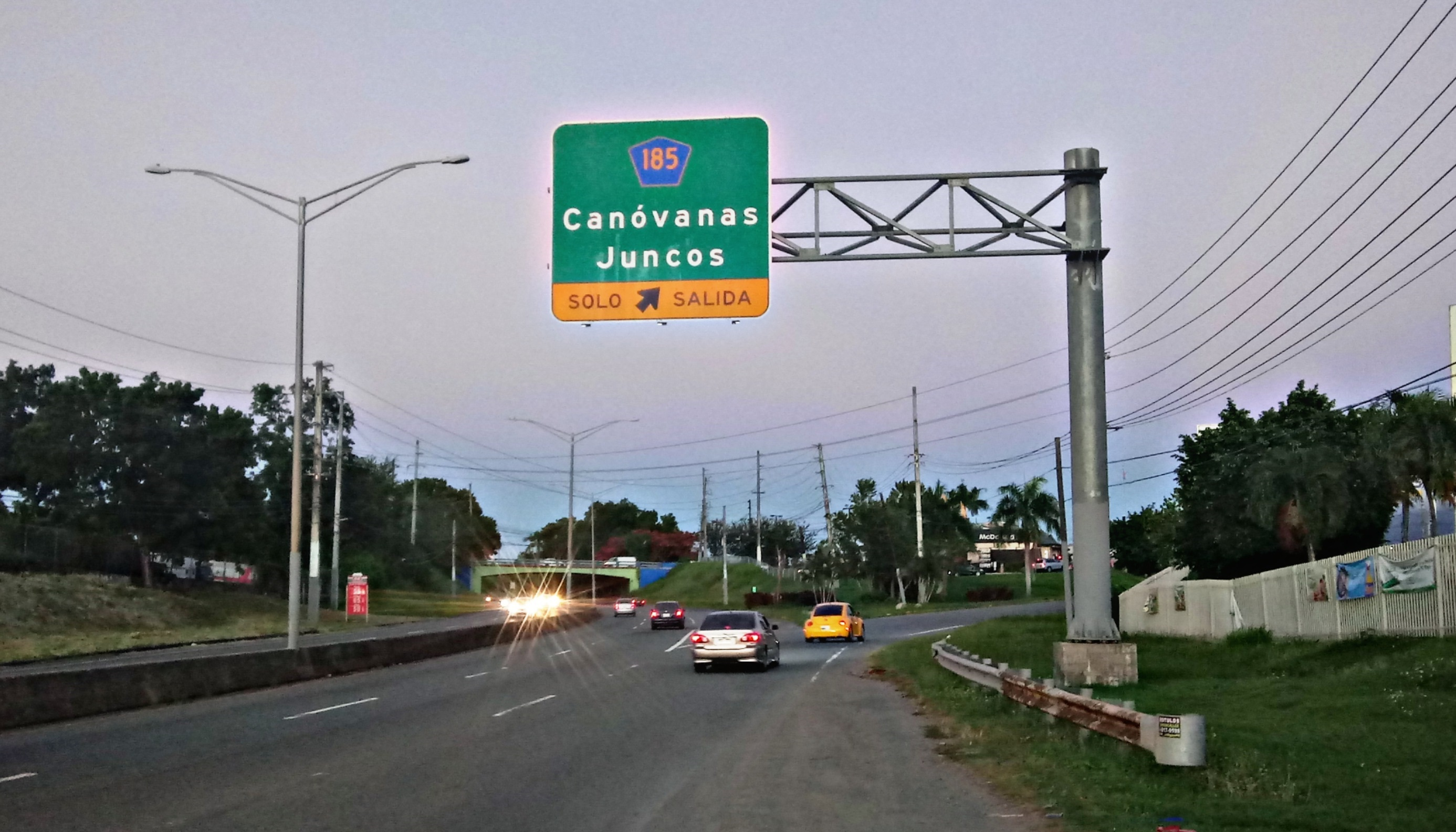
PR-3 east at the exit to PR-185 in downtown Canóvanas

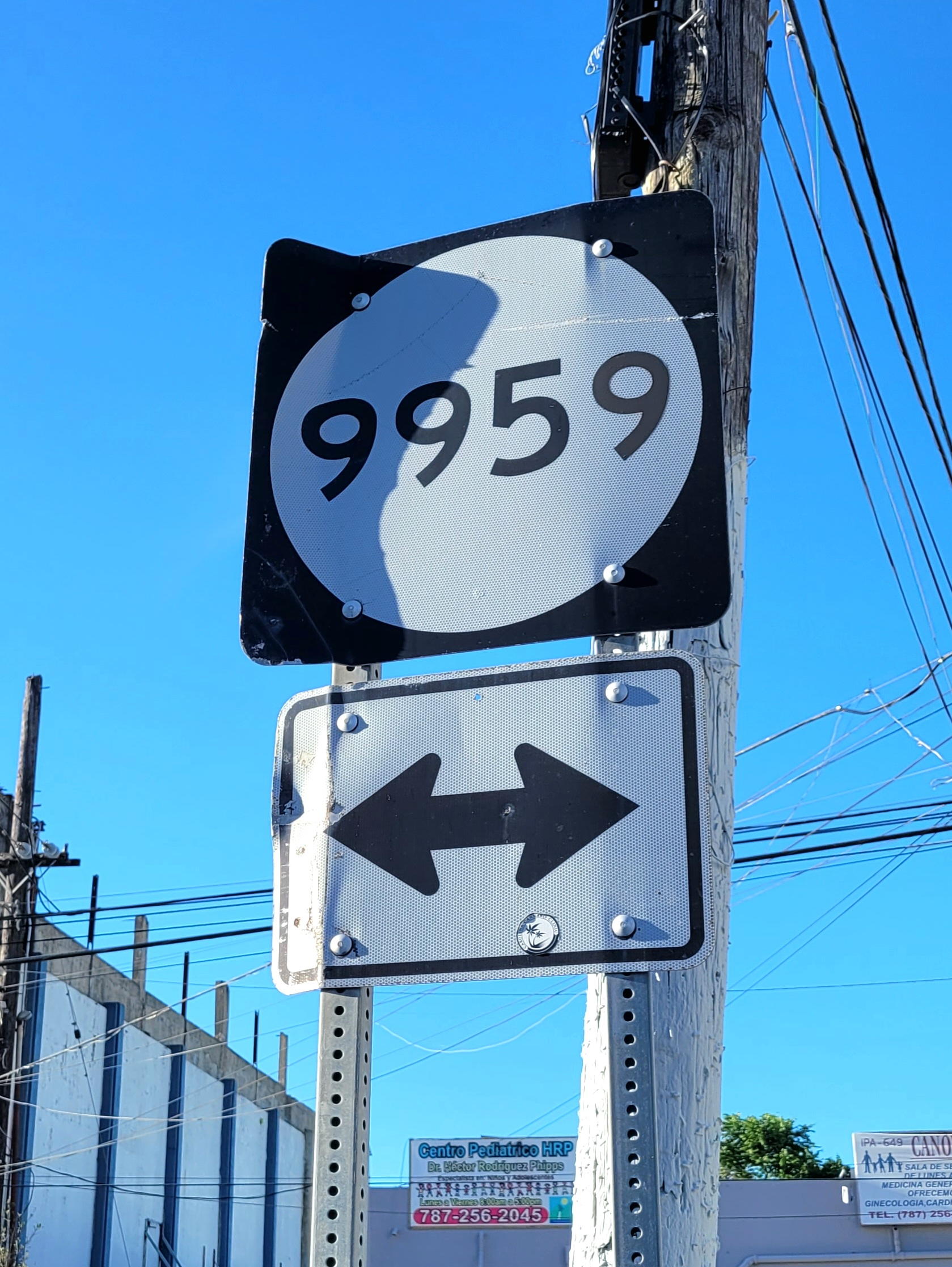
PR-185 north at PR-9959 intersection in downtown Canóvanas

| Municipality | Location | km | mi | Destinations | Notes |
|---|---|---|---|---|---|
| Juncos | Mamey | 21.1 | 13.1 | PR-30 west (Expreso Cruz Ortiz Stella) – Caguas | Southern terminus of PR-185; PR-30 exit 12; eastbound exit and westbound entrance |
| Juncos | Mamey | 21.0 | 13.0 | PR-189 – Humacao, Caguas | |
| Juncos | Mamey | 20.7 | 12.9 | PR-952 – Juncos | |
| Juncos | Gurabo Abajo | 20.4– 20.3 | 12.7– 12.6 | PR-9185 east – Juncos | |
| Canóvanas | No major junctions | | | | |
| Carolina | Cedro | 15.9 | 9.9 | PR-9045 – Gurabo | Former PR-945 |
| Carolina | Cedro | 15.8 | 9.8 | PR-953 – Lomas | |
| Carolina | Cedro | 12.7 | 7.9 | PR-853 (Carretera Felipe Birriel Fernández, "El Gigante de Carolina") – Carolina | |
| Carolina | Cedro | 12.2 | 7.6 | PR-8856 – Barrazas | |
| Canóvanas | Lomas | 10.5 | 6.5 | PR-857 – Carolina | |
| Canóvanas | Hato Puerco | 8.4 | 5.2 | PR-186 – Lomas | |
| Canóvanas | Hato Puerco | 5.4 | 3.4 | PR-957 – Palma Sola | |
| Canóvanas | Hato Puerco | 4.6 | 2.9 | PR-954 – Carruzos | |
| Canóvanas | Canóvanas | 2.4 | 1.5 | PR-66 west (Autopista Roberto Sánchez Vilella) – San Juan | PR-66 exit 10; incomplete diamond interchange; eastbound exit and westbound entrance |
| Canóvanas | Canóvanas | 2.2 | 1.4 | PR-962 – Cambalache | |
| Canóvanas | Canóvanas barrio-pueblo | 0.5 | 0.31 | PR-3 – Carolina, Río Grande | Partial cloverleaf interchange |
| Canóvanas | Canóvanas barrio-pueblo | 0.0 | 0.0 | PR-9959 (Calle Santiago R. Palmer) – Canóvanas | Northern terminus of PR-185 |
1.000 mi = 1.609 km; 1.000 km = 0.621 mi: Incomplete access

== Related route ==
Highway 9185
- Location: Juncos
- Length: 2.6 km (1.6 mi)

Puerto Rico Highway 9185 (PR-9185) is a bypass road that branches off from PR-185 in Gurabo Abajo and ends at PR-31 in Ceiba Norte. The entire route is located in Juncos.

| Location | km | mi | Destinations | Notes |
|---|---|---|---|---|
| Gurabo Abajo | 0.0 | 0.0 | PR-185 – Juncos Centro, Caguas, Canóvanas | Western terminus of PR-9185 |
| Ceiba Norte | 2.6 | 1.6 | PR-31 | Eastern terminus of PR-9185; access to Naguabo |
1.000 mi = 1.609 km; 1.000 km = 0.621 mi

== See also ==
- 1953 Puerto Rico highway renumbering
