= Canóvanas River =

River of Puerto Rico

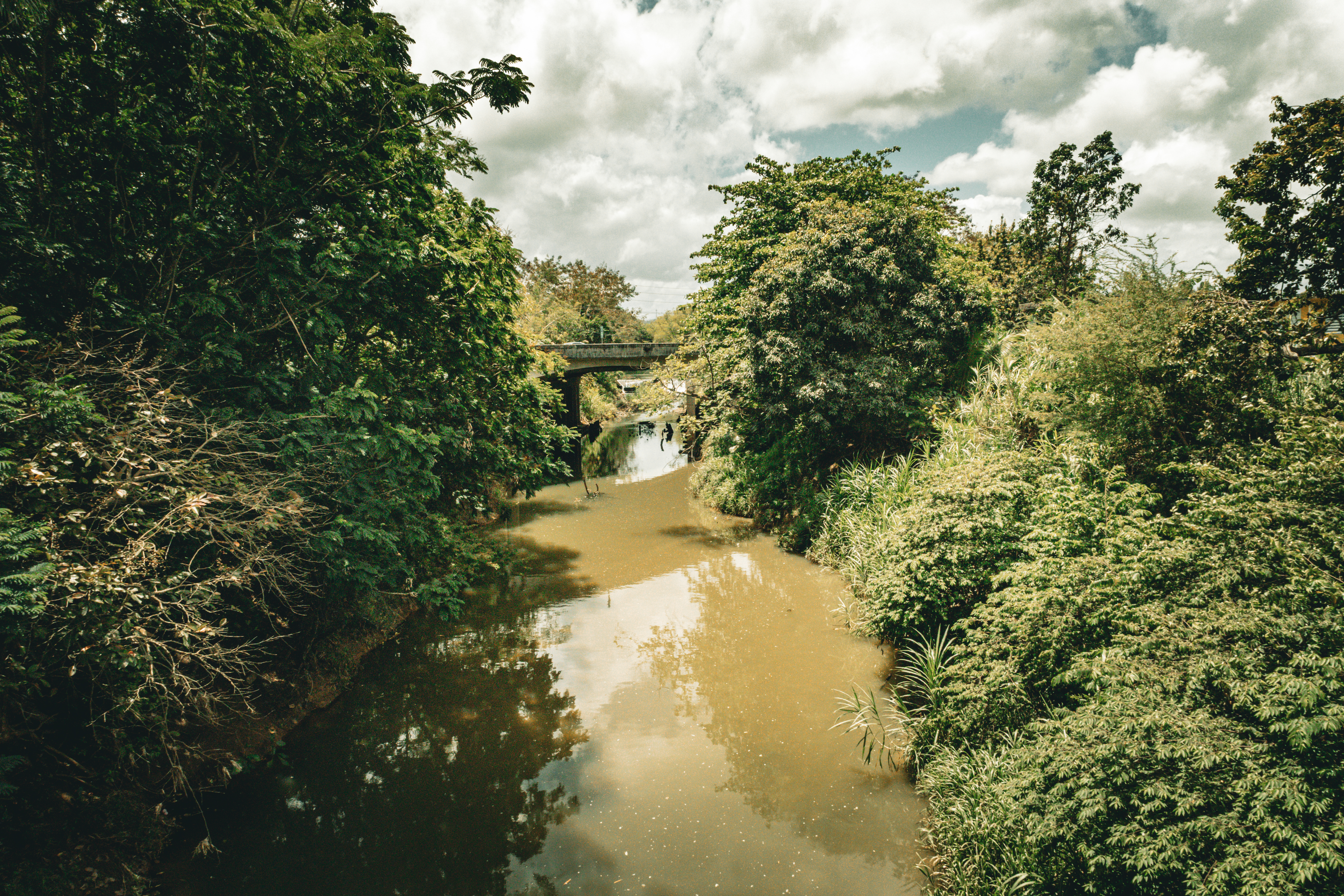
- Canóvanas River from the Villarán Bridge
- Native name: Río Canóvanas (Spanish)

Location
- Commonwealth: Puerto Rico
- Municipality: Canóvanas, Loíza, Río Grande

Physical characteristics
- Source
  - location: El Toro in Guzmán Arriba, Río Grande
- Mouth
  - location: Loíza River in Canóvanas Pueblo, Canóvanas
  - coordinates: 18.3918928°N 65.9129424°W
  - elevation: 10 ft.

Basin features
- Tributaries
  - left: Cubuy River
- Waterfalls: Los Pilones

The Canóvanas River (Spanish: Río Canóvanas) is a tributary of the Loíza River (Río Grande de Loíza) that flows through the municipalities of Canóvanas and Río Grande, Puerto Rico.

== Geography ==
The Canóvanas River is one of the primary tributaries of the Loíza River within the northern plains geographical region of Puerto Rico. Its headwaters originate on the northern slope of El Toro massif of the Sierra de Luquillo, within the boundaries of barrio Guzmán Arriba of Río Grande. These headwaters are protected as part of El Yunque National Forest, particularly within El Toro Wilderness. The river then flows northward, splitting the municipality of Canóvanas in half as it flows to the lower valley of the Loíza River. Its mouth lies just north of Canóvanas Pueblo, close to the former sugarcane plantation and refinery of Central Canóvanas.

== Recreation ==
There are numerous popular swimming areas along the river, for example, Charco Los Pilones and Charco de los Caballos are located in an area of stream pools (charco) located in the Lomas and Hato Puerco barrios of Canóvanas.

== See also ==
- List of rivers of Puerto Rico
