= Villarán =

Villarán may refer to:

- Susana Villarán (born 1949), Peruvian politician
- Villarán Bridge, bridge in Canóvanas, Puerto Rico
