= Torrecilla Alta, Canóvanas, Puerto Rico =

Barrio of Puerto Rico

Torrecilla Alta
- Barrio
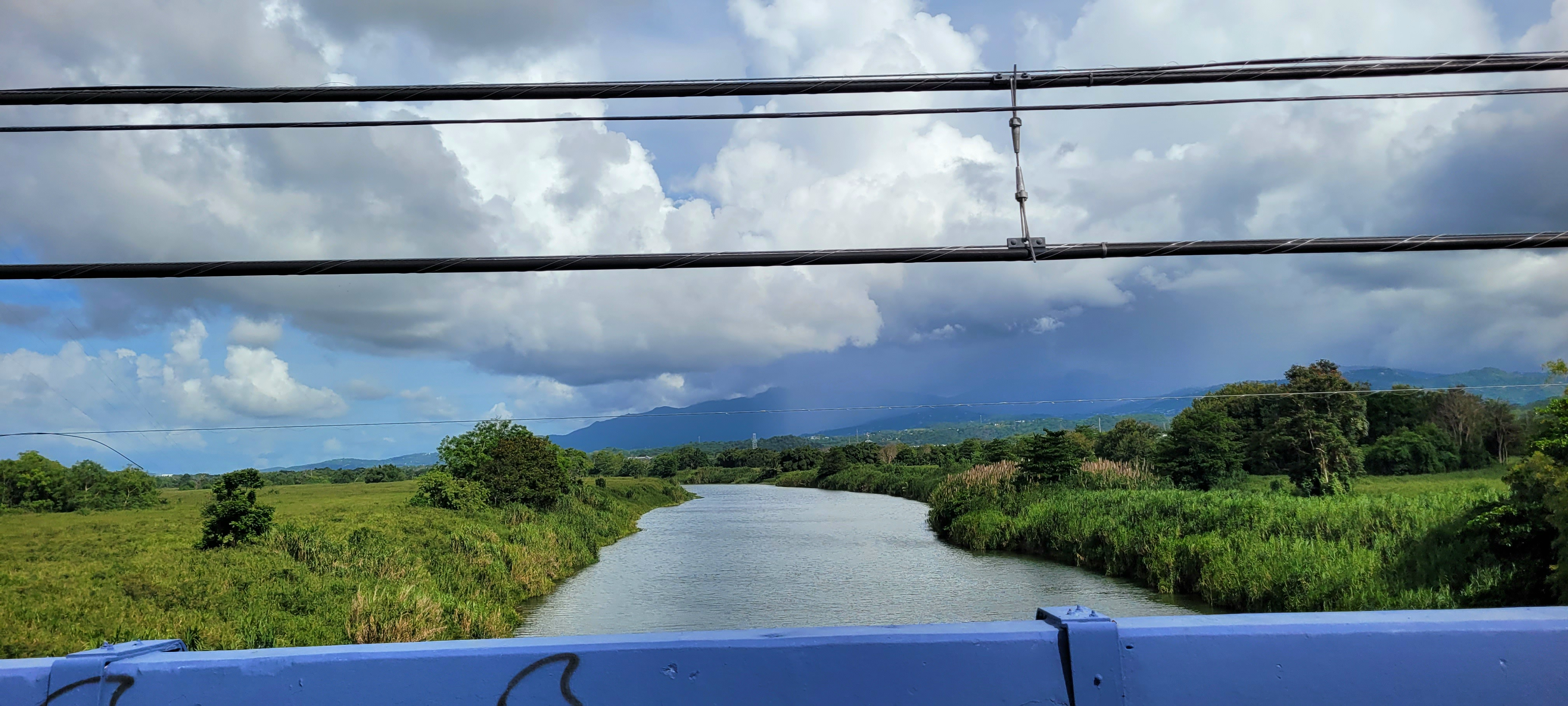
- Río Grande de Loíza between Canóvanas and Carolina

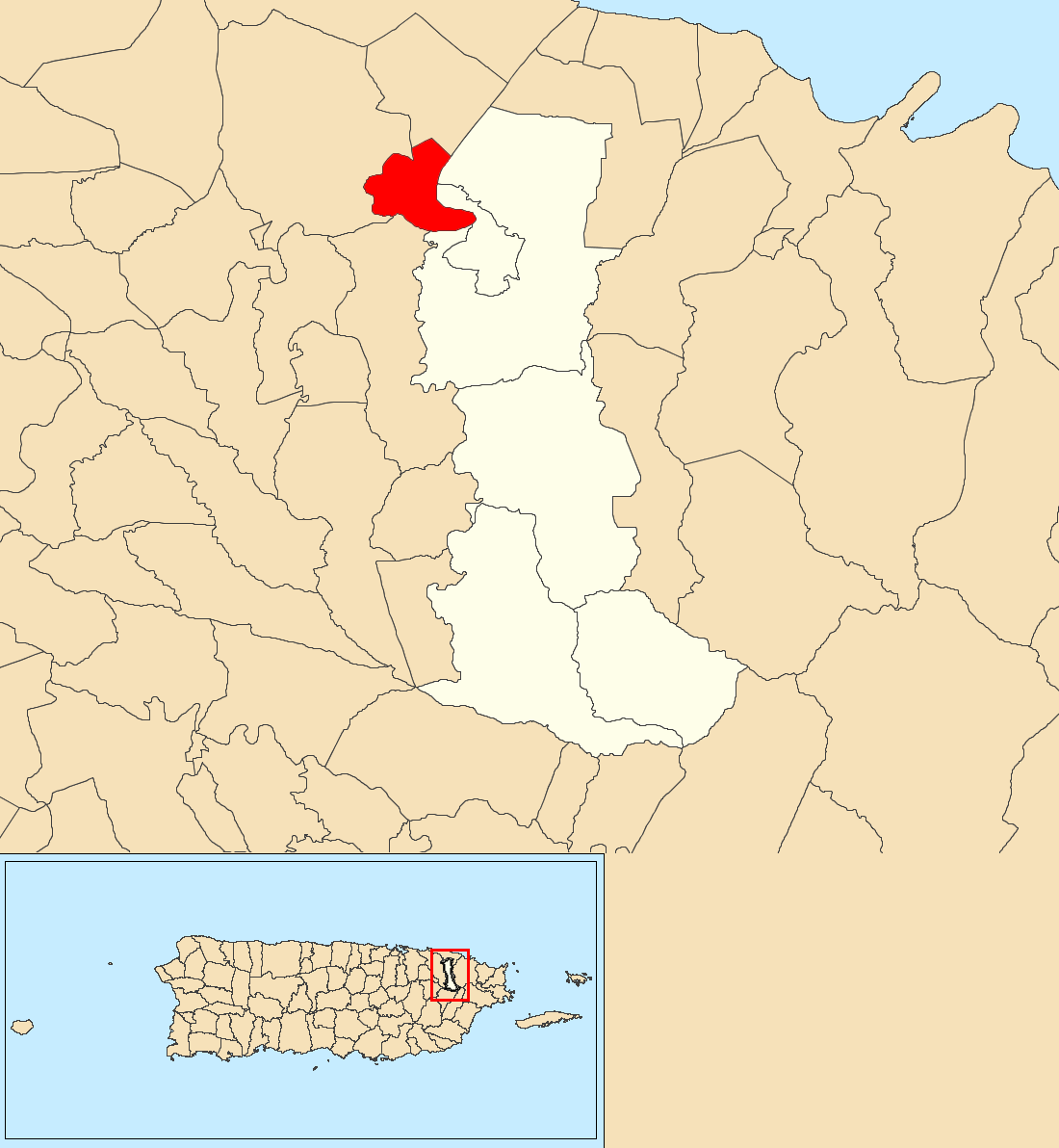
- Location of Torrecilla Alta within the municipality of Canóvanas shown in red

- Location of Puerto Rico
- Coordinates: 18°23′30″N 65°55′07″W
- Commonwealth: Puerto Rico
- Municipality: Canóvanas

Area
  - Total: 1.49 sq mi (3.9 km^{2})
  - Land: 1.45 sq mi (3.8 km^{2})
  - Water: 0.04 sq mi (0.10 km^{2})
- Elevation: 75 ft (23 m)

Population (2010)
  - Total: 6,612
  - Density: 4,560/sq mi (1,760/km^{2})
- Source: 2010 Census
- Time zone: UTC−4 (AST)

Torrecilla Alta is a barrio in the municipality of Canóvanas, Puerto Rico. Its population in 2010 was 6,612.

== Features ==
Torrecilla Alta in Canóvanas shares a border with Torrecillas Alta in Loíza, a neighboring municipality. Both are near mangroves and the Río Grande de Loíza. Alligators are known to roam the areas near the mangroves and when discovered, the creatures are moved to a location managed by the Department of Resources.

Historical population
Census	Pop.	Note	%±
1970	0		—
1980	5,225		—
1990	5,558		6.4%
2000	7,073		27.3%
2010	6,612		−6.5%
U.S. Decennial Census; 1899 (shown as 1900) 1910-1930; 1930-1950 1980-2000 2010

== Sectors ==
Barrios (which are, in contemporary times, roughly comparable to minor civil divisions) in turn are further subdivided into smaller local populated place areas/units called sectores (sectors in English). The types of sectores may vary, from normally sector to urbanización to reparto to barriada to residencial, among others.

The following sectors are in Torrecilla Alta barrio:

Parcelas Torrecilla Alta, Sector Finca Virginia, Sector La Central, Sector Parachofer, Sector Pueblo Indio, Sector Pueblo Seco, Sector Santa Catalina, Sector Sierra Maestra, Sector Villa Borinquen, Sector Villa Inglés, Sector Villa Santa, Urbanización Brisas de Canóvanas, Urbanización Brisas de Loíza, Urbanización Eucalipto, and Urbanización Usubal.

== See also ==
- List of communities in Puerto Rico
- List of barrios and sectors of Canóvanas, Puerto Rico
