= Palma Sola (Puerto Rico) =

Small neighborhood in Canóvanas, Puerto Rico

- Neighborhood
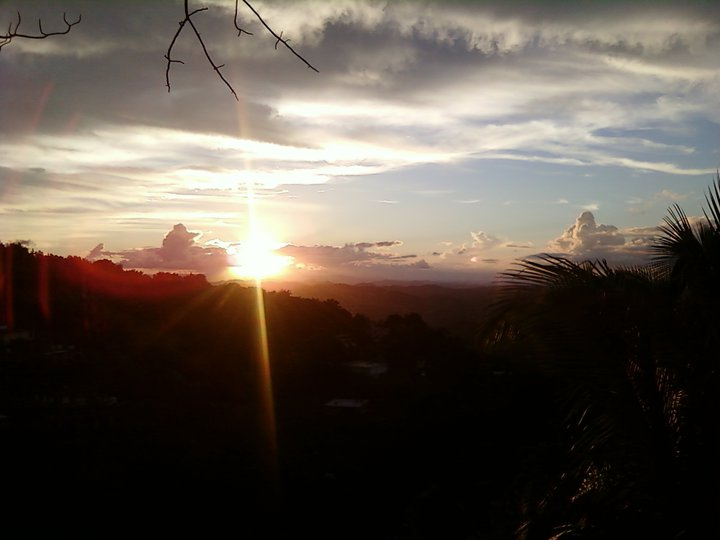
- Sunset from Palma Sola

- Palma Sola in Hato Puerco Palma Sola (the Caribbean)
- Coordinates: 18°19′23″N 65°52′19″W
- Commonwealth: Puerto Rico
- Municipality: Canóvanas
- Time zone: UTC−4 (AST)

Palma Sola is a small neighborhood located on Puerto Rico Highway 957, a branch of Puerto Rico Highway 185, in Canóvanas, Puerto Rico.

== Location ==
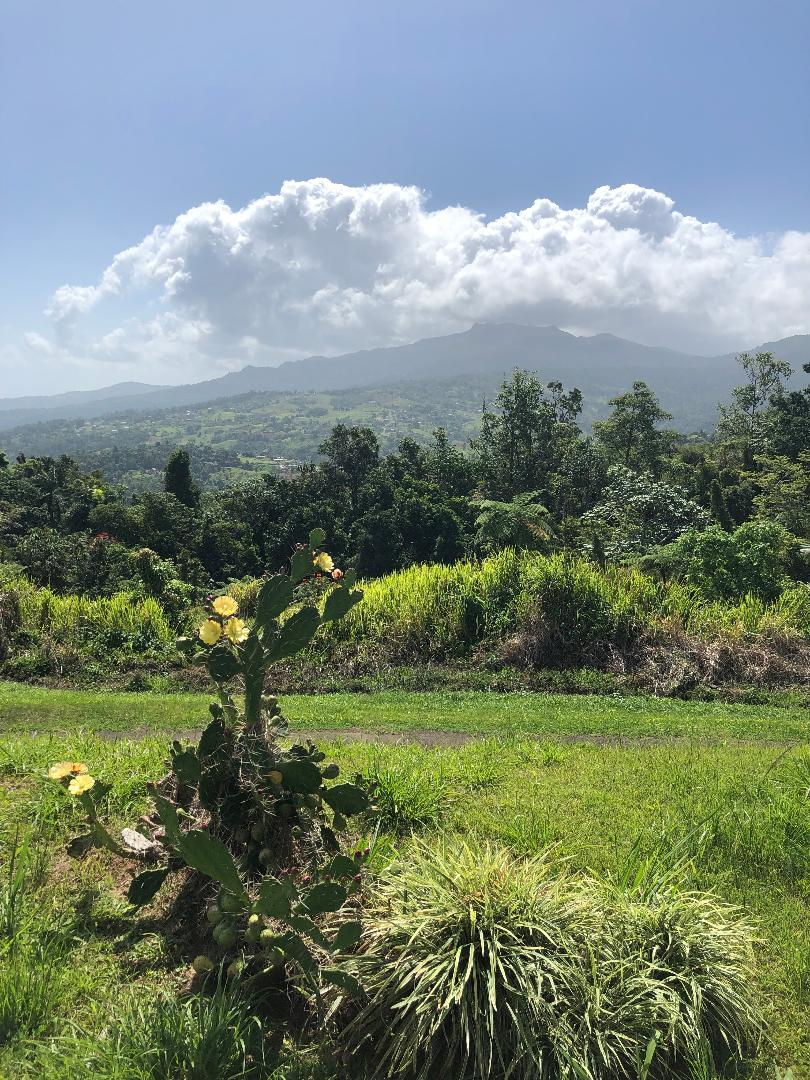
Palma Sola, sometimes called "Barrio Palma Sola"

Palma Sola is located on the northeastern side of the island, in the town of Canóvanas. It is north of Las Piedras, south of Loíza, east of Carolina and west of Río Grande. Palma Sola is a sector of Canóvanas along with other sectors such as: Alturas, Finca Poso, Las Magas, La Central, Lomas del Viento, Cambalache, Peniel and Sector El Hoyo.

== Hurricane Maria ==
In September 2017, Hurricane Maria destroyed the only bridge connecting the isolated community to a highway and all the sectors were left without electrical power. Six months later, when power was finally restored, the local evangelical church in Palma Sola showed their appreciation to subcontractors with a brunch.

== Crime wave ==
In early 2018, the police talked about a crime wave hitting the area when three murders took place within the first 15 days of the New Year. In May and July 2019, more shootings in Palma Sola were reported.

== See also ==
- List of communities in Puerto Rico
- List of barrios and sectors of Canóvanas, Puerto Rico
- Puerto Rico Office for Socioeconomic and Community Development
