= Cubuy, Canóvanas, Puerto Rico =

Barrio of Puerto Rico

Cubuy
- Barrio
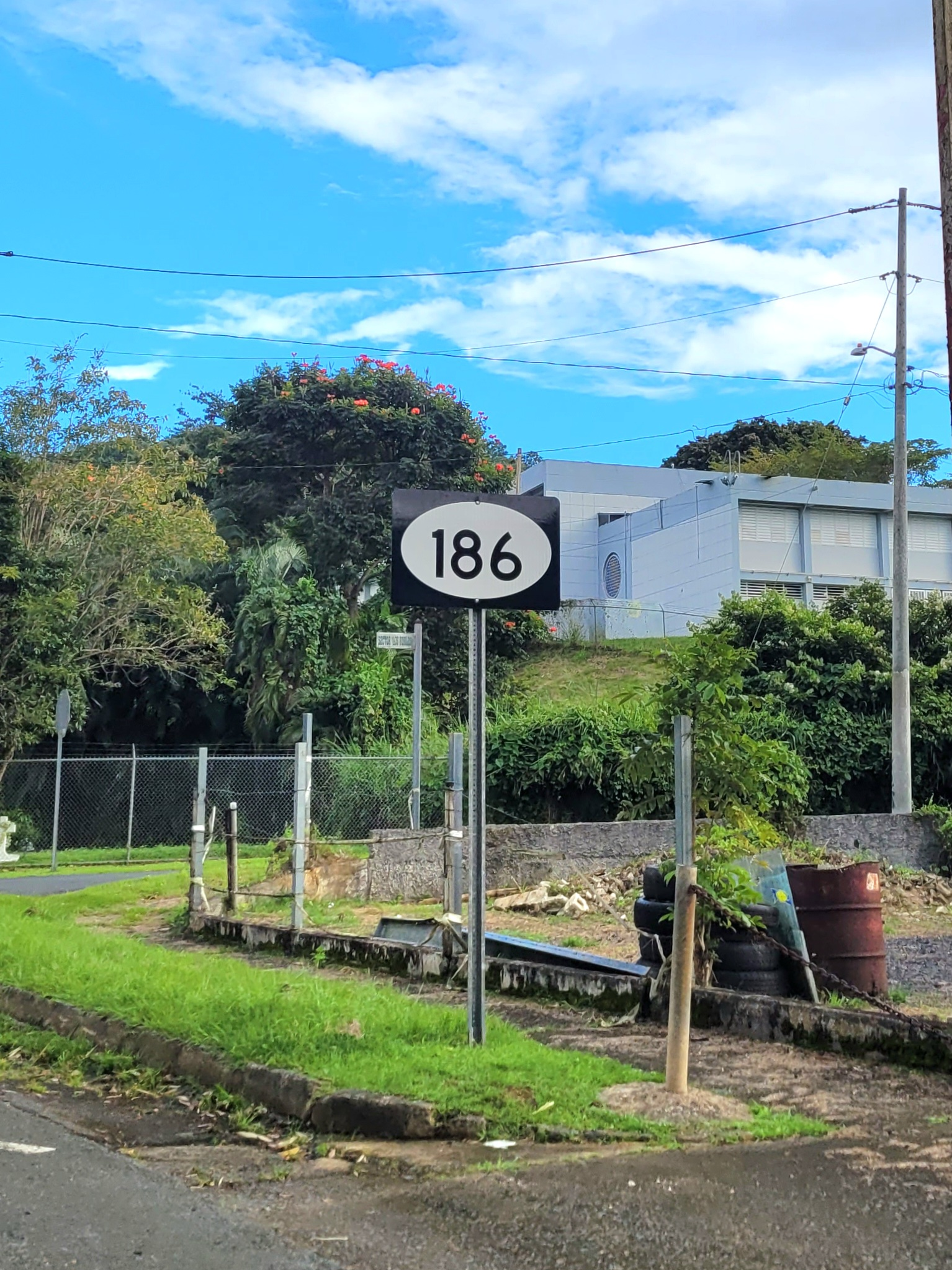
- Puerto Rico Highway 186 in Cubuy

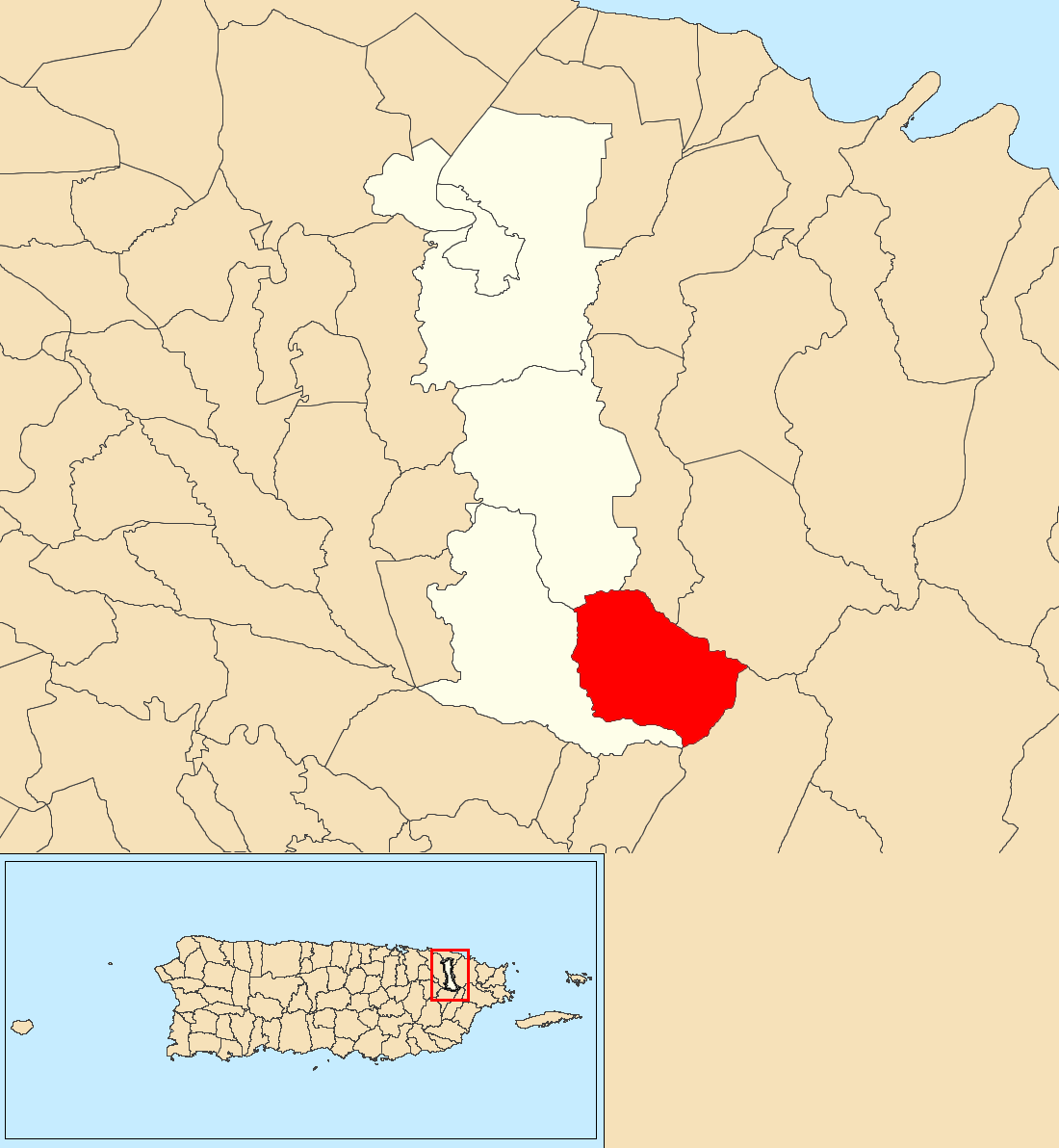
- Location of Cubuy within the municipality of Canóvanas shown in red

- Location of Puerto Rico
- Coordinates: 18°16′30″N 65°51′38″W
- Commonwealth: Puerto Rico
- Municipality: Canóvanas

Area
  - Total: 4.67 sq mi (12.1 km^{2})
  - Land: 4.67 sq mi (12.1 km^{2})
  - Water: 0.00 sq mi (0 km^{2})
- Elevation: 1,932 ft (589 m)

Population (2010)
  - Total: 1,841
  - Density: 394.2/sq mi (152.2/km^{2})
- Source: 2010 Census
- Time zone: UTC−4 (AST)

Cubuy is a barrio in the municipality of Canóvanas, Puerto Rico. Its population in 2010 was 1,841.

== History ==
Cubuy was in Spain's gazetteers until Puerto Rico was ceded by Spain in the aftermath of the Spanish–American War under the terms of the Treaty of Paris of 1898 and became an unincorporated territory of the United States. In 1899, the United States Department of War conducted a census of Puerto Rico finding that the population of Cubuy barrio was 1,225.

Historical population
| Census | Pop. | Note | %± |
|---|---|---|---|
| 1900 | 1,225 | | — |
| 1940 | 1,859 | | — |
| 1950 | 1,639 | | −11.8% |
| 1960 | 1,050 | | −35.9% |
| 1970 | 1,261 | | 20.1% |
| 1980 | 1,321 | | 4.8% |
| 1990 | 1,562 | | 18.2% |
| 2000 | 1,674 | | 7.2% |
| 2010 | 1,841 | | 10.0% |
U.S. Decennial Census; 1899 (shown as 1900) 1910-1930; 1930-1950 1980-2000 2010

== Sectors ==
Barrios (which are, in contemporary times, roughly comparable to minor civil divisions) in turn are further subdivided into smaller local populated place areas/units called sectores (sectors in English). The types of sectores may vary, from normally sector to urbanización to reparto to barriada to residencial, among others.

The following sectors are in Cubuy barrio:

Comunidad Villa Sin Miedo, Parcelas Benítez, Sector Añoranza (de Cubuy), Sector Condesa, Sector Cubuy Marines, Sector La Gallera, Sector Los Cafés, and Sector Los Pereira.

== See also ==
- List of communities in Puerto Rico
- List of barrios and sectors of Canóvanas, Puerto Rico
