= Canóvanas, Canóvanas, Puerto Rico =

Barrio of Puerto Rico

Canóvanas
- Barrio
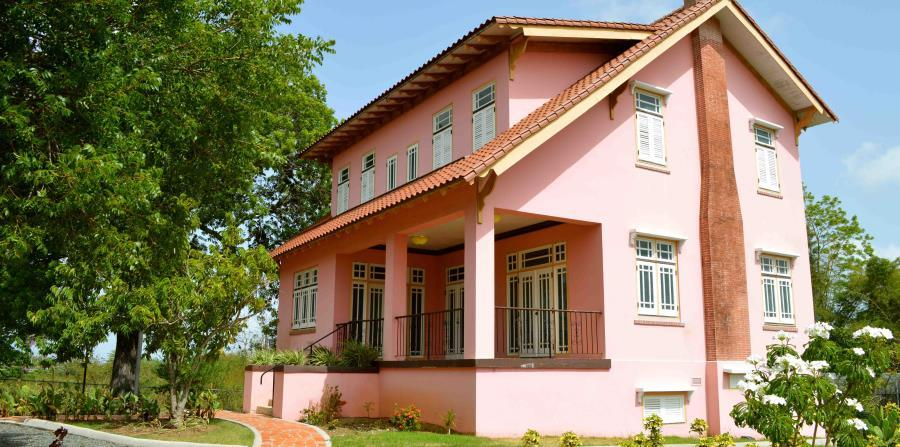
- Jesús T. Piñero House in Canóvanas barrio

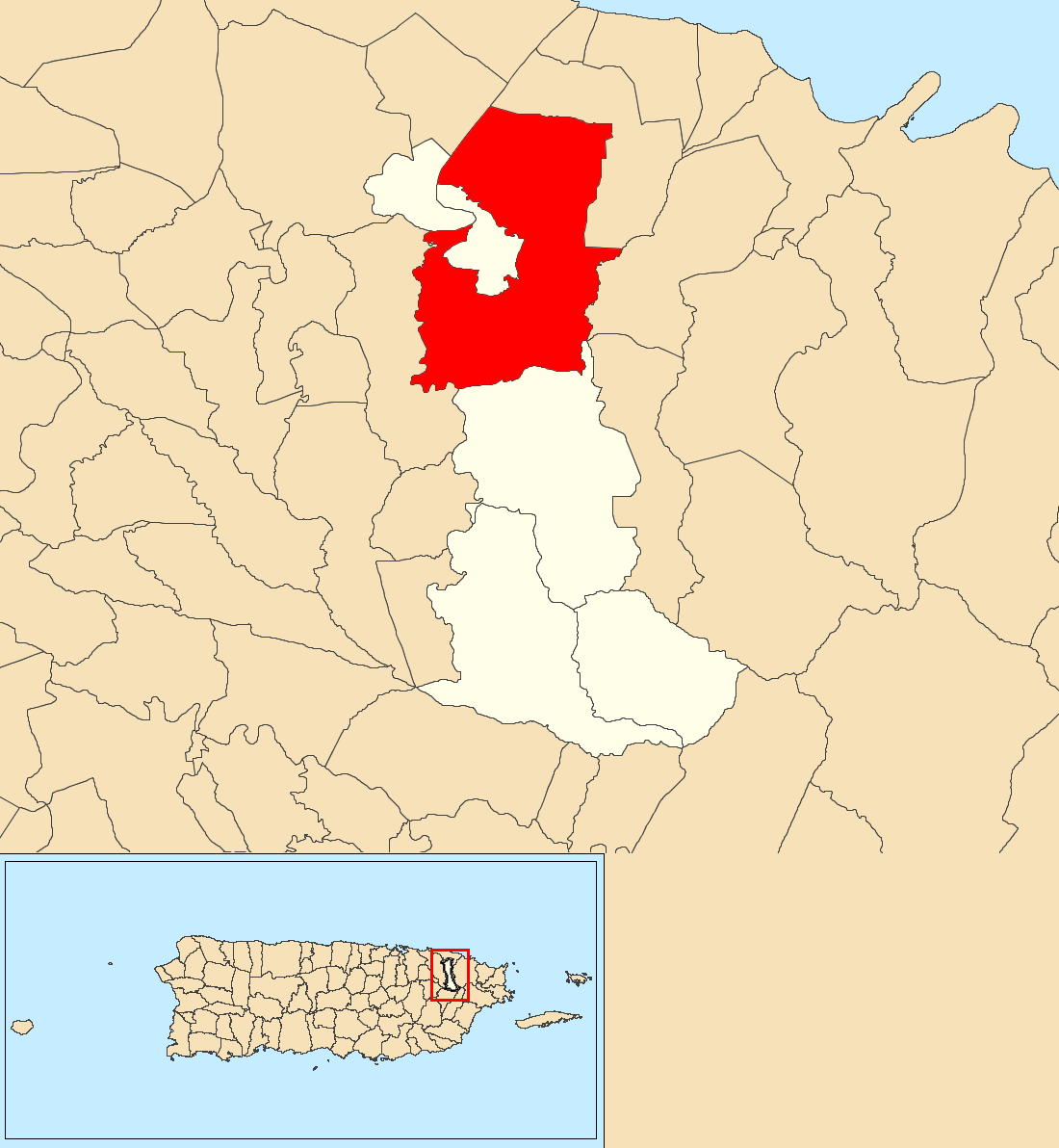
- Location of Canóvanas within the municipality of Canóvanas shown in red

- Location of Puerto Rico
- Coordinates: 18°23′49″N 65°54′33″W
- Commonwealth: Puerto Rico
- Municipality: Canóvanas

Area
  - Total: 10.25 sq mi (26.5 km^{2})
  - Land: 10.18 sq mi (26.4 km^{2})
  - Water: 0.07 sq mi (0.18 km^{2})
- Elevation: 92 ft (28 m)

Population (2010)
  - Total: 22,420
  - Density: 2,204.5/sq mi (851.2/km^{2})
- Source: 2010 Census
- Time zone: UTC−4 (AST)

Canóvanas is a barrio in the municipality of Canóvanas, Puerto Rico. Its population in 2010 was 22,420.

== History ==
Canóvanas was in Spain's gazetteers until Puerto Rico was ceded by Spain in the aftermath of the Spanish–American War under the terms of the Treaty of Paris of 1898 and became an unincorporated territory of the United States. In 1899, the United States Department of War conducted a census of Puerto Rico finding that the population of Canóvanas barrio was 1,942.

Historical population
Census	Pop.	Note	%±
1900	1,942		—
1970	0		—
1980	12,769		—
1990	14,108		10.5%
2000	17,464		23.8%
2010	22,420		28.4%
U.S. Decennial Census; 1899 (shown as 1900) 1910-1930; 1930-1950 1980-2000 2010

== Sectors ==
Barrios (which are, in contemporary times, roughly comparable to minor civil divisions) in turn are further subdivided into smaller local populated place areas/units called sectores (sectors in English). The types of sectores may vary, from normally sector to urbanización to reparto to barriada to residencial, among others.

The following sectors are in Canóvanas barrio:

Apartamentos Alborada, Apartamentos Ciudad Jardín, Barrio Cambalache, Barrio San Isidro, Condominios Park View Terrace, Estancias del Río, Hacienda de Canóvanas, Parcelas Viejas, Río Plantation, River Gardens, River Plantation, River Valley Park, River Valley Town Park, River Villas, Sector Dos Cuerdas, Sector Haciendas Cambalache, Sector Hipódromo El Comandante, Sector Los Bobos, Sector Los Pérez, Sector Los Sotos, Sector Valle Hills, Sector Villa Hugo I y II, Señorío de Gonzaga, Urbanización Ciudad Jardín (Walk Up), Urbanización Estancias de Campo Rico, Urbanización Forest Plantation, Urbanización Loíza Valley, Urbanización Mansiones del Tesoro, Urbanización River Valley, Urbanización Villas de Cambalache, and Urbanización Vistas de Río Grande.

These were in the San Isidro comunidad of Canóvanas: Comunidad, Estancias Tierra Alta, Extensión Quintas y Estancias de Jardines de Palmarejo, Parcelas Nuevas, Sector Las Delicias, Sector Monte Verde, Sector Sucusucu, Sector Villa Conquistador I y II, and Sector Villa Tiro.

== See also ==
- List of communities in Puerto Rico
- List of barrios and sectors of Canóvanas, Puerto Rico
