= Hato Puerco, Canóvanas, Puerto Rico =

Barrio of Puerto Rico

Hato Puerco
- Barrio
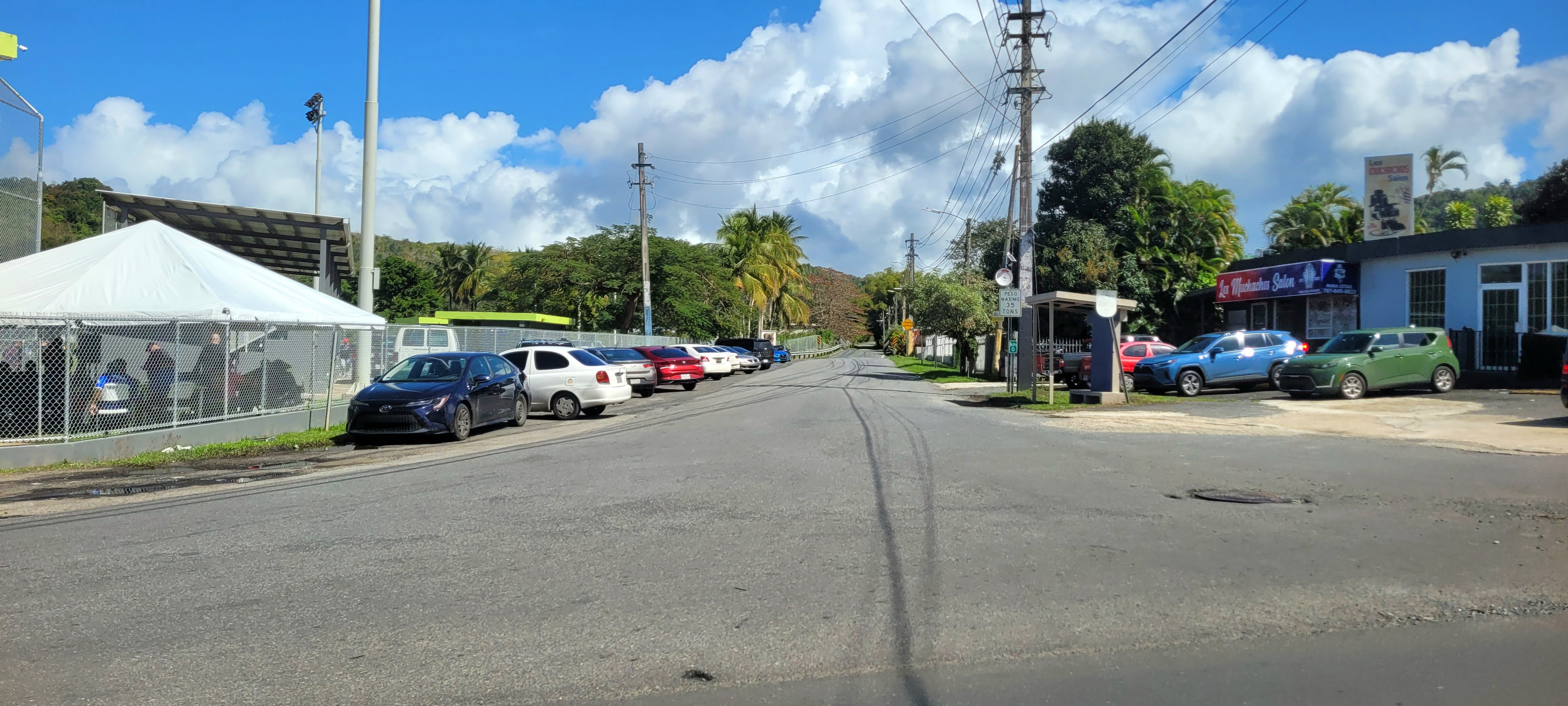
- Puerto Rico Highway 957 in Hato Puerco

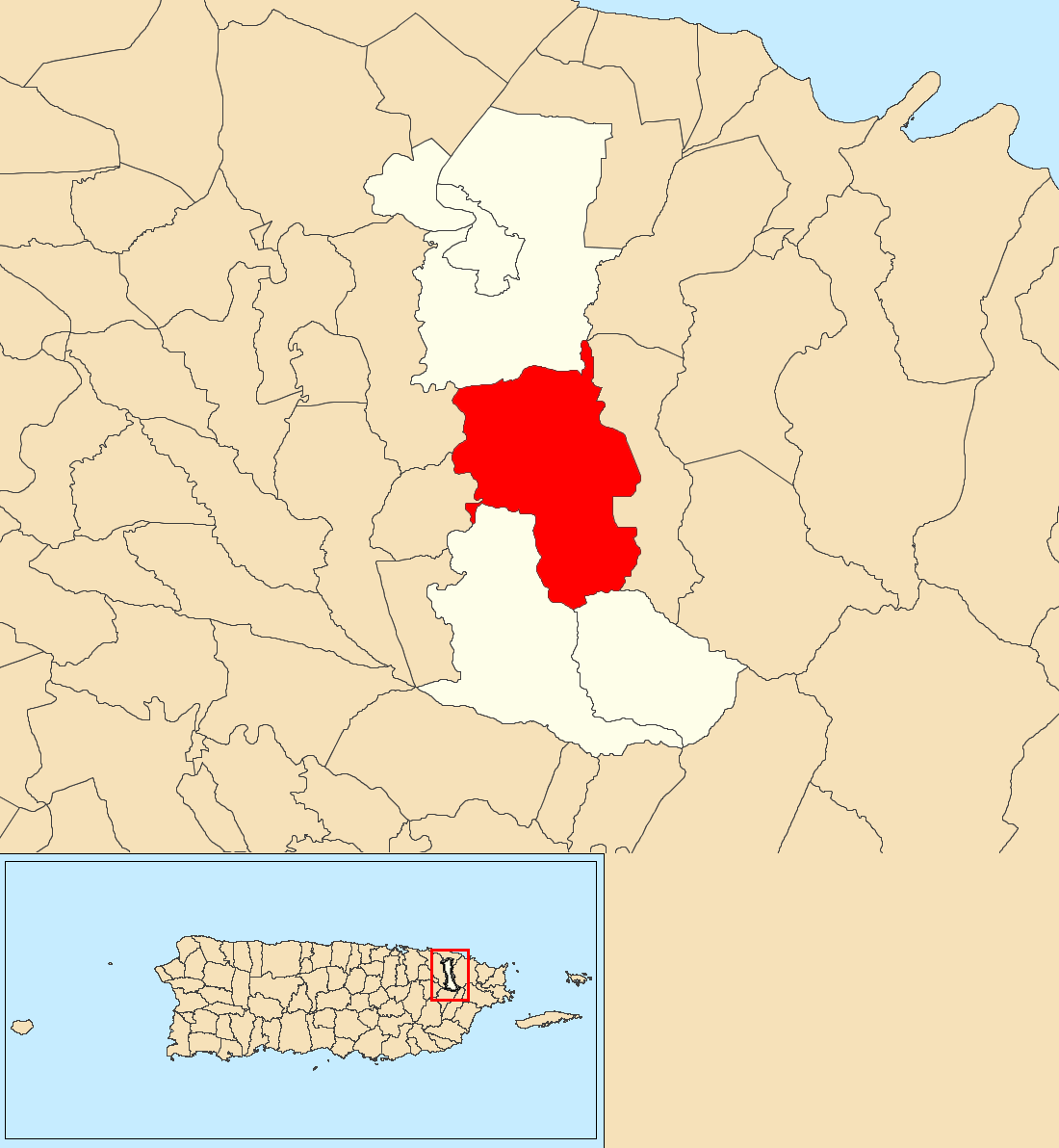
- Location of Hato Puerco within the municipality of Canóvanas shown in red

- Location of Puerto Rico
- Coordinates: 18°19′22″N 65°53′04″W
- Commonwealth: Puerto Rico
- Municipality: Canóvanas

Area
  - Total: 7.96 sq mi (20.6 km^{2})
  - Land: 7.96 sq mi (20.6 km^{2})
  - Water: 0.00 sq mi (0 km^{2})
- Elevation: 607 ft (185 m)

Population (2010)
  - Total: 7,379
  - Density: 927/sq mi (358/km^{2})
- Source: 2010 Census
- Time zone: UTC−4 (AST)

Hato Puerco is a barrio in the municipality of Canóvanas, Puerto Rico. Its population in 2010 was 7,379.

== History ==
Hato Puerco was in Spain's gazetteers until Puerto Rico was ceded by Spain in the aftermath of the Spanish–American War under the terms of the Treaty of Paris of 1898 and became an unincorporated territory of the United States. In 1899, the United States Department of War conducted a census of Puerto Rico finding that the population of Hato Puerco barrio, which was in the municipality of Loíza, was 3,139.

Historical population
Census	Pop.	Note	%±
1900	3,139		—
1940	3,555		—
1950	3,460		−2.7%
1960	3,689		6.6%
1970	4,417		19.7%
1980	4,866		10.2%
1990	6,793		39.6%
2000	7,361		8.4%
2010	7,379		0.2%
U.S. Decennial Census; 1899 (shown as 1900) 1910-1930; 1930-1950 1980-2000 2010

== Sectors ==
Barrios (which are, in contemporary times, roughly comparable to minor civil divisions) in turn are further subdivided into smaller local populated place areas/units called sectores (sectors in English). The types of sectores may vary, from normally sector to urbanización to reparto to barriada to residencial, among others.

The following sectors are in the Campo Rico comunidad of Hato Puerco barrio:

Camino Los Matos, Camino Los Navarro, Carretera 185, Finca Pozos, Parcelas Alturas de Campo Rico, Parcelas Campo Rico, Sector Belia, Sector Canovanillas, Sector Chorrito, Sector El Purgatorio, Sector Febo, Sector La Marina, Sector La Vega, Sector Loma del Viento, Sector Los González, Sector Maga, Sector Puente Moreno, Sector Toma de Agua, and Urbanización Las Haciendas.

The following sectors are in Palma Sola in Hato Puerco:

Carretera 957, Sector El Hoyo, Sector Los Castros, Sector Maga, and Sector Peniel.

== See also ==
- List of communities in Puerto Rico
- List of barrios and sectors of Canóvanas, Puerto Rico
