= Mamey, Juncos, Puerto Rico =

Barrio of Puerto Rico

Mamey
- Barrio
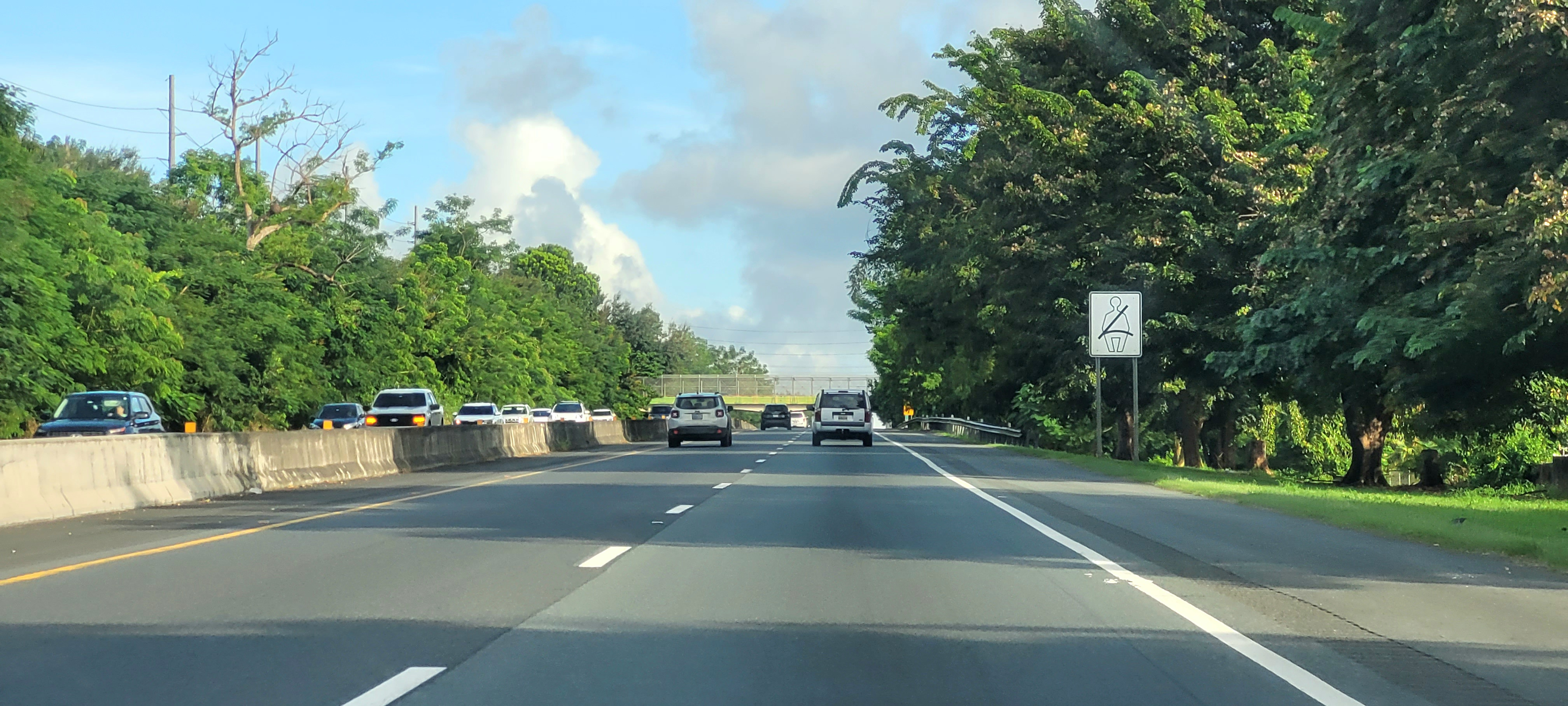
- Puerto Rico Highway 30 in Mamey

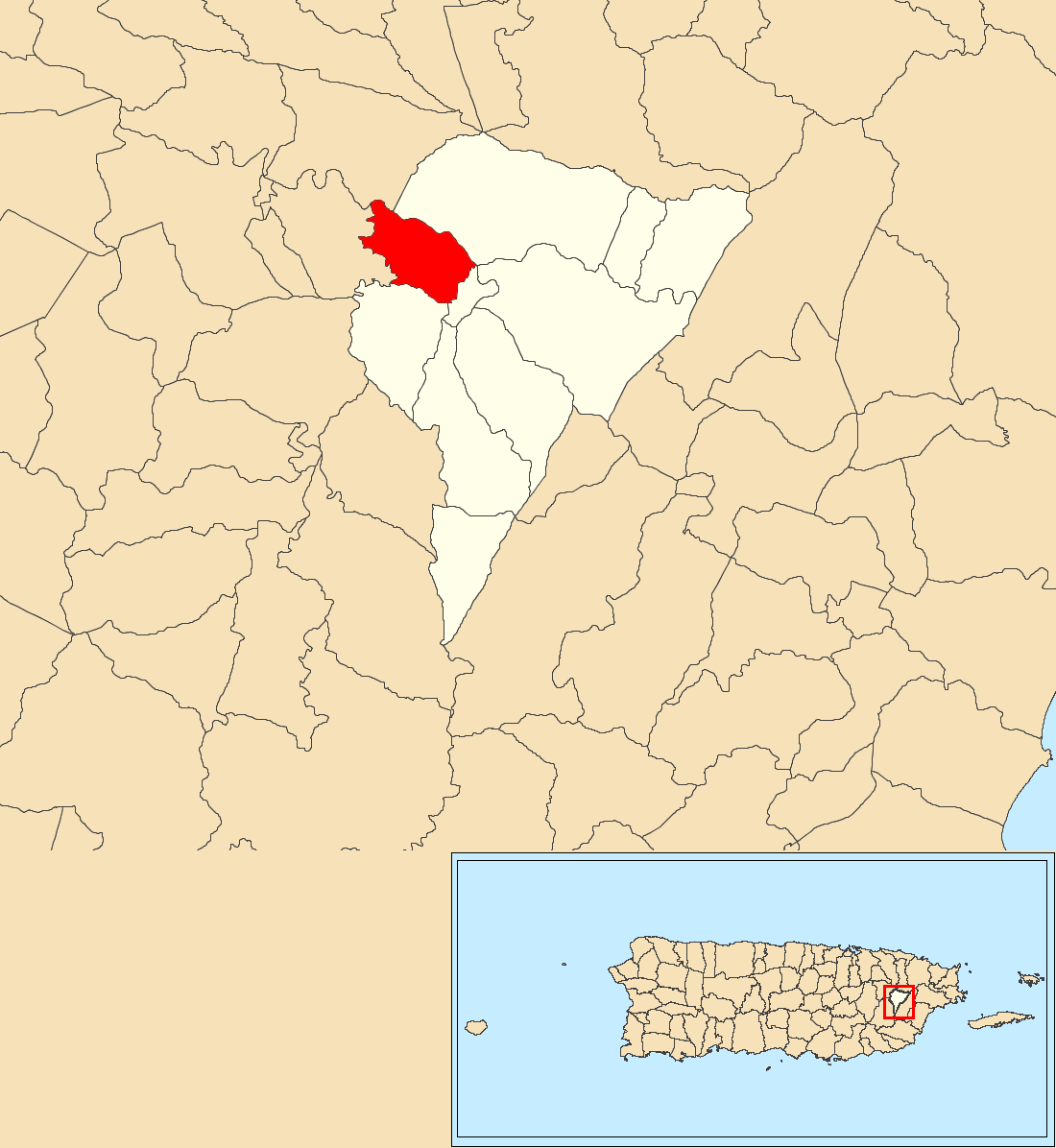
- Location of Mamey within the municipality of Juncos shown in red

- Location of Puerto Rico
- Coordinates: 18°14′13″N 65°56′12″W
- Commonwealth: Puerto Rico
- Municipality: Juncos

Area
  - Total: 1.67 sq mi (4.3 km^{2})
  - Land: 1.66 sq mi (4.3 km^{2})
  - Water: 0.01 sq mi (0.026 km^{2})
- Elevation: 266 ft (81 m)

Population (2010)
  - Total: 4,310
  - Density: 2,612.1/sq mi (1,008.5/km^{2})
- Source: 2010 Census
- Time zone: UTC−4 (AST)

Mamey is a barrio in the municipality of Juncos, Puerto Rico. Its population in 2010 was 4,310.

== History ==
Mamey was in Spain's gazetteers until Puerto Rico was ceded by Spain in the aftermath of the Spanish–American War under the terms of the Treaty of Paris of 1898 and became an unincorporated territory of the United States. In 1899, the United States Department of War conducted a census of Puerto Rico finding that the combined population of Mamey and Gurabo Abajo barrios was 1,679.

Historical population
Census	Pop.	Note	%±
1910	590		—
1920	788		33.6%
1930	1,020		29.4%
1940	1,854		81.8%
1950	1,249		−32.6%
1960	1,265		1.3%
1970	0		−100.0%
1980	2,931		—
1990	3,458		18.0%
2000	3,705		7.1%
2010	4,310		16.3%
U.S. Decennial Census; 1900 (N/A) 1910-1930; 1930-1950 1980-2000 2010

== See also ==
- List of communities in Puerto Rico
