= Villarán Bridge =

Historic place in Canóvanas, Puerto Rico

- U.S. National Register of Historic Places
- Puerto Rico Historic Sites and Zones
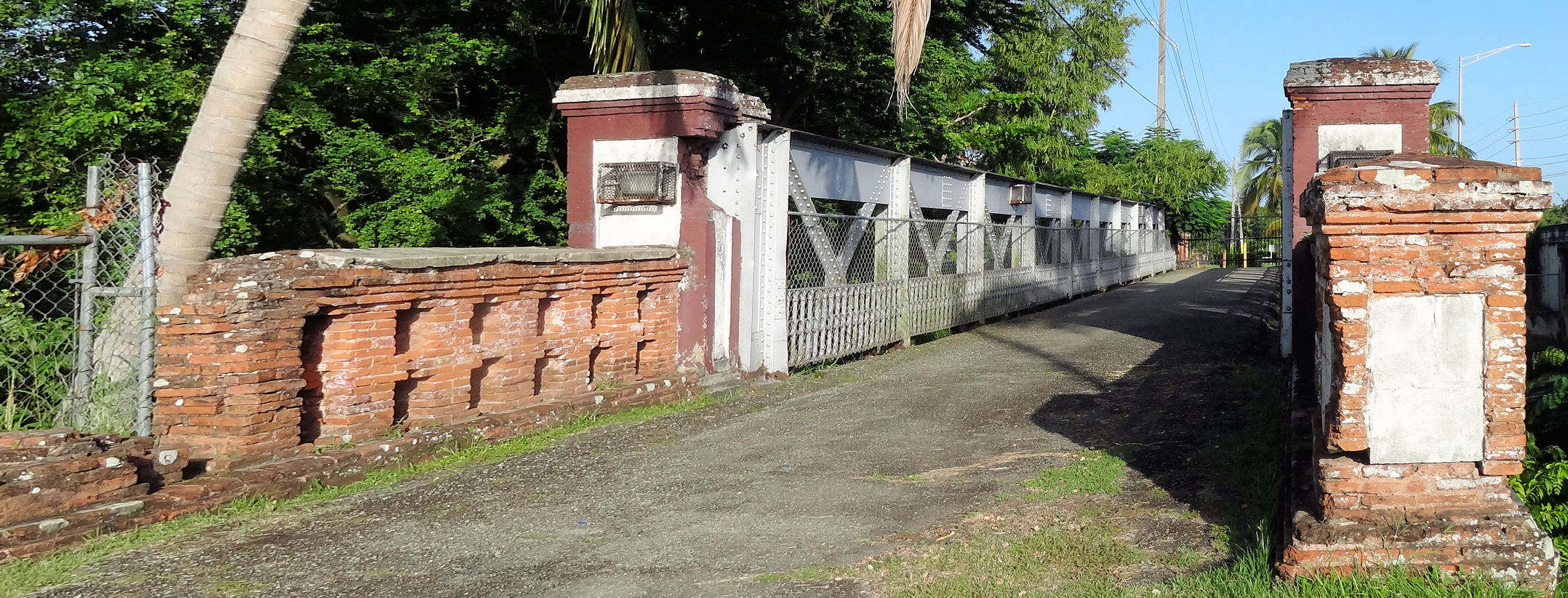
- The Villarán Bridge in 2012

- Location within Puerto Rico
- Location: Highway 9959, km 3 Canóvanas, Puerto Rico
- Coordinates: 18°22′45″N 65°53′32″W
- Area: 149.04 m^{2} (1,604.3 sq ft)
- Built: 1892
- Architectural style: Eiffel pony truss
- MPS: Historic Bridges of Puerto Rico MPS
- NRHP reference No.: 95000835
- RNSZH No.: 2000-(RMSJ)-00-JP-SH

Significant dates
- Added to NRHP: July 19, 1995
- Designated RNSZH: February 3, 2000

The Villarán Bridge (Spanish: Puente Villarán), also known as the Canóvanas Bridge, is a historic bridge over the Canóvanas River in Canóvanas, Puerto Rico. Built in 1892 on the highway between Río Piedras and Río Grande, its iron superstructure was imported from Europe and set on masonry abutments. It is the best-preserved example of an Eiffel pony truss bridge in Puerto Rico or the United States. By 1994, the bridge had been replaced by an adjacent span for vehicular use, but it remained open for pedestrian use.

The bridge was added to the U.S. National Register of Historic Places in 1995 and to the Puerto Rico Register of Historic Sites and Zones in 2000.

== See also ==
- National Register of Historic Places listings in Canóvanas, Puerto Rico
