= Gurabo Abajo =

Barrio of Juncos, Puerto Rico

- Barrio
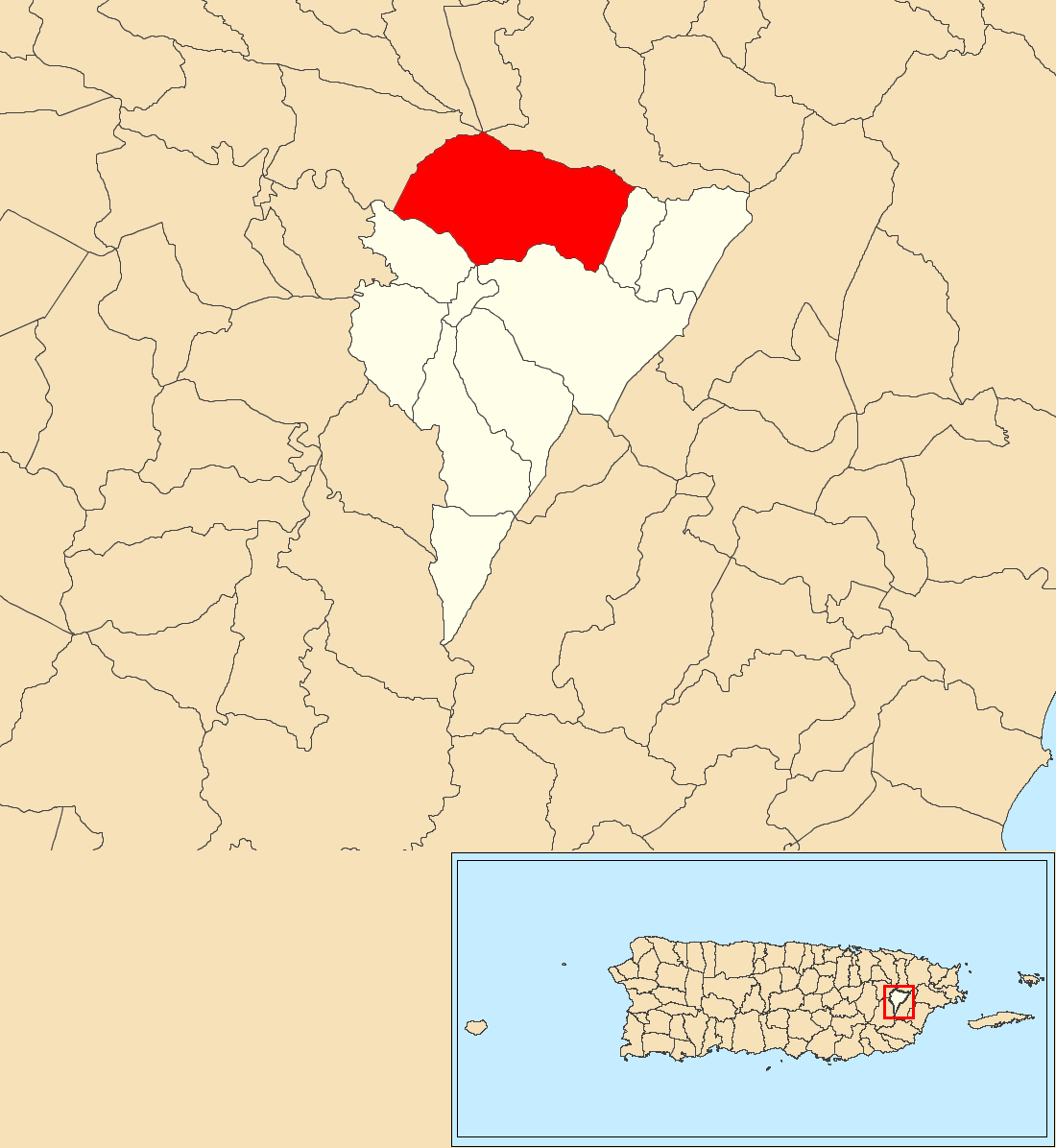
- Location of Gurabo Abajo within the municipality of Juncos shown in red

- Location of Puerto Rico
- Coordinates: 18°15′16″N 65°54′33″W
- Commonwealth: Puerto Rico
- Municipality: Juncos

Area
  - Total: 5.76 sq mi (14.9 km^{2})
  - Land: 5.72 sq mi (14.8 km^{2})
  - Water: 0.04 sq mi (0.10 km^{2})
- Elevation: 430 ft (130 m)

Population (2010)
  - Total: 4,857
  - Density: 849.1/sq mi (327.8/km^{2})
- Source: 2010 Census
- Time zone: UTC−4 (AST)

Gurabo Abajo is a barrio in the municipality of Juncos, Puerto Rico. Its population in 2010 was 4,857.

== History ==
Gurabo Abajo was in Spain's gazetteers until Puerto Rico was ceded by Spain in the aftermath of the Spanish–American War under the terms of the Treaty of Paris of 1898 and became an unincorporated territory of the United States. In 1899, the United States Department of War conducted a census of Puerto Rico finding that the combined population of Mamey and Gurabo Abajo barrios was 1,679.

Historical population
Census	Pop.	Note	%±
1910	1,377		—
1920	1,759		27.7%
1930	2,602		47.9%
1940	2,754		5.8%
1950	2,795		1.5%
1960	2,825		1.1%
1970	2,575		−8.8%
1980	2,900		12.6%
1990	3,208		10.6%
2000	3,731		16.3%
2010	4,857		30.2%
U.S. Decennial Census; 1900 (N/A) 1910-1930; 1930-1950 1980-2000 2010

== See also ==
- List of communities in Puerto Rico
