= Villa sin Miedo =

Community in Puerto Rico

Coordinates: 18.256°N 65.873°W

Villa Sin Miedo is a community near Río Grande, Puerto Rico. It made national headlines in Puerto Rico during a number of raids in the early 1980s, including one in which a policeman was shot to his death.

== History ==
Villa Sin Miedo was a community of about 300 families that occupied a place called Dolores Farm. They established their community on government land in November 1980 but it was razed by police on May 18, 1982, amid violent clashes where a policeman was shot and killed.

== Villa Sin Miedo in the exhibition Contrasts by Jack and Irene Delano ==
Historian and writer Ana Juarbe writes in an article titled "Imposing the Past on the Present: History, the Public, and the Columbus Quincentenary" about the photographs of Villa Sin Miedo in Jack Delano's exhibition that "despite US citizenship, Puerto Rican national sentiment is convincingly expressed by land rescuers from a community known as "Villa Sin Miedo".

== Villa Sin Miedo in the book Puerto Rico Mio: Four decades of Change photographs by Jack Delano ==
In the book Puerto Rico Mio are two photographs of Villa Miedo from 1982. The caption on the first photograph reads "1982 - Villa Sin Miedo, an illegal community of homeless squatters, near Carolina; a few days after this picture was taken the people were ejected by the police and the houses burned." The caption on the second photograph (pg 143) there is a picture of a resident of Villa Sin Miedo inside of a room of a house. The caption reads "1982 - One of the squatters in the community known as Villa Sin Miedo near Carolina."

In the first photo can be seen around twenty five wooden houses. They are arranged around a central dirt road that appears from the left side of the image and unfolds up towards a hill that reaches the horizon and meets a distant mountain scape. Six motor vehicles and a couple handfuls of people can be seen in that photo.

In the second photo a resident is seated on a bed inside a small room. A Puerto Rican flag covers half of the wall to his back.

== Villa Sin Miedo on the web ==
On October 15, 2007, a video compilation of images of "Villas sin miedo y villas del sol" was uploaded to YouTube by kelekasherebo. The video shows photographs of the brutality of confrontations with the police. And the continuation of the communities despite the attacks.

On October 20, 2007, the video appears in Indymedia's website
