= Canóvanas, Puerto Rico =

Town and municipality in Puerto Rico

Canóvanas Municipio de Canóvanas
- Town and Municipality
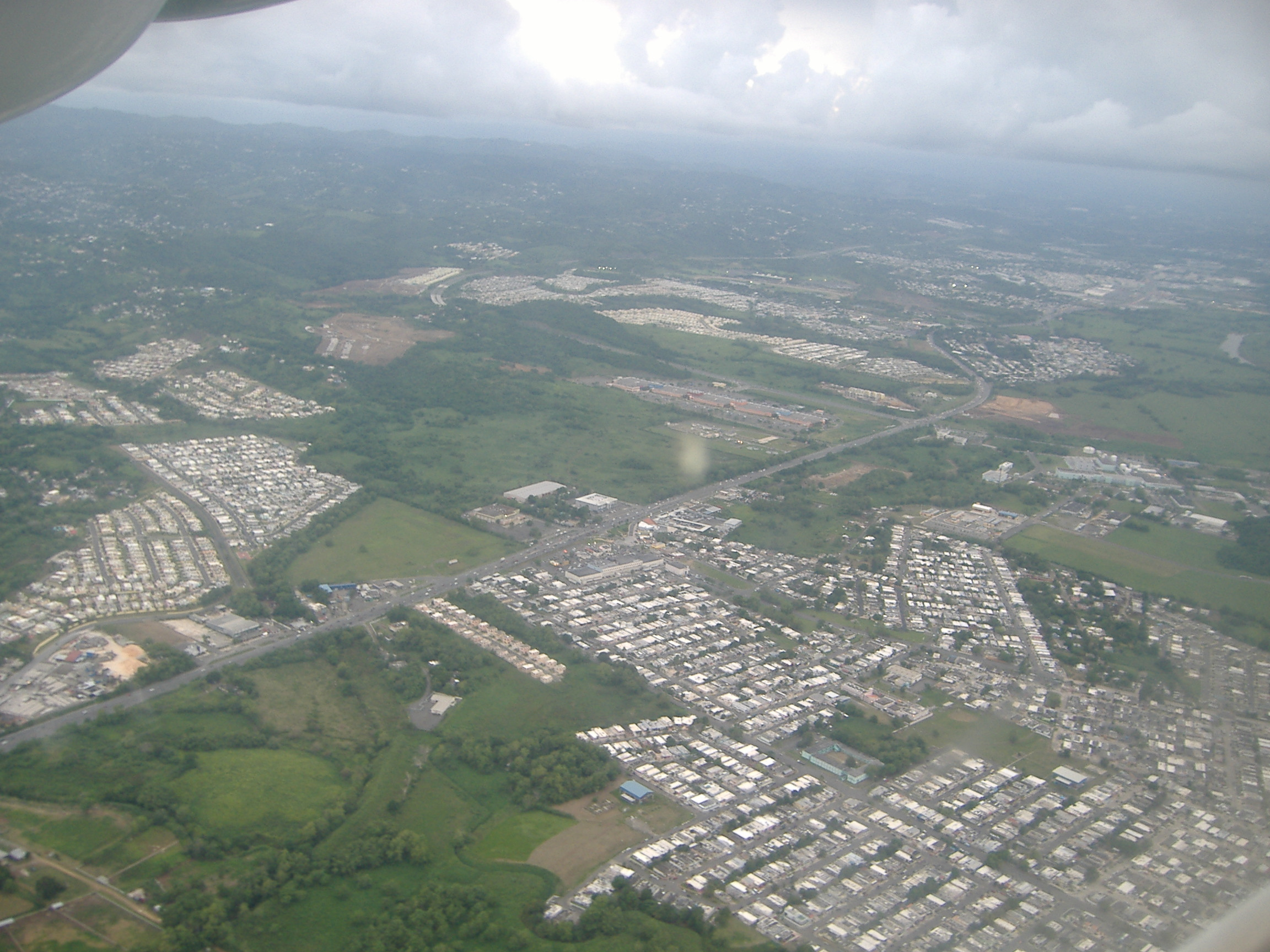
- Aerial view of PR-3 passing through Canóvanas

- Flag Coat of arms
- Nicknames: "Pueblo Valeroso", "Ciudad de los Indios", "La Ciudad de las Carreras", "El Pueblo del Chupacabras"
- Anthem: "Canóvanax"
- Map of Puerto Rico highlighting Canóvanas Municipality
- Coordinates: 18°22′45″N 65°54′5″W
- Sovereign state: United States
- Commonwealth: Puerto Rico
- Settled: late 18th century
- Founded: August 15, 1909
- Founder: Luis Hernaiz Veronne
- Barrios: 6 barrios: Canóvanas; Canóvanas barrio-pueblo; Cubuy; Hato Puerco; Lomas; Torrecilla Alta

Government
  - Mayor: Lornna Soto (PNP)
  - Senatorial dist.: 8 – Carolina
  - Representative dist.: 37, 38

Area
  - Total: 28.23 sq mi (73.12 km^{2})
  - Land: 28 sq mi (73 km^{2})
  - Water: 0.046 sq mi (.12 km^{2})

Population (2020)
  - Total: 42,337
  - Estimate (2025): 41,302 ▼
  - Rank: 19th in Puerto Rico
  - Density: 1,500/sq mi (580/km^{2})
- Demonym: Canovanenses
- Time zone: UTC−4 (AST)
- ZIP Code: 00729
- Area code: 787/939

Canóvanas (Spanish pronunciation: [kaˈnoβanas], locally [kaˈnoβanaʔ]) is a town and municipality in Puerto Rico, located in the northeastern region, north of Juncos and Las Piedras; south of Loíza; east of Carolina; and west of Río Grande. Canóvanas is spread over 6 barrios and Canóvanas Pueblo (the downtown area and administrative center). It is part of the San Juan-Caguas-Guaynabo Metropolitan Statistical Area.

== History ==
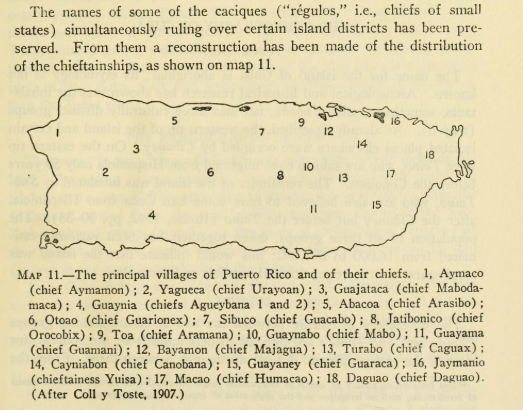
Early 20th c. map published by the Smithsonian Institution Bureau of American Ethnology showing the Cayniabon area under Chief Canobana

The region of what is now Canóvanas belonged to the Taíno region of Cayniabón, also the native name of the Grande de Loiza River, which stretched from the central eastern region of Puerto Rico to the northeast coast of the island. The region was led by cacique Canobaná, from which the actual name is derived, in the south half, and female Cacica Loaiza in the north (mostly modern day Loíza). During the Spanish colonization, the region of Canóvanas was granted to Miguel Díaz, who turned the Taíno yucayeque into a ranch. It is said that Canóbana, along with Loaiza, were supporters of the Spanish regime and did not join the Taino rebellion of 1511.

Canóvanas was a barrio (district) of the municipality of Loíza for over 400 years. In 1902, the Legislative Assembly of Puerto Rico approved a law for the consolidation of certain municipalities. As a result, both Canóvanas and Loíza were incorporated into the municipality of Río Grande. However, in 1905 a new law revoked the previous one, returning Canóvanas to its previous state of barrio of Loíza.

In 1909, the Municipal administration of Loíza was transferred to the barrio of Canóvanas, which was more developed than the Loíza region. Also, the construction of the PR-3 facilitated the communication with Canóvanas. As a result of the transfer, land was acquired to build a new city hall, a town square, a slaughterhouse, and a cemetery. A 20-acre (8.1 ha) plot of land was purchased by Don Luis Hernaiz Veronne, a townhall senator and local farmer. The site location was strategic, to intercept traffic from the PR-3, and from other nearby roads like the PR-185.

However, the transfer was not well received by the residents of the original town of Loíza, then renamed Loiza Aldea. It was not until a law was passed on June 30, 1969, that both municipalities were recognized as having "clearly different population nuclei" recommending the establishment of two separate municipalities. The change was approved in 1970 by Governor Luis A. Ferré.

Like other nearby towns, the proximity of Canóvanas to the capital, San Juan, has allowed extraordinary urban and commercial development in the region. The municipality became renown in the 1990s for popularizing the urban legend of the chupacabras.

Hurricane Maria on September 20, 2017, triggered numerous landslides, and caused catastrophic damages in Canóvanas. Five cases of Leptospirosis were reported in Canóvanas.

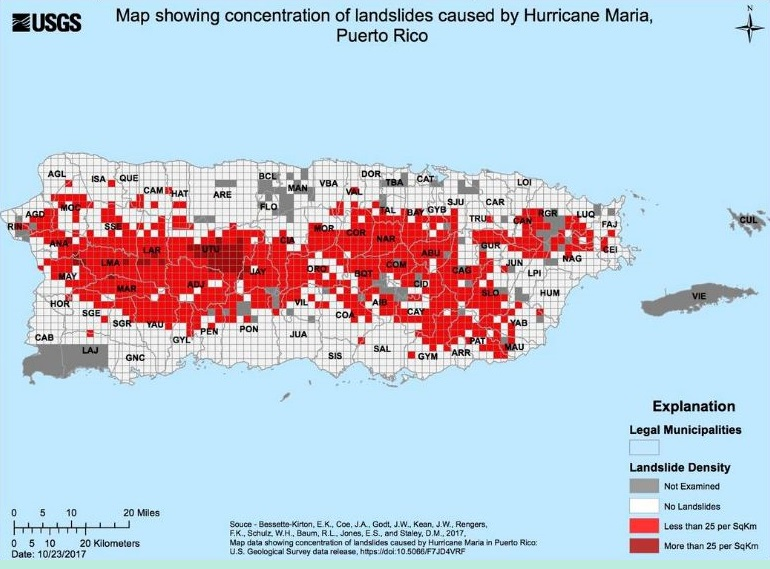
Map of landslides caused by María

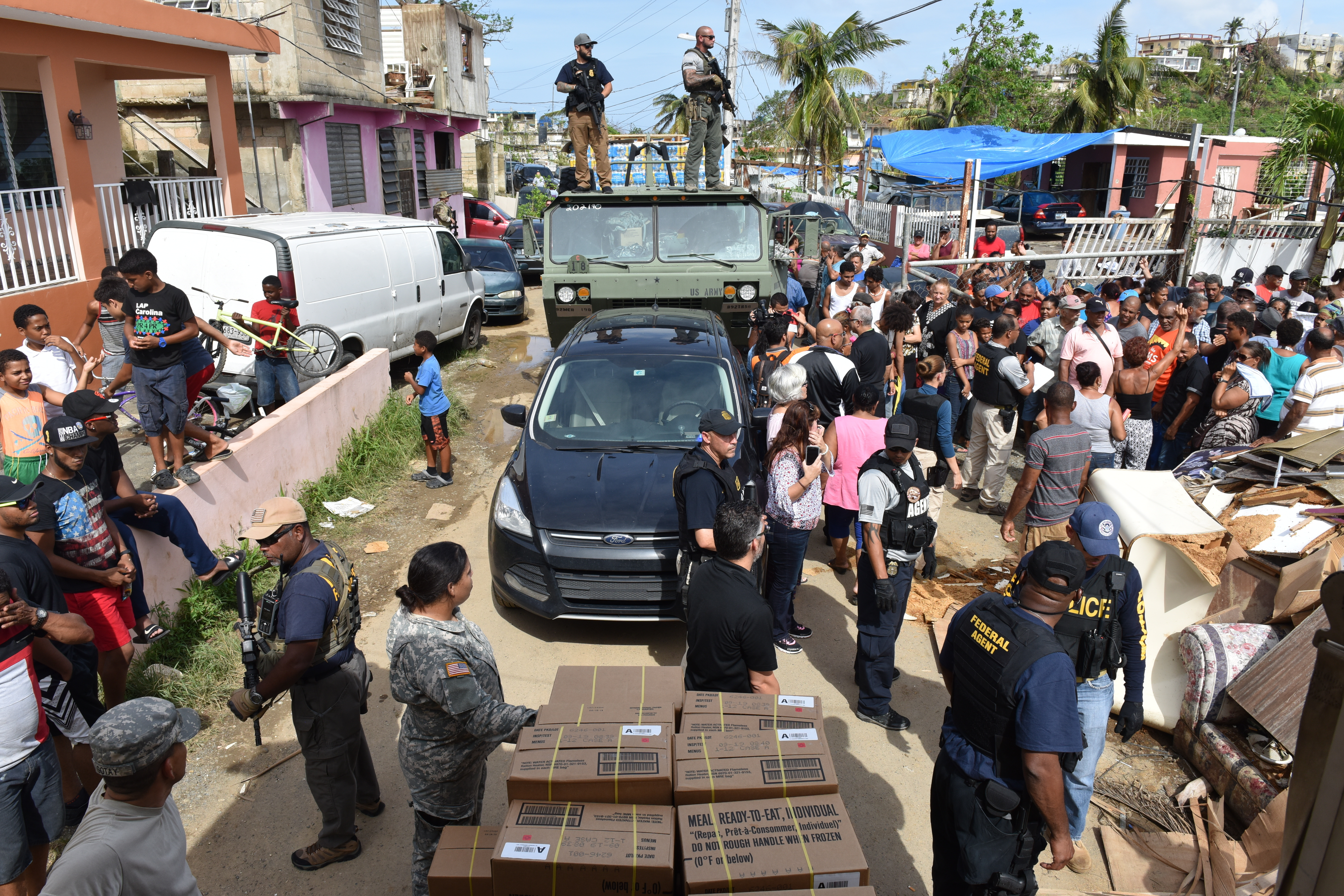
More than 400 people from Canóvanas awaiting relief

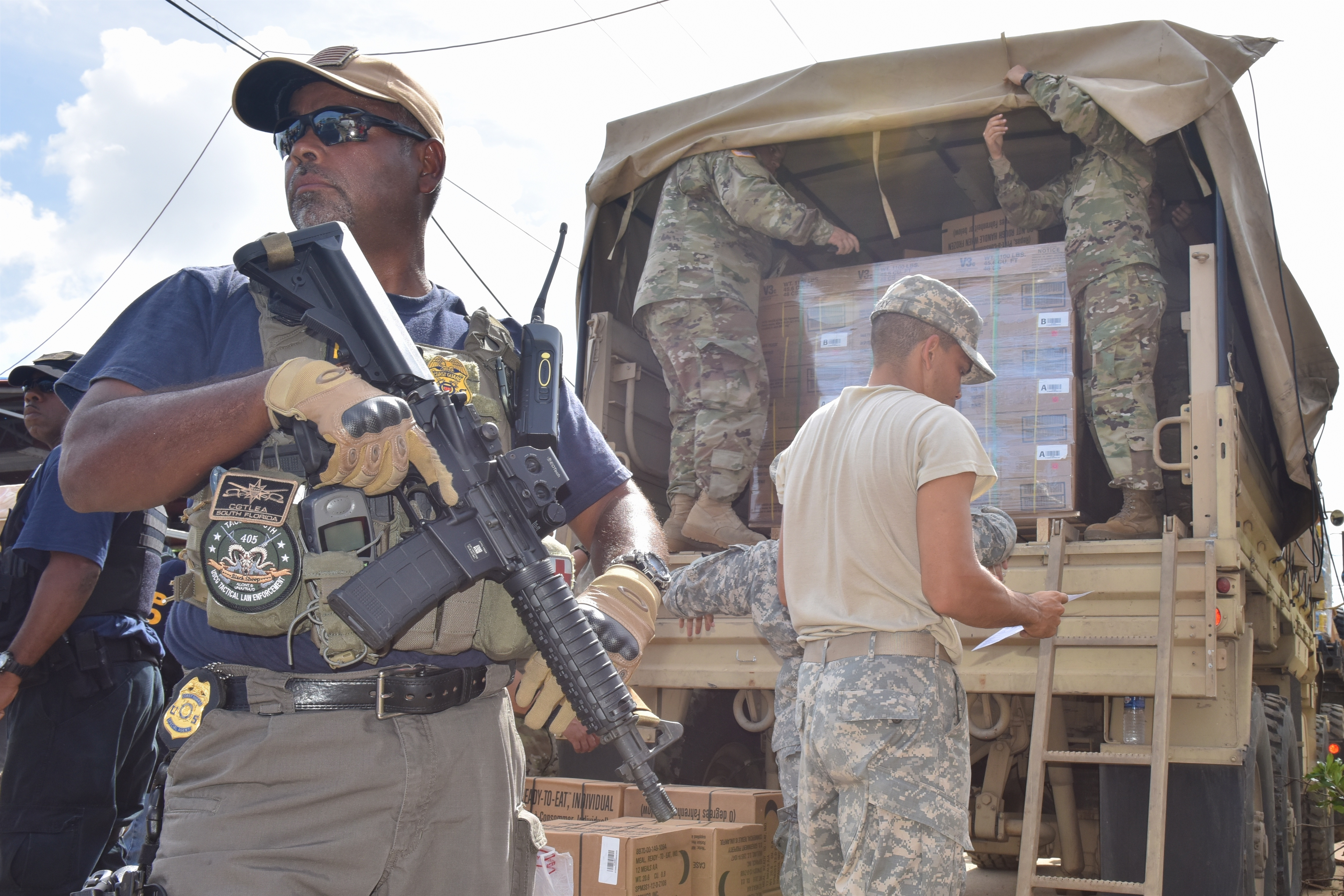
Armed petty officer guarding relief for residents of Canóvanas on Oct. 17, 2017

== Geography ==
Canóvanas sits on the Northern Coastal Plain region of Puerto Rico. It is bordered by the municipalities of Loíza, Río Grande, Las Piedras, Juncos, Gurabo, and Carolina. Canóvanas covers only 28 square miles (72.8 km^{2}).

Canóvanas combines flat alluvial plains in the center and north, areas with both gentle hills and rugged, deeply dissected mountainous areas made up of volcaniclastic rocks (lava flows and exposed intrusive igneous rocks) to the southeast and south. The Cuchilla de Santa Inés, a karstic limestone hill (mogote) with an elevation of 328 feet, rises from coastal sediments on the northeast of the municipality near San Isidro, while the Cuchilla El Asomante lies at the south with elevations that range from 656 to 2,296 feet.

On the southeast, Canóvanas features portions of the Sierra de Luquillo mountain range, with the Cerro El Negro being the tallest peak in the municipality at 2,592 feet. Other notable peaks are La Peregrina (1,903 feet) and Pitahaya (951 feet), both located at Barrio Hato Puerco.

=== Water features ===
Much of the flat plains are part of the flood-prone alluvial valley of the Río Grande de Loíza and its main tributaries, the Río Canóvanas and Río Canovanillas. Floods are typical during the storm season, between June and November. Other important tributaries are the Río Herrera and Río Cubuy, as well as numerous creeks.

=== Barrios ===
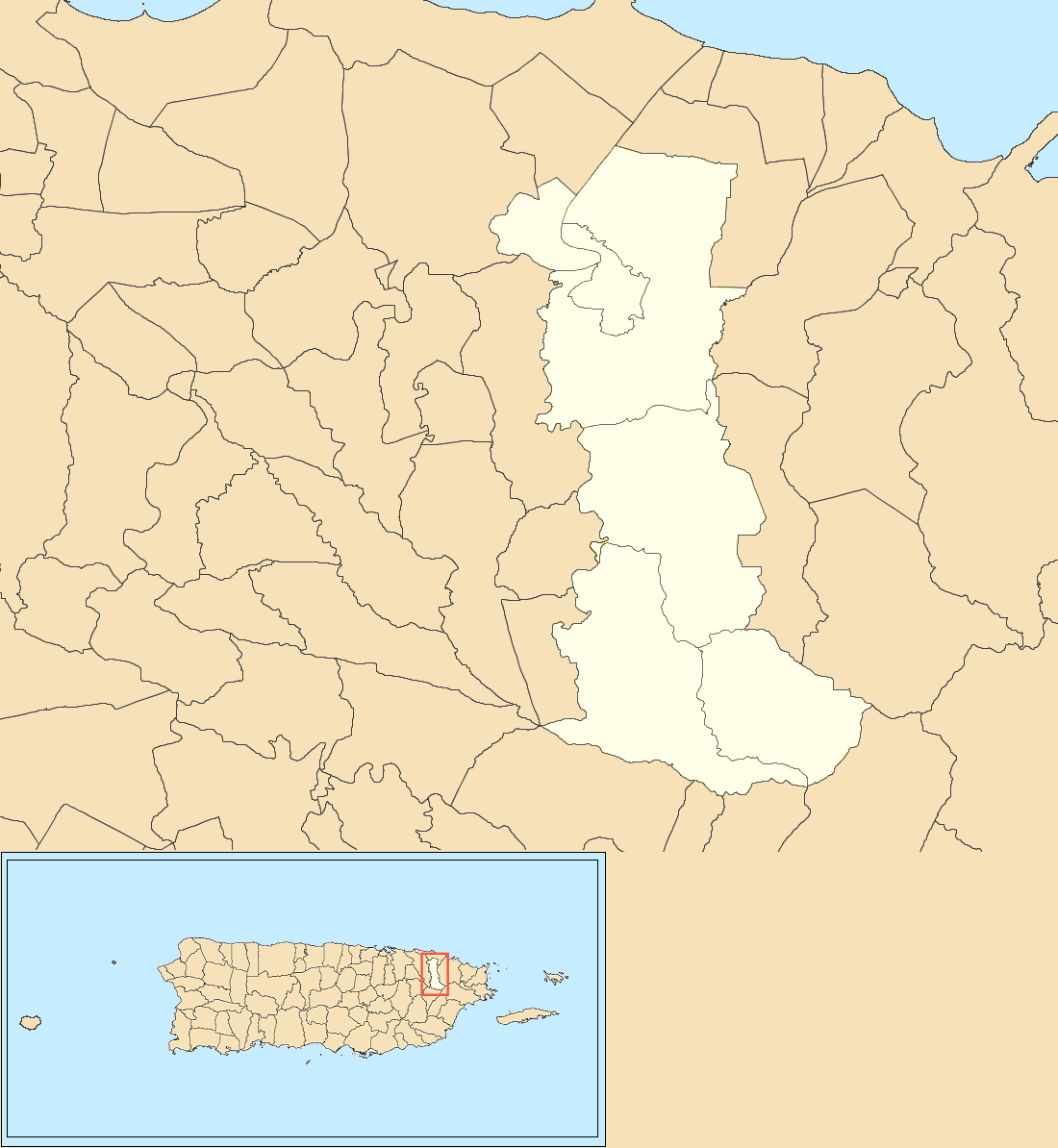
Subdivisions of Canóvanas.

Like all municipalities of Puerto Rico, Canóvanas is subdivided into barrios. The municipal buildings, central square and large Catholic church are located in a small barrio referred to as "el pueblo", near the center of the municipality.

1. Canóvanas
2. Canóvanas barrio-pueblo
3. Cubuy
4. Hato Puerco
5. Lomas
6. Torrecilla Alta

The urban center of Canóvanas is located at the crossroads of Road PR-3 (65th Infantry former military road), historically the main road between San Juan and Fajardo and Road PR-185, historically the main road between Loiza and the Central Caguas-Juncos Valley towns of Juncos and Gurabo.

=== Sectors ===
Barrios (which are, in contemporary times, roughly comparable to minor civil divisions) are further subdivided into smaller areas called sectores (sectors in English). The types of sectores may vary, from normally sector to urbanización to reparto to barriada to residencial, among others.

=== Special Communities ===
Comunidades Especiales de Puerto Rico (Special Communities of Puerto Rico) are marginalized communities whose citizens are experiencing a certain amount of social exclusion. A map shows these communities occur in nearly every municipality of the commonwealth. Of the 742 places that were on the list in 2014, the following barrios, communities, sectors, or neighborhoods were in Canóvanas: Cambalache, Jardines de Palmarejo, Sector Quintas, Sector Pueblo Indio, Sector Sierra Maestra, La Central, Sector Villa Borinquén, Las Cuatrocientas, Las Lomas, Palma Sola, Parcelas Nuevas in San Isidro, Parcelas Viejas in San Isidro, Sector Alturas de Campo Rico, Sector Los Navarros, Sector Monte Verde, Sector Valle Hills, Sector Villa Delicias, Villa Conquistador II, Villa Hugo 1, Villa Hugo II, and Villa Sin Miedo.

== Demographics ==
Historical population
| Census | Pop. | Note | %± |
|---|---|---|---|
| 1980 | 31,880 | | — |
| 1990 | 36,816 | | 15.5% |
| 2000 | 43,335 | | 17.7% |
| 2010 | 47,648 | | 10.0% |
| 2020 | 42,337 | | −11.1% |
| 2025 (est.) | 41,302 | ▼ | −2.4% |
U.S. Decennial Census; 1980–2000 2010 2020

Official population records for Canóvanas start in 1980, after the municipality was officially separated from Loíza. In 30 years, the population has increased by almost 50% according to the 2010 census.

According to the 2010 Census, 61% of the population identifies themselves as white, and 21.6% as black. Also, 48.6% of the population identified themselves as males, and 51.4% as females. Finally, 26.7% of the population is under 18 years old. The next biggest percentage of population (21.5%) is between 35 and 49 years old.

== Tourism ==
Although Canóvanas is not particularly known for its touristic importance, there are several landmarks and places of interest to visit. The Jesús T. Piñero House is located along the PR-3. The residence, which was built around 1931, houses a museum dedicated to the life of Jesús T. Piñero, first Puerto Rican governor of the island.

The Hipódromo Camarero is also a tourist attraction for horserace enthusiasts of the island and the Caribbean. Other places of interest are the ruins of the Canóvanas Sugar Mill, El Español Bridge, the Old Ceiba Tree, and Villarán Park, which features the historic Villarán Bridge, the only one of its kind in Puerto Rico and the United States.

To stimulate local tourism, the Puerto Rico Tourism Company launched the Voy Turistiendo ("I'm Touring") campaign, with a passport book and website. The Canóvanas page lists Pico el Toro, El Hipódromo and the Pueblo with its historic architecture, as places of interest.

== Economy ==
=== Agriculture ===
The economy of Canóvanas has traditionally relied on agriculture, primarily sugarcane and coffee. There was an important sugar mill located in the PR-951 from Canóvanas to Loíza. It belonged to Loíza Sugar Company, and then to Fajardo Sugar Company. However, the mill closed in 1965. In 1999, the structure was declared of historical importance by the Legislative Assembly of Puerto Rico. There's also growth of minor vegetables and fruits, as well as a minor cattle and poultry industry. Most of Canóvanas flat areas are subject to occasional flooding and are used as pastures for cattle.

Best Iguana Puerto Rico Meat in Canóvanas is the only company in Puerto Rico certified for processing, packaging and distributing iguana meat. The green iguana is an invasive species of Puerto Rico.

=== Commerce ===
In recent years, Canóvanas economy has shifted to commerce and industry, supplemented by the production of fresh milk. There has also been an increase in retail businesses. There are three main shopping malls, located along the PR-3 in the Canóvanas region. These malls such as The Outlet 66 Mall are the location of main stores like Wal-Mart, Marshalls, Burlington, and others.

Canóvanas is referred to as "The Door to the East" due to its location on the eastern edge of the San Juan Metropolitan Area sprawl, and its proximity to the northeast region of Puerto Rico. Also the expansion of Route 66 has sparked new interest in Canóvanas as an industrial and commercial sector. Recently the largest local supermarket chain brand Econo, has started the construction of its consolidated operations facilities with the construction of a super complex which will have the administrative headquarters, cold storage warehouse and main storages.

The municipal government has an economic development plan called Canovanas Opened for Business in which it provides fast legal and permit assistance, tax breaks and incentives for new commercial opportunities moving or establishing their businesses in Canóvanas. This has prompted the emergence of new small businesses and high demand for professional and technical services.

=== Industrial ===
The industrial sector is growing with large international pharmaceuticals like AstraZeneca, IPR Pharmaceuticals, QBD, and other manufacturing plants in Canóvanas.

== Culture ==
=== Festivals and events ===
Canóvanas celebrates its patron saint festival in October. The Fiestas Patronales de Nuestra Sra. del Pilar is a religious and cultural celebration that generally features parades, games, artisans, amusement rides, regional food, and live entertainment.

Other festivals and events celebrated in Canóvanas include:

- May—Holy Cross Festival
- December—Christmas in the Country

=== Sports ===
Although Canóvanas has no professional sports team currently active, several of its past teams have been notable. Traditionally, local sports teams bear the nickname of "Indios". The Indios de Canóvanas, of the Baloncesto Superior Nacional, won the championship two years in a row (1983–1984) and reached the finals in 1988. Guard Angelo Cruz and center Ramón Ramos were two of the key players of the team during that era. However, the team disappeared during the 1990s. There have been movements to reestablish the team, but they've been unsuccessful.

The Indias of Canóvanas team, from the Liga de Voleibol Superior Femenino, also won a number of championships.

Canóvanas is also the location of Hipódromo Camarero, Puerto Rico's only horse racetrack. The track, which was formerly named El Nuevo Comandante was established in 1976.

== Government ==
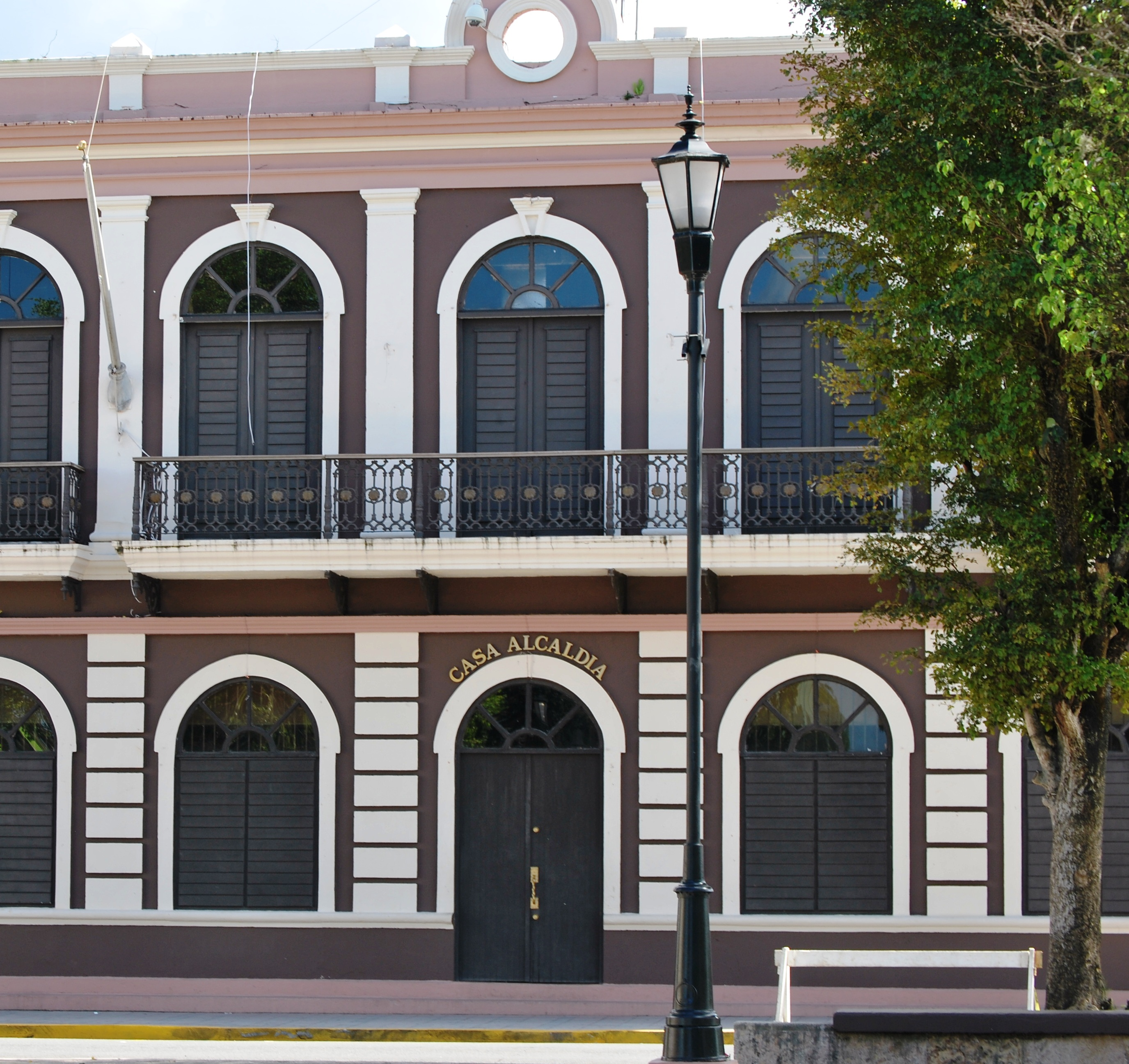
Canóvanas City Hall

All municipalities in Puerto Rico are administered by a mayor, elected every four years. The current mayor of Canóvanas is Lornna Soto, of the New Progressive Party (PNP), who was first elected in the 2012 Puerto Rican General Election. She is the daughter of long-serving former Mayor Jose "Chemo" Soto, who distinguished himself for his eccentricities in clothing, and for successfully using the urban legend of the Chupacabra to promote the city. His daughter, Lornna, also served as a member of the Senate of Puerto Rico from 2004 to 2013.

The city belongs to the Puerto Rico Senatorial district VIII, which is represented by two Senators. In 2024, Marissa Jiménez and Héctor Joaquín Sánchez Álvarez were elected as District Senators. Representatives Wanda Del Valle Correa (District 38) and Carmen Medina Calderón (District 37) represent different regions of Canóvanas in the House of Representatives.

== Symbols ==
The municipio has an official flag and coat of arms.

=== Flag ===
The flag of Canóvanas features a purple background with a wide yellow band across, and the town's coat of arms in the center.

=== Coat of arms ===
The coat of arms features a shield with the same colors (purple background and a yellow band). The colors are taken from the banner of the "Hijos y Amigos Ausentes de Canóvanas". A broken chain symbolizes the separation of Canóvanas from Loíza. The crown in the middle represents the supremacy of Cacique Canobaná. The laurels are a symbol of the 23 consecutive wins achieved by the Loíza Indians basketball team, establishing a record in Puerto Rico, also represented by the basket in the middle. The rising sun, with its sixteen rays of light, indicate the sprouting of a new municipality in Puerto Rico and the number of incumbent mayors before Canóvanas was separated from Loíza.

The coat of arms also features a white banner below with the inscription "1130 1909, Canobaná del Cayniabón, 8–16 1970". The first date, November 30, 1909, is the date of the installation of the municipal seat of Loíza in Canóvanas. The second date, August 15, 1970, is the date of the official founding of Canóvanas as a separate municipality. The names of Canobaná and Cayniabón make reference to the Taíno heritage of the region. Finally, a coronet in the form of a three-tower mural crown stands above the shield.

=== Nicknames ===
Canóvanas is known by various names. It is known as the "Pueblo Valeroso" after Cacique Yuira lost her life defending the Spanish people from her own people, the Taínos. It is also known as the "City of Indians" because of its important Taíno heritage. Canóvanas is also known as the "City of Races", because of the Hipódromo Camarero, and the "Town of the Chupacabras" because of the alleged sightings of the creature, and the beliefs in it of former mayor, José Chemo Soto.

== Transportation ==
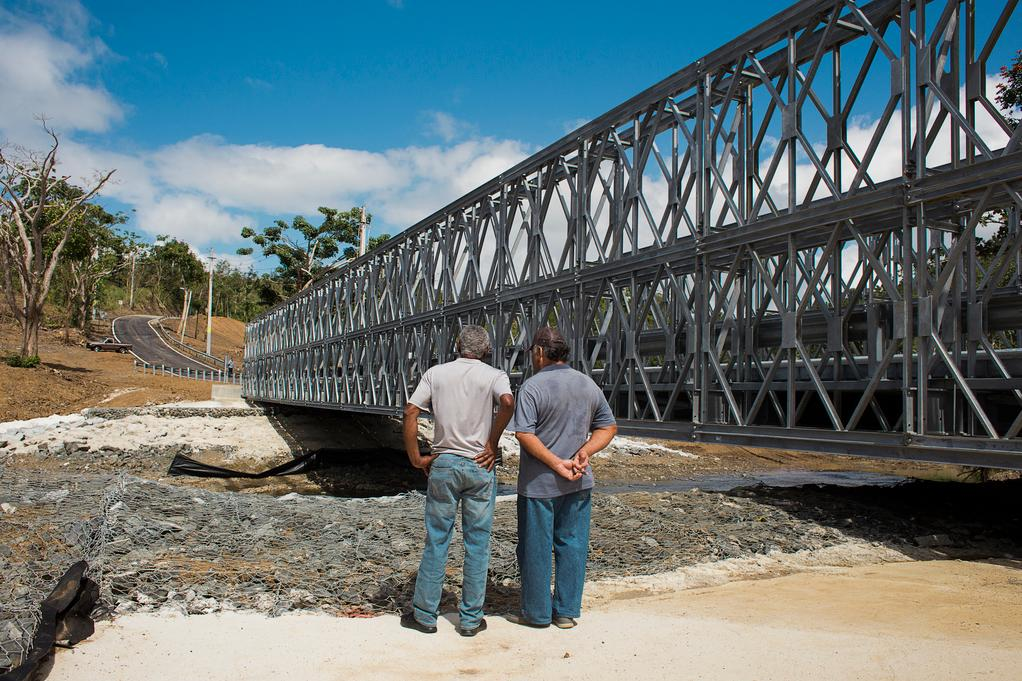
A new bridge was constructed in 2018 after the previous bridge collapsed from flooding due to Hurricane Maria.

The main road to Canóvanas is the PR-3 that crosses the municipality from east to west. Distance from the capital is roughly 15 minutes. Other roads that lead to Canóvanas are PR-185 that enters between the Lomas and Hato Puerco barrios, PR-186 of the Cubuy ward, and PR-957 of the Hato Puerco ward. Roads 874 and 188 enter the town from the north, the former at Torrecillas Alta from Carolina and the latter at Canóvanas Pueblo from Loíza. In 2012, the PR-66, which starts in Carolina, was extended to lead directly into Canóvanas.

There is also a terminal for public cars in front of the town square, as well as service provided by taxis, and independent public cars.

Canovanas is reasonably close to Luis Muñoz Marín International Airport in Carolina and to the Port of San Juan.

There are 29 bridges in Canóvanas.

== Books ==
Canóvanas, Puerto Rico The Cradle of The Indians by Greg Boudonck, Translated by Maria Ruiz O'Farrill

== See also ==
- List of Puerto Ricans
- History of Puerto Rico
