= Puerto Rico Highway 198 =

Highway in Puerto Rico

Highway 198
- Ruta 198

Route information
- Maintained by Puerto Rico DTPW
- Length: 14.8 km (9.2 mi)

Major junctions
- West end: PR-31 in Ceiba Norte
- PR-934 in Ceiba Norte–Ceiba Sur; PR-935 in Ceiba–Ceiba Norte; PR-204 in Quebrada Arenas–Montones; PR-183 in Las Piedras barrio-pueblo; PR-936 in Las Piedras barrio-pueblo; PR-926 in Las Piedras barrio-pueblo; PR-921 in Tejas–Collores; PR-914 in Mabú; PR-922 in Mabú; PR-60 in Mabú
- East end: PR-3 in Humacao barrio-pueblo

Location
- Country: United States
- Territory: Puerto Rico
- Municipalities: Juncos, Las Piedras, Humacao

Highway system
- Roads in Puerto Rico; List
| ← PR-196 | → PR-199 |
| ← PR-187R | PR-198R | → PR-200R |

Puerto Rico Highway 198 (PR-198) is a 15-kilometre-long (9 mi) highway that parallels Puerto Rico Highway 30 from Juncos, Puerto Rico, to Humacao, Puerto Rico, where it ends at Puerto Rico Highway 3. Like Puerto Rico Highway 189, it passes through the business centers of Juncos, Las Piedras and Humacao.

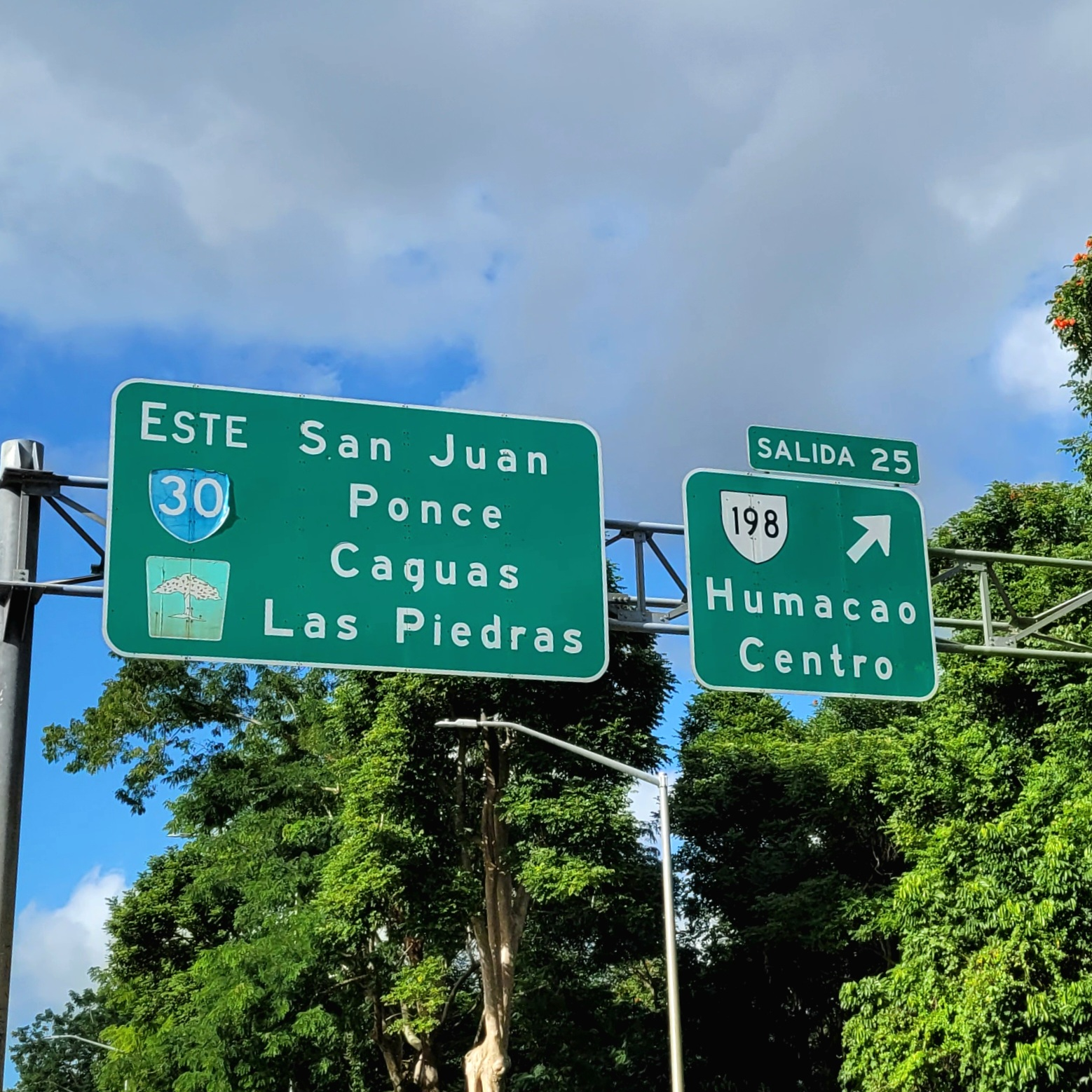
PR-30 west at exit 25 to PR-198 in Mabú, Humacao

== Major intersections ==
| Municipality | Location | km | mi | Destinations | Notes |
|---|---|---|---|---|---|
| Juncos | Ceiba Norte | 0.0 | 0.0 | PR-31 – Juncos, Naguabo | Western terminus of PR-198 |
| Juncos | Ceiba Norte–Ceiba Sur line | 0.9 | 0.56 | PR-934 – Ceiba Sur | |
| Las Piedras–Juncos municipal line | Ceiba–Ceiba Norte line | 4.7 | 2.9 | PR-9935 – Ceiba Norte | |
| Las Piedras–Juncos municipal line | Ceiba–Ceiba Norte line | 5.0 | 3.1 | PR-935 – Ceiba Norte | |
| Las Piedras | Quebrada Arenas–Ceiba line | 5.2 | 3.2 | PR-9937 – Ceiba | |
| Las Piedras | Quebrada Arenas–Montones line | 6.2 | 3.9 | PR-204 south (Carretera Guillermo Pedraza Algarín) – Las Piedras | |
| Las Piedras | Quebrada Arenas–Montones line | 7.4 | 4.6 | PR-9939 (Desvío Francisco Maldonado) – Las Piedras | |
| Las Piedras | Las Piedras barrio-pueblo | 7.9 | 4.9 | PR-183 west (Avenida Gobernador Jesús T. Piñero) – San Lorenzo | |
| Las Piedras | Las Piedras barrio-pueblo | 7.9– 8.0 | 4.9– 5.0 | PR-936 (Calle Ernesto Ramos Antonini) – Boquerón | |
| Las Piedras | Las Piedras barrio-pueblo | 8.5 | 5.3 | PR-926 (Calle Leopoldo Figueroa) – Collores | |
| Las Piedras | Tejas–Collores line | 9.1 | 5.7 | PR-921 – Tejas | |
| Humacao | Mabú | 12.2 | 7.6 | PR-914 – Tejas | |
| Humacao | Mabú | 12.7 | 7.9 | PR-922 – Mabú | |
| Humacao | Mabú | 13.3 | 8.3 | PR-60 (Expreso Dionisio Casillas) – Caguas, Ceiba | Partial cloverleaf interchange |
| Humacao | Humacao barrio-pueblo | 14.6– 14.7 | 9.1– 9.1 | To PR-924 (Calle Dufresne) / PR-Avenida Cruz Ortiz Stella – Collores | One-way street |
| Humacao | Humacao barrio-pueblo | 14.8 | 9.2 | PR-3 – Yabucoa, Ceiba | Eastern terminus of PR-198 |
1.000 mi = 1.609 km; 1.000 km = 0.621 mi

== Related route ==
Highway 198R
- Location: Humacao
- Length: 0.8 km (0.50 mi; 2,600 ft)

Puerto Rico Highway 198R (Spanish: Carretera Ramal 198, abbreviated Ramal PR-198 or PR-198R) is a one-way street that serves as a parallel route of PR-198 in downtown Humacao. This road extends from PR-198 near PR-3 to PR-198 heading west. The entire route is located in Humacao barrio-pueblo, Humacao.

| km | mi | Destinations | Notes |
|---|---|---|---|
| 0.8 | 0.50 | PR-198 (Calle Font Martelo) – Las Piedras | Western terminus of PR-198R |
| 0.3– 0.2 | 0.19– 0.12 | PR-198 east (Calle Font Martelo) – Humacao | One-way street |
| 0.0 | 0.0 | PR-198 (Avenida Cruz Ortiz Stella) – Humacao | Eastern terminus of PR-198R |
1.000 mi = 1.609 km; 1.000 km = 0.621 mi
