= Puerto Rico Highway 204 =

Highway in Puerto Rico

Highway 204
- Ruta 204
- Carretera Guillermo Pedraza Algarín

Route information
- Maintained by Puerto Rico DTPW
- Length: 2.2 km (1.4 mi)

Major junctions
- South end: PR-183 in Montones
- PR-30 in Montones–Ceiba
- North end: PR-198 in Montones–Quebrada Arenas

Location
- Country: United States
- Territory: Puerto Rico
- Municipalities: Las Piedras

Highway system
- Roads in Puerto Rico; List
← PR-203	→ PR-205

Puerto Rico Highway 204 (PR-204) was previously a short connector road between PR-22 and PR-2 in Barceloneta, Puerto Rico but was renumbered Puerto Rico Highway 140, and a new PR-204 was built in Las Piedras, Puerto Rico, which connects PR-30 and PR-198 to PR-183 in the municipality. The new connector was constructed to better serve residents of the town which can only enter through the exit to PR-183 and has a high frequency of long congestion and traffic jams. The main movie theater in the east coast can be accessed by the road.

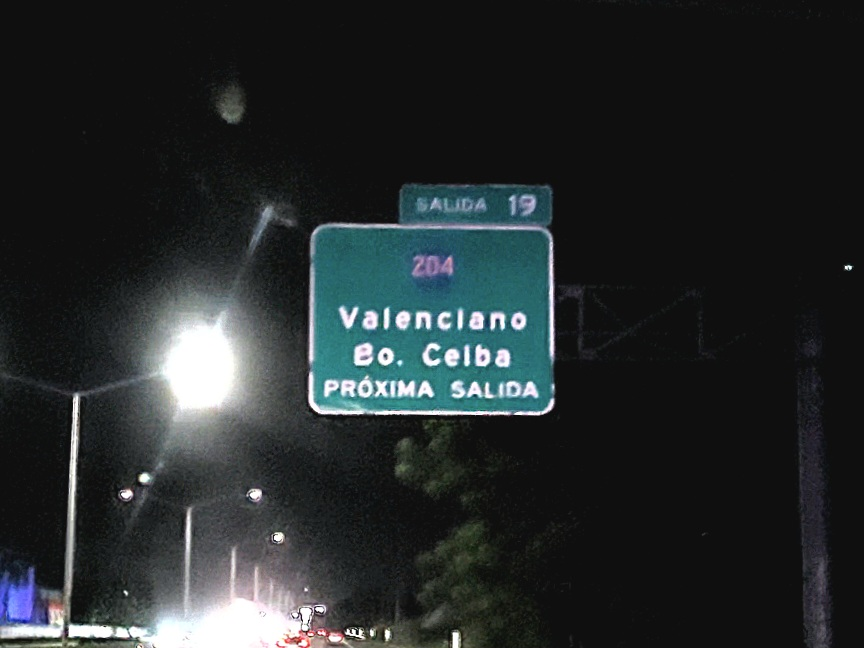
PR-30 west approaching PR-204 in Montones barrio

== Major intersections ==
The entire route is located in Las Piedras.

Location	km	mi	Destinations	Notes
Montones	0.0	0.0	PR-183 – Las Piedras, San Lorenzo	Southern terminus of PR-204
Montones–Ceiba line	1.2– 1.3	0.75– 0.81	PR-30 (Expreso Cruz Ortiz Stella) – Caguas, Humacao	PR-30 exit 19; diamond interchange
Montones–Quebrada Arenas line	2.2	1.4	PR-198 – Juncos, Las Piedras	Northern terminus of PR-204
1.000 mi = 1.609 km; 1.000 km = 0.621 mi
