= Itzamar Peña Ramírez =

Senator of Puerto Rico

Member of the Puerto Rico Senate from the at-large district
- In office January 2, 2009 – January 2, 2021

Mayor of Las Piedras
- In office 2005–2009
- Preceded by: Angel Peña Rosa
- Succeeded by: Miguel López Rivera

Personal details
- Born: February 10, 1974 (age 52) Humacao, Puerto Rico
- Party: New Progressive Party
- Education: University of Puerto Rico at Humacao (BSS); University of Puerto Rico School of Law (JD)
- Profession: Politician, Attorney

Itzamar Peña Ramírez (born February 10, 1974, in Humacao, Puerto Rico) is a Puerto Rican PNP politician. She served as a member of the Senate of Puerto Rico from 2009 until losing her seat in the 2020 general elections. She was also Mayor of Las Piedras from 2005 to 2009.

== Early years and studies ==
Itzamar Peña was born on February 10, 1974, in Humacao, Puerto Rico to Angel Peña Rosa and Rosalia Ramírez. Her father was Mayor of Las Piedras from 1989 until she succeeded him in 2004.

Peña obtained her bachelor's degree in Social Work from the University of Puerto Rico at Humacao, and her Juris Doctor from the University of Puerto Rico School of Law in Río Piedras.

== Political career ==
=== Mayor of Las Piedras: 2005–2009 ===
In 2004, she started her campaign for Mayor of Las Piedras. She won the party primaries in 2003 with 54.7% of the votes. The next year, she won the general elections becoming the only female Mayor elected in 2004.

=== Senator: 2009–2021 ===
In 2008, Peña won a slot for Senator at the PNP primaries and eventually was elected at the general elections. She has presided the Commissions of Municipal Affairs and Civil Jury. She was vice-president of the Commissions of Public Safety and Judicial Affairs, as well as other positions.

== Other appointments ==
On January 13, 2026 Itzamar Peña Ramírez was appointed Family Affairs Attorney by governor Jenniffer González.
