= Ceiba Norte =

Barrio of Juncos, Puerto Rico

- Barrio
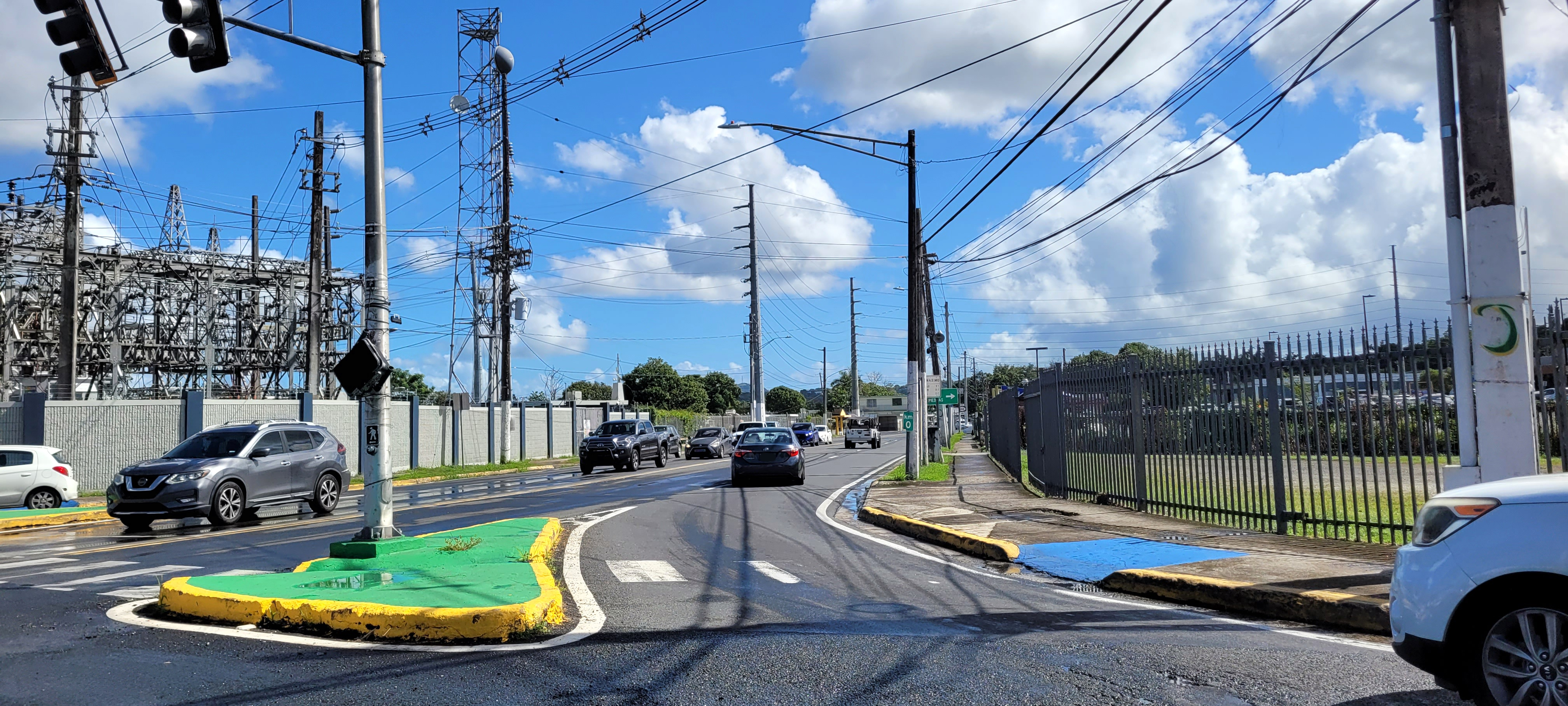
- Puerto Rico Highway 198 in Ceiba Norte

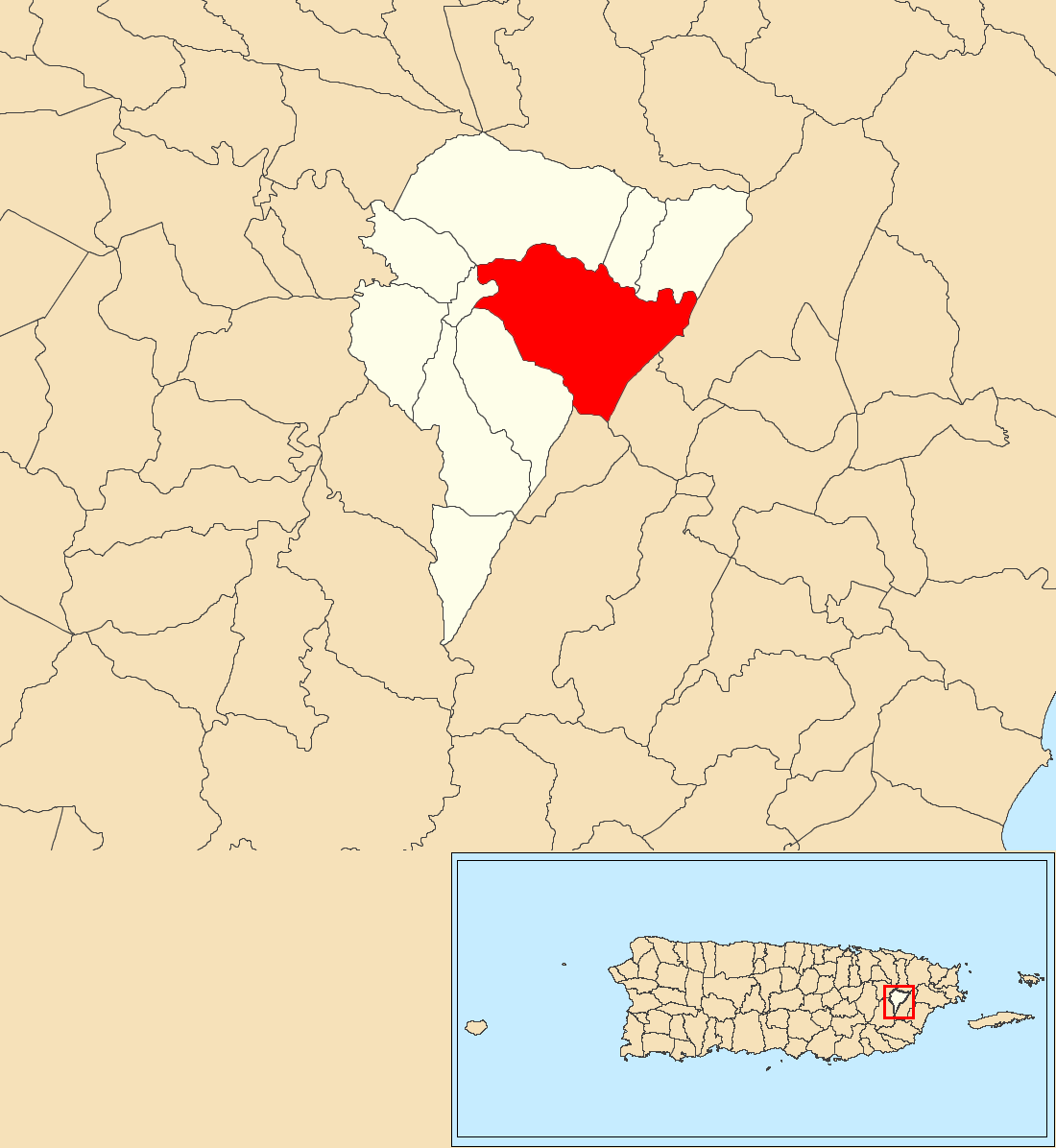
- Location of Ceiba Norte within the municipality of Juncos shown in red

- Location of Puerto Rico
- Coordinates: 18°13′24″N 65°53′37″W
- Commonwealth: Puerto Rico
- Municipality: Juncos

Area
  - Total: 5.49 sq mi (14.2 km^{2})
  - Land: 5.47 sq mi (14.2 km^{2})
  - Water: 0.02 sq mi (0.052 km^{2})
- Elevation: 269 ft (82 m)

Population (2010)
  - Total: 9,755
  - Density: 1,783.4/sq mi (688.6/km^{2})
- Source: 2010 Census
- Time zone: UTC−4 (AST)

Ceiba Norte is a barrio in the municipality of Juncos, Puerto Rico. Its population in 2010 was 9,755.

== History ==
Ceiba Norte was in Spain's gazetteers until Puerto Rico was ceded by Spain in the aftermath of the Spanish–American War under the terms of the Treaty of Paris of 1898 and became an unincorporated territory of the United States. In 1899, the United States Department of War conducted a census of Puerto Rico finding that the combined population of Ceiba Norte and Ceiba Sur barrios was 1,408.

Historical population
Census	Pop.	Note	%±
1910	978		—
1920	878		−10.2%
1930	1,015		15.6%
1940	1,086		7.0%
1950	1,649		51.8%
1960	1,599		−3.0%
1970	0		−100.0%
1980	3,767		—
1990	6,194		64.4%
2000	8,001		29.2%
2010	9,755		21.9%
U.S. Decennial Census; 1900 (N/A) 1910-1930; 1930-1950 1980-2000 2010

== See also ==
- List of communities in Puerto Rico
