= Quebrada Arenas, Las Piedras, Puerto Rico =

Barrio of Puerto Rico

Quebrada Arenas
- Barrio
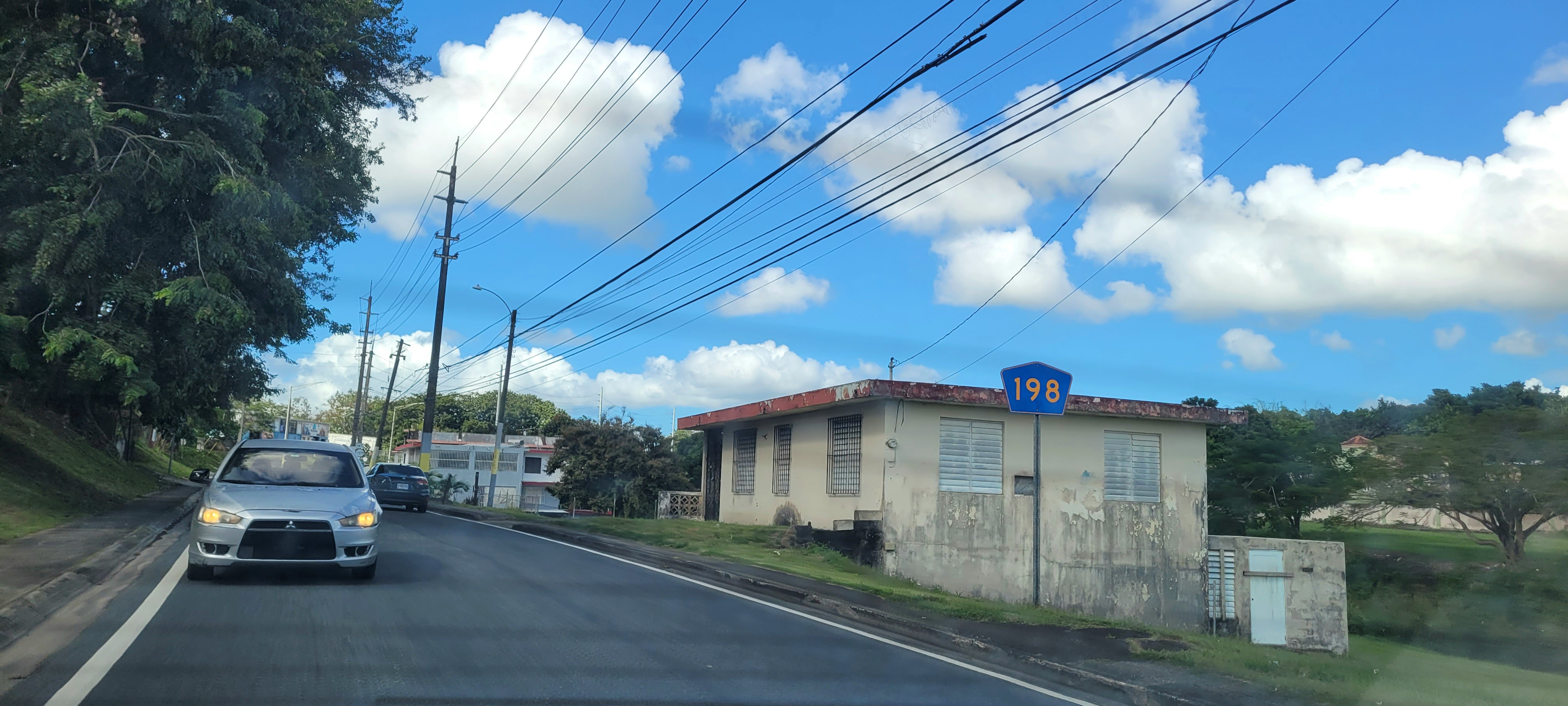
- Puerto Rico Highway 198 between Montones and Quebrada Arenas

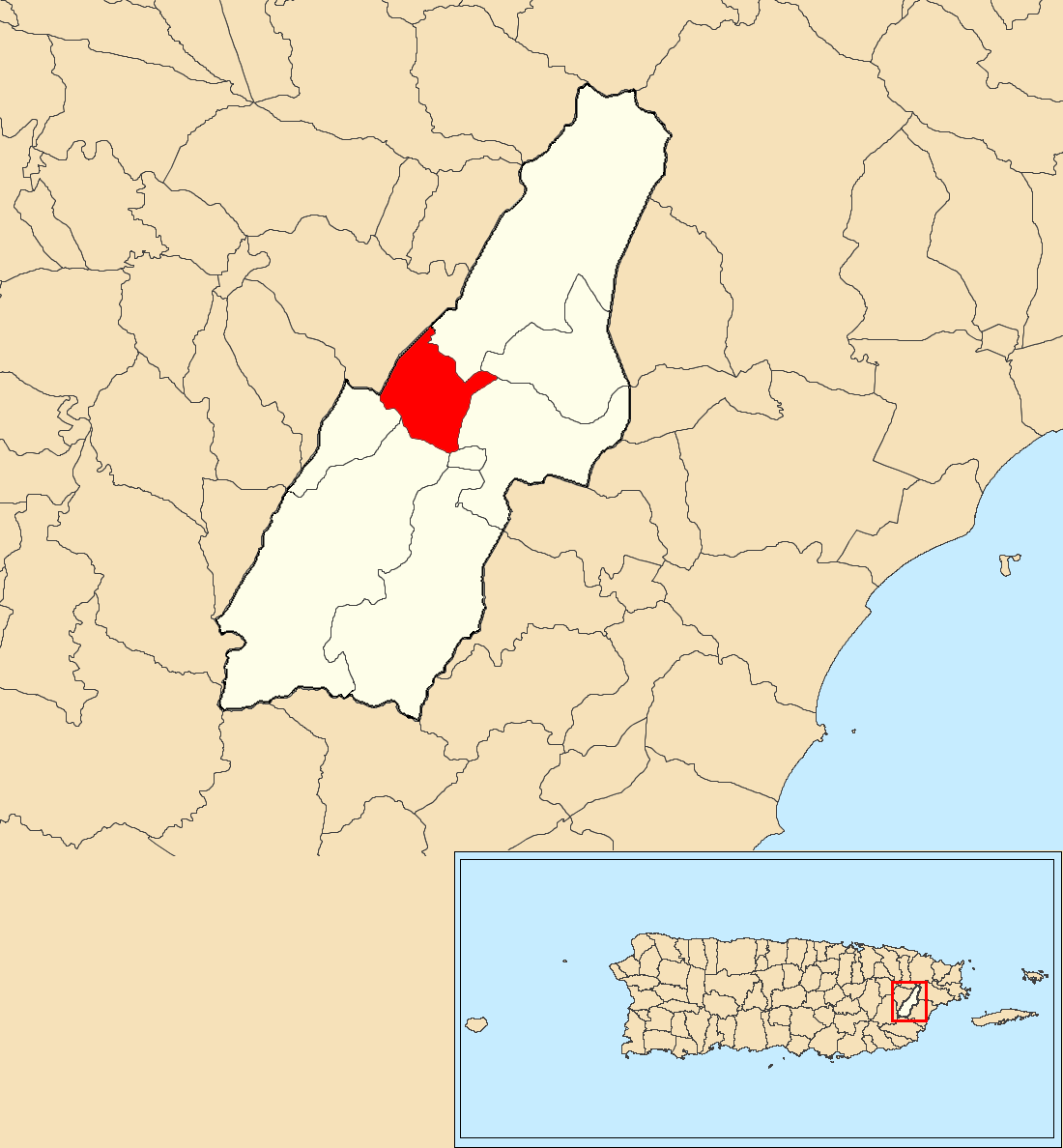
- Location of Quebrada Arenas within the municipality of Las Piedras shown in red

- Location of Puerto Rico
- Coordinates: 18°11′55″N 65°52′30″W
- Commonwealth: Puerto Rico
- Municipality: Las Piedras

Area
  - Total: 1.93 sq mi (5.0 km^{2})
  - Land: 1.93 sq mi (5.0 km^{2})
  - Water: 0 sq mi (0 km^{2})
- Elevation: 351 ft (107 m)

Population (2010)
  - Total: 4,225
  - Density: 2,200.5/sq mi (849.6/km^{2})
- Source: 2010 Census
- Time zone: UTC−4 (AST)
- ZIP Code: 00771
- Area code: 787/939

Quebrada Arenas is a barrio in the municipality of Las Piedras, Puerto Rico. Its population in 2010 was 4,225.

== History ==
Quebrada Arenas was in Spain's gazetteers until Puerto Rico was ceded by Spain in the aftermath of the Spanish–American War under the terms of the Treaty of Paris of 1898 and became an unincorporated territory of the United States. In 1899, the United States Department of War conducted a census of Puerto Rico finding that the population of Quebrada Arena barrio and Pueblo barrio was 1,449.

Historical population
Census	Pop.	Note	%±
1900	721		—
1910	404		−44.0%
1920	466		15.3%
1930	759		62.9%
1940	810		6.7%
1950	896		10.6%
1960	966		7.8%
1970	0		−100.0%
1980	1,217		—
1990	2,275		86.9%
2000	4,386		92.8%
2010	4,225		−3.7%
U.S. Decennial Census; 1899 (shown as 1900) 1910-1930; 1930-1950 1980-2000 2010

== See also ==
- List of communities in Puerto Rico
