= Cueva del Indio (Las Piedras) =

Historic place and cave in Las Piedras, Puerto Rico

- U.S. National Register of Historic Places
- Location within Puerto Rico
- Location: Las Piedras, Puerto Rico
- MPS: Prehistoric Rock Art of Puerto Rico MPS
- NRHP reference No.: 03000884
- Added to NRHP: September 4, 2003

Cueva del Indio, in Las Piedras, Puerto Rico, is a prehistoric rock art site in what is now a public park. It was listed on the National Register of Historic Places in 2003.

Artifacts at the site appear to stem from Late Ceramic Period, third phase, i.e., from A.D. 1200 to 1500.
