= Tejas, Las Piedras, Puerto Rico =

Barrio of Puerto Rico

Tejas
- Barrio
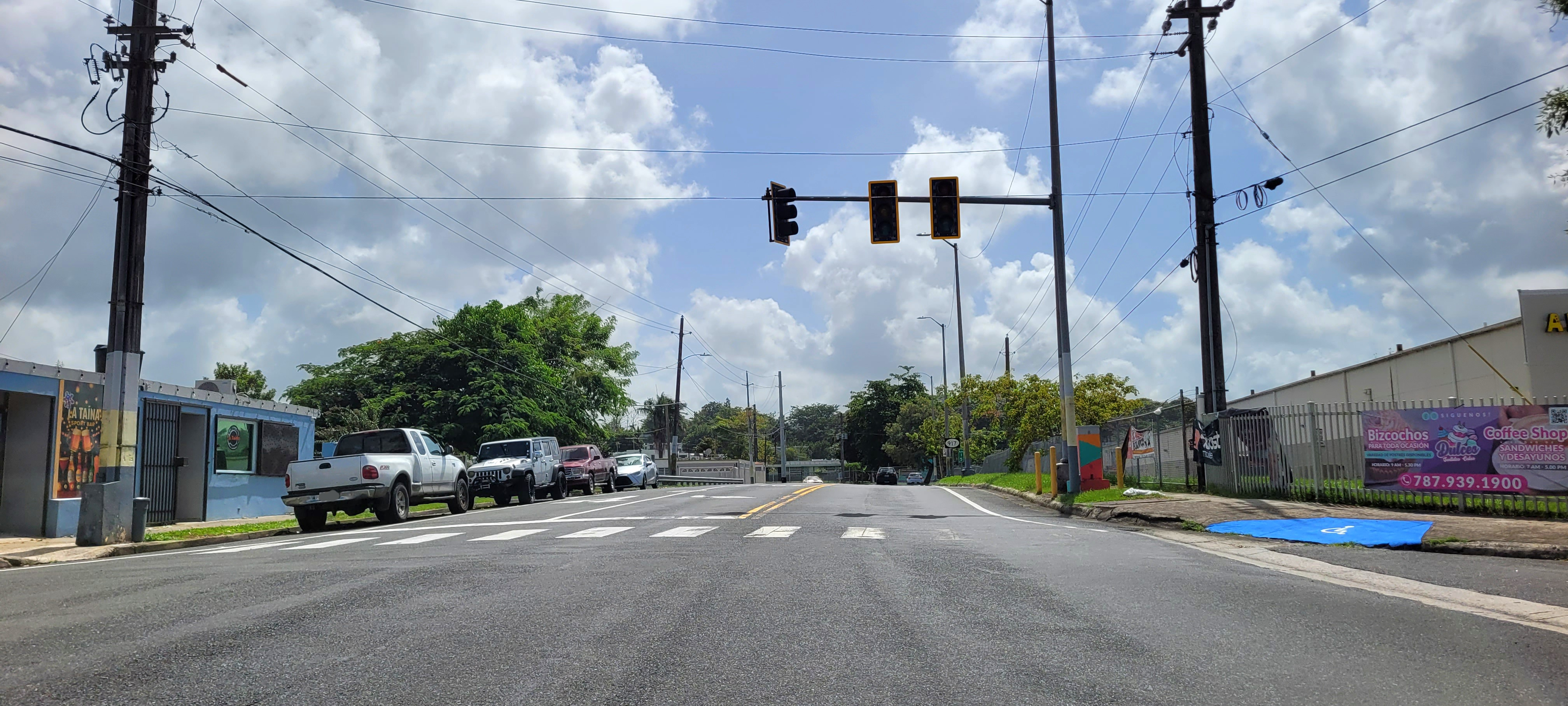
- Puerto Rico Highway 917 between Tejas and Montones

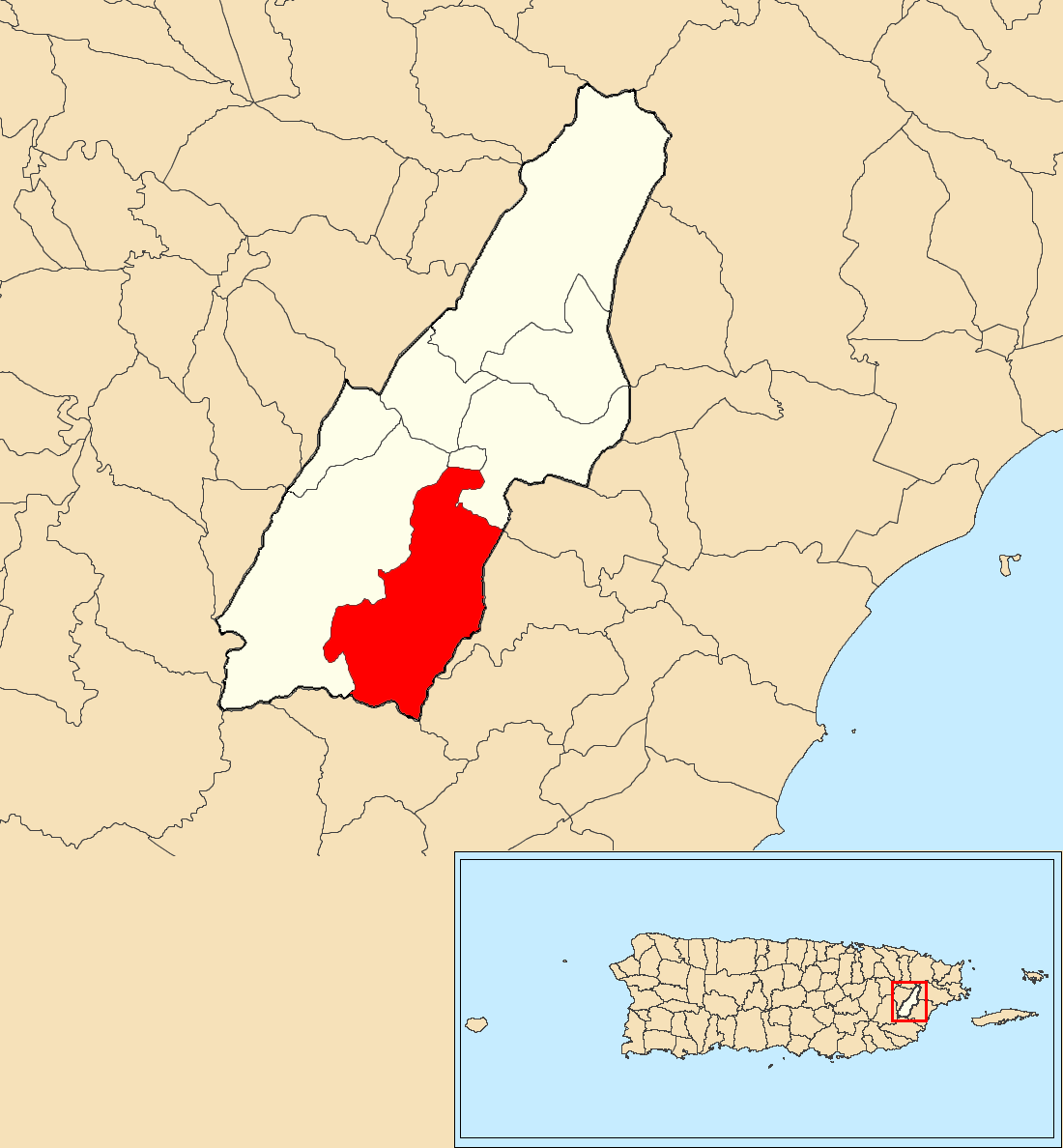
- Location of Tejas within the municipality of Las Piedras shown in red

- Location of Puerto Rico
- Coordinates: 18°09′06″N 65°52′30″W
- Commonwealth: Puerto Rico
- Municipality: Las Piedras

Area
  - Total: 6.02 sq mi (15.6 km^{2})
  - Land: 6.02 sq mi (15.6 km^{2})
  - Water: 0 sq mi (0 km^{2})
- Elevation: 653 ft (199 m)

Population (2010)
  - Total: 9,488
  - Density: 1,576.1/sq mi (608.5/km^{2})
- Source: 2010 Census
- Time zone: UTC−4 (AST)
- ZIP Code: 00771
- Area code: 787/939

Tejas is a barrio in the municipality of Las Piedras, Puerto Rico. Its population in 2010 was 9,488.

== History ==
Tejas was in Spain's gazetteers until Puerto Rico was ceded by Spain in the aftermath of the Spanish–American War under the terms of the Treaty of Paris of 1898 and became an unincorporated territory of the United States. In 1899, the United States Department of War conducted a census of Puerto Rico finding that the population of Tejas barrio was 948. At that time, the municipality was called Piedras and Tejas barrio was called Tejas Alto.

Historical population
Census	Pop.	Note	%±
1900	1,639		—
1910	2,041		24.5%
1920	2,148		5.2%
1930	2,259		5.2%
1940	2,727		20.7%
1950	2,837		4.0%
1960	2,711		−4.4%
1970	0		−100.0%
1980	5,927		—
1990	7,898		33.3%
2000	8,985		13.8%
2010	9,488		5.6%
U.S. Decennial Census; 1899 (shown as 1900) 1910-1930; 1930-1950 1980-2000 2010

== See also ==
- List of communities in Puerto Rico
