= Miguel López Rivera =

Puerto Rican politician

Mayor of Las Piedras
- Assuming office January 14, 2009
- Succeeding: Itzamar Peña

Personal details
- Born: October 14, 1963 (age 62)
- Party: New Progressive Party (PNP)
- Education: University of Puerto Rico at Humacao (BBA)

Miguel "Micky" López Rivera is a Puerto Rican politician and the current mayor of Las Piedras. López is affiliated with the New Progressive Party (PNP) and has served as mayor since 2009. Has Bachelor's degree in administration with concentration in accounting from the University of Puerto Rico at Humacao.
