= Collores, Las Piedras, Puerto Rico =

Barrio of Puerto Rico

Collores
- Barrio
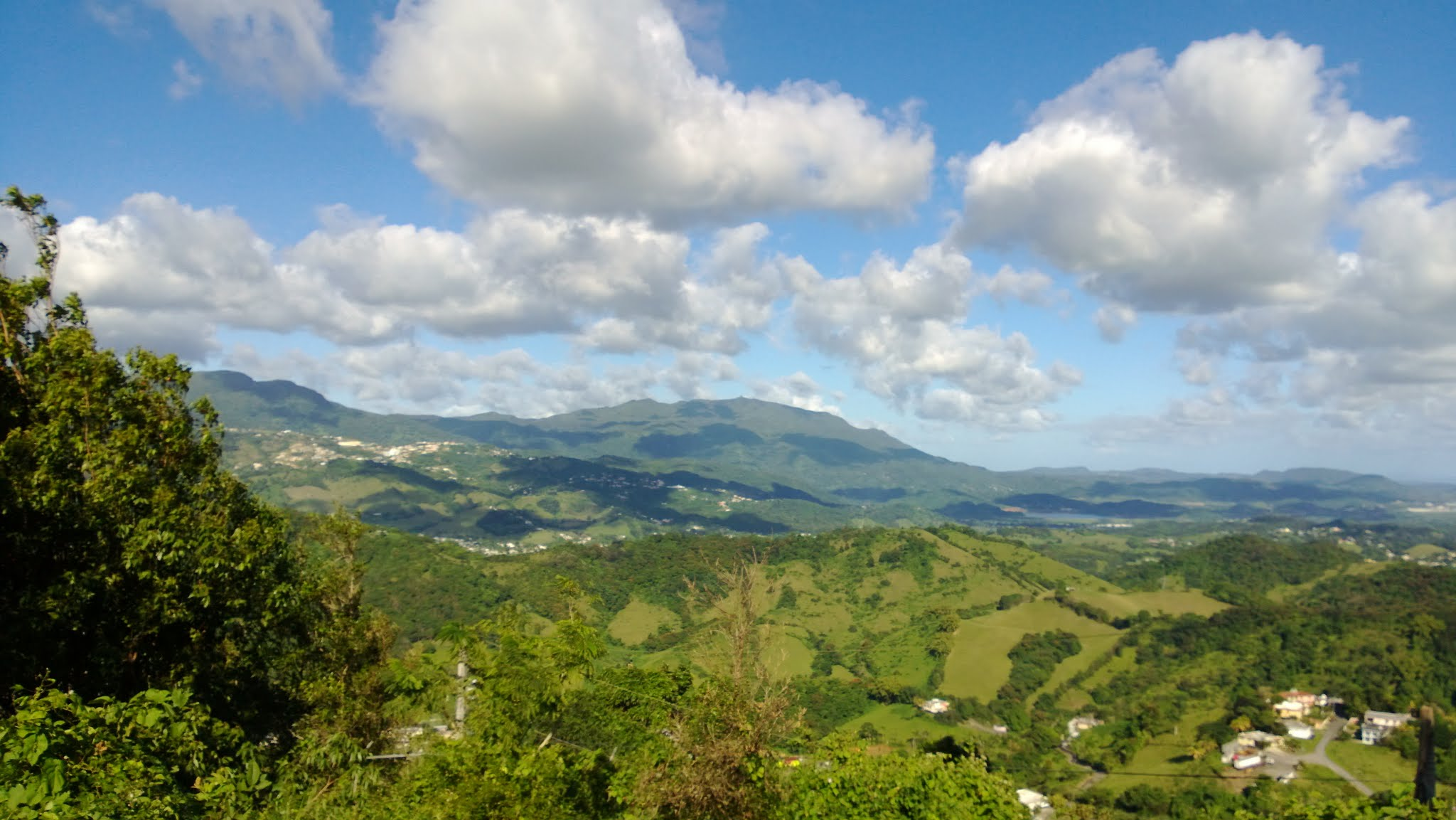
- View of Collores from the telecommunications tower nearby

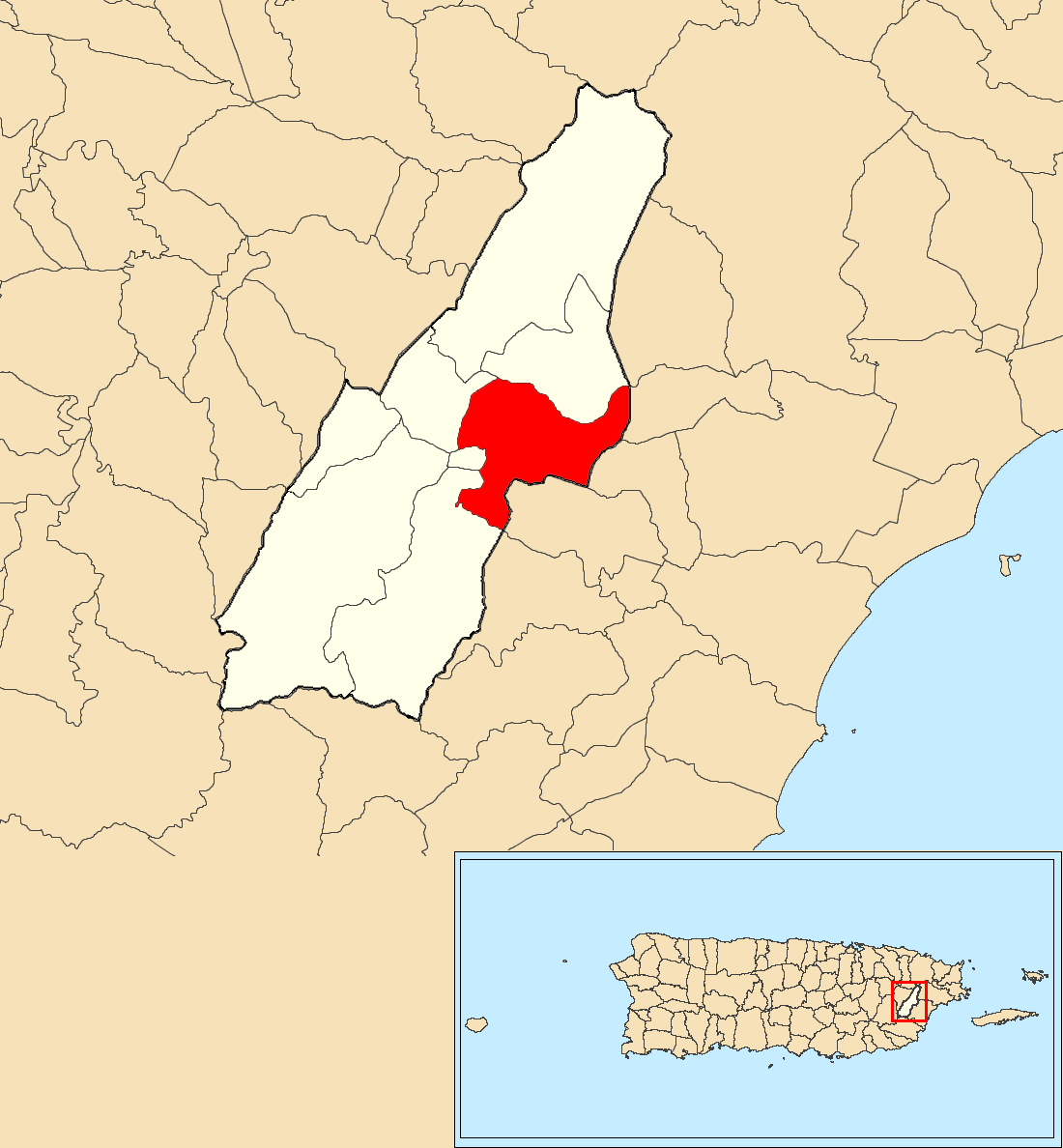
- Location of Collores within the municipality of Las Piedras shown in red

- Location of Puerto Rico
- Coordinates: 18°11′15″N 65°51′04″W
- Commonwealth: Puerto Rico
- Municipality: Las Piedras

Area
  - Total: 3.76 sq mi (9.7 km^{2})
  - Land: 3.75 sq mi (9.7 km^{2})
  - Water: 0.01 sq mi (0.026 km^{2})
- Elevation: 443 ft (135 m)

Population (2010)
  - Total: 4,710
  - Density: 1,256/sq mi (485/km^{2})
- Source: 2010 Census
- Time zone: UTC−4 (AST)
- ZIP Code: 00771
- Area code: 787/939

Collores is a barrio in the municipality of Las Piedras, Puerto Rico. Its population in 2010 was 4,710.

== History ==
Collores was in Spain's gazetteers until Puerto Rico was ceded by Spain in the aftermath of the Spanish–American War under the terms of the Treaty of Paris of 1898 and became an unincorporated territory of the United States. In 1899, the United States Department of War conducted a census of Puerto Rico finding that the combined population of Collores barrio and Boquerón barrio was 1,528.

Historical population
Census	Pop.	Note	%±
1910	1,023		—
1920	1,232		20.4%
1930	1,330		8.0%
1940	1,606		20.8%
1950	1,621		0.9%
1960	1,913		18.0%
1970	0		−100.0%
1980	3,441		—
1990	3,878		12.7%
2000	4,648		19.9%
2010	4,710		1.3%
U.S. Decennial Census; 1900 (N/A) 1910-1930; 1930-1950 1980-2000 2010

== Gallery ==
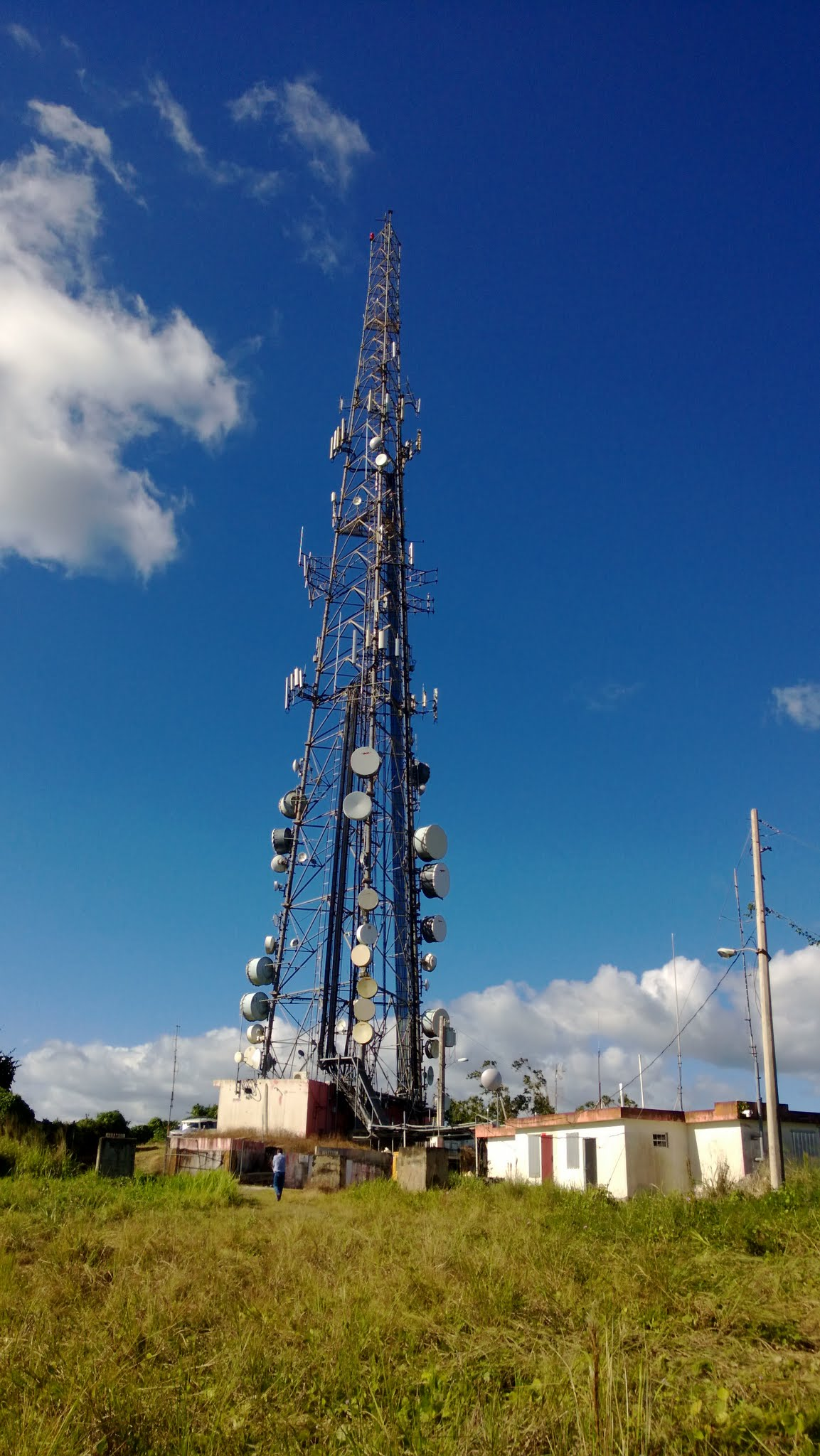
Telecommunications tower in Collores

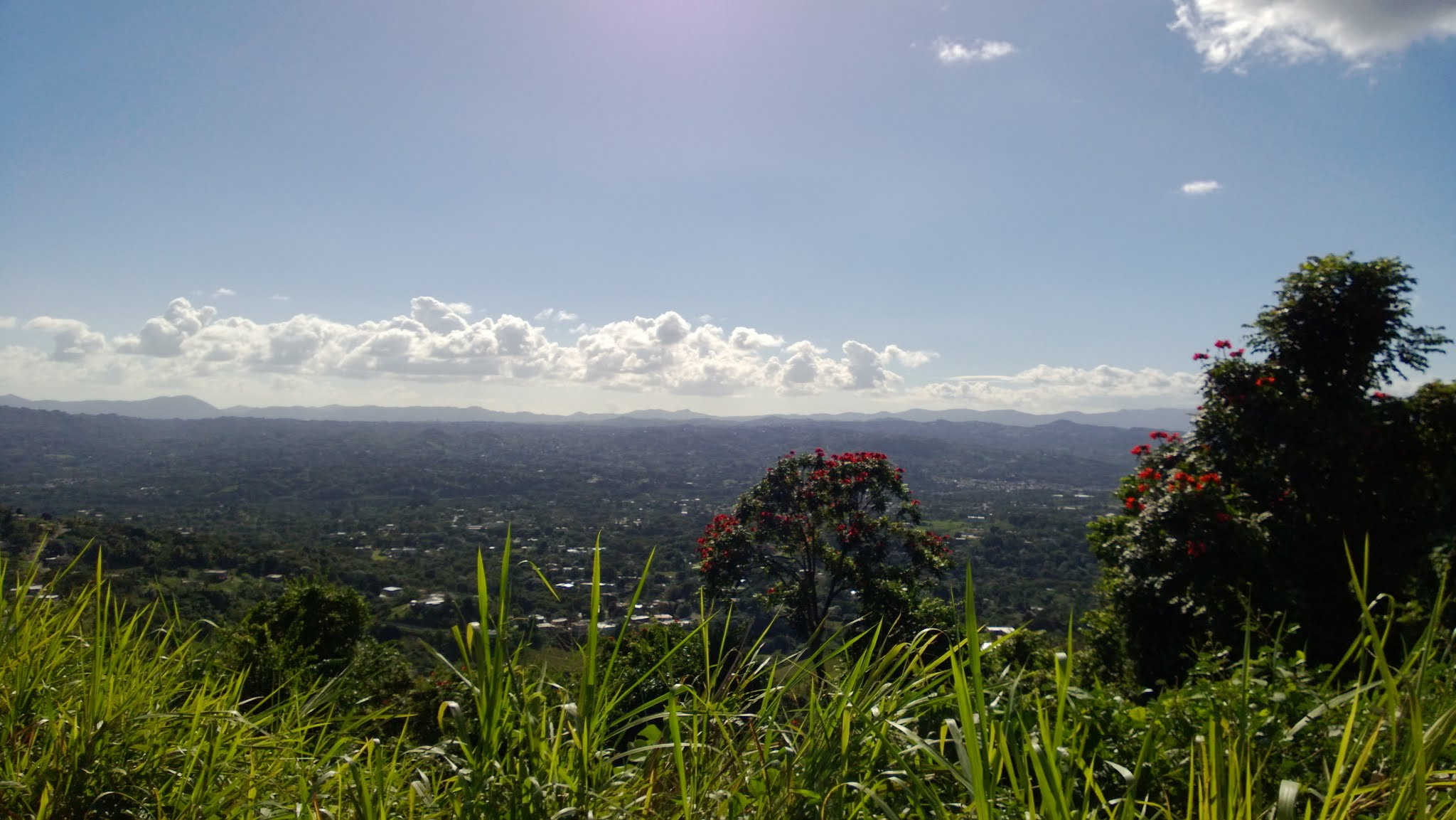
View from Collores

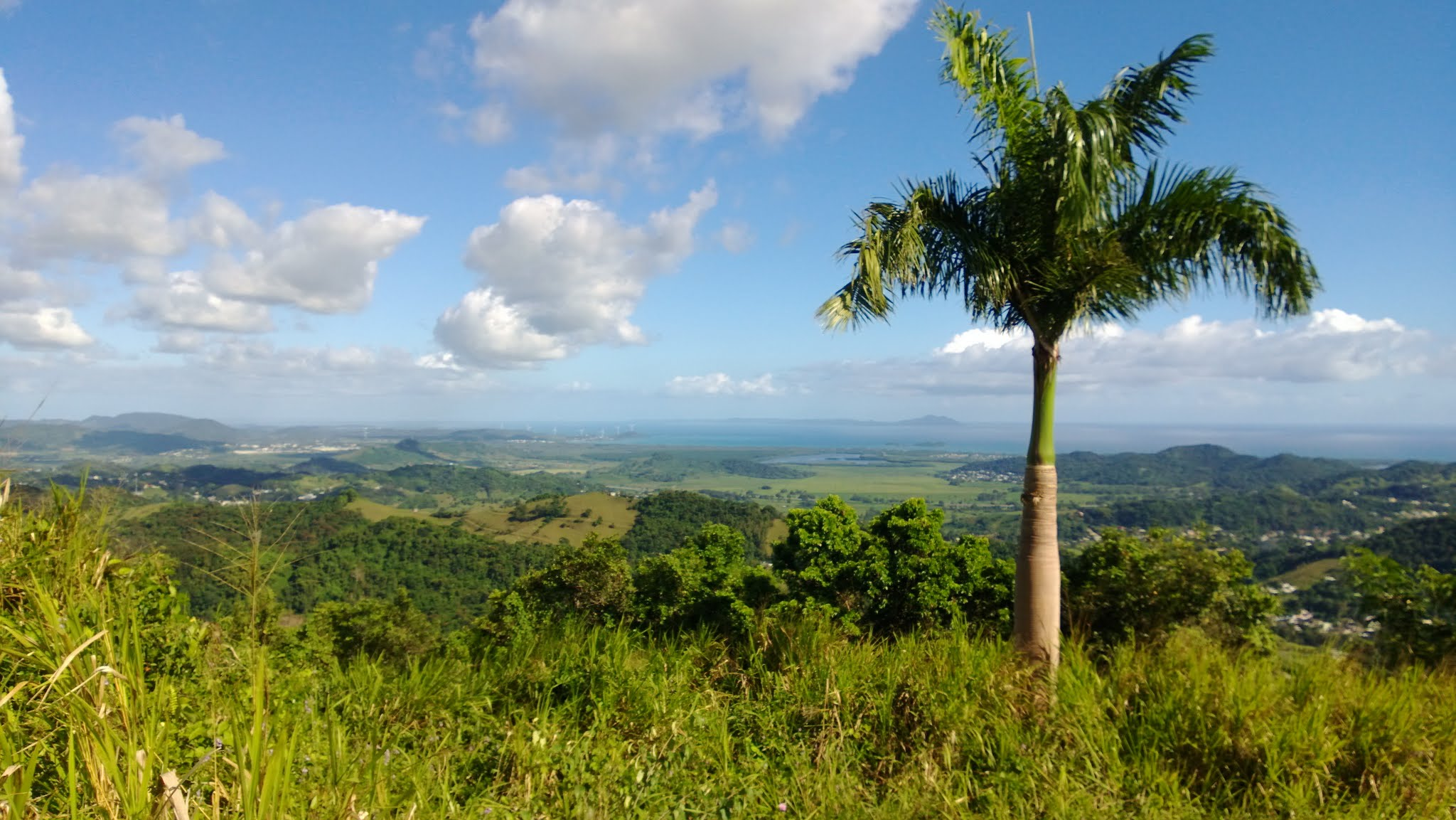
View from Collores

== See also ==
- List of communities in Puerto Rico
