= Ceiba Sur =

Barrio of Juncos, Puerto Rico

- Barrio
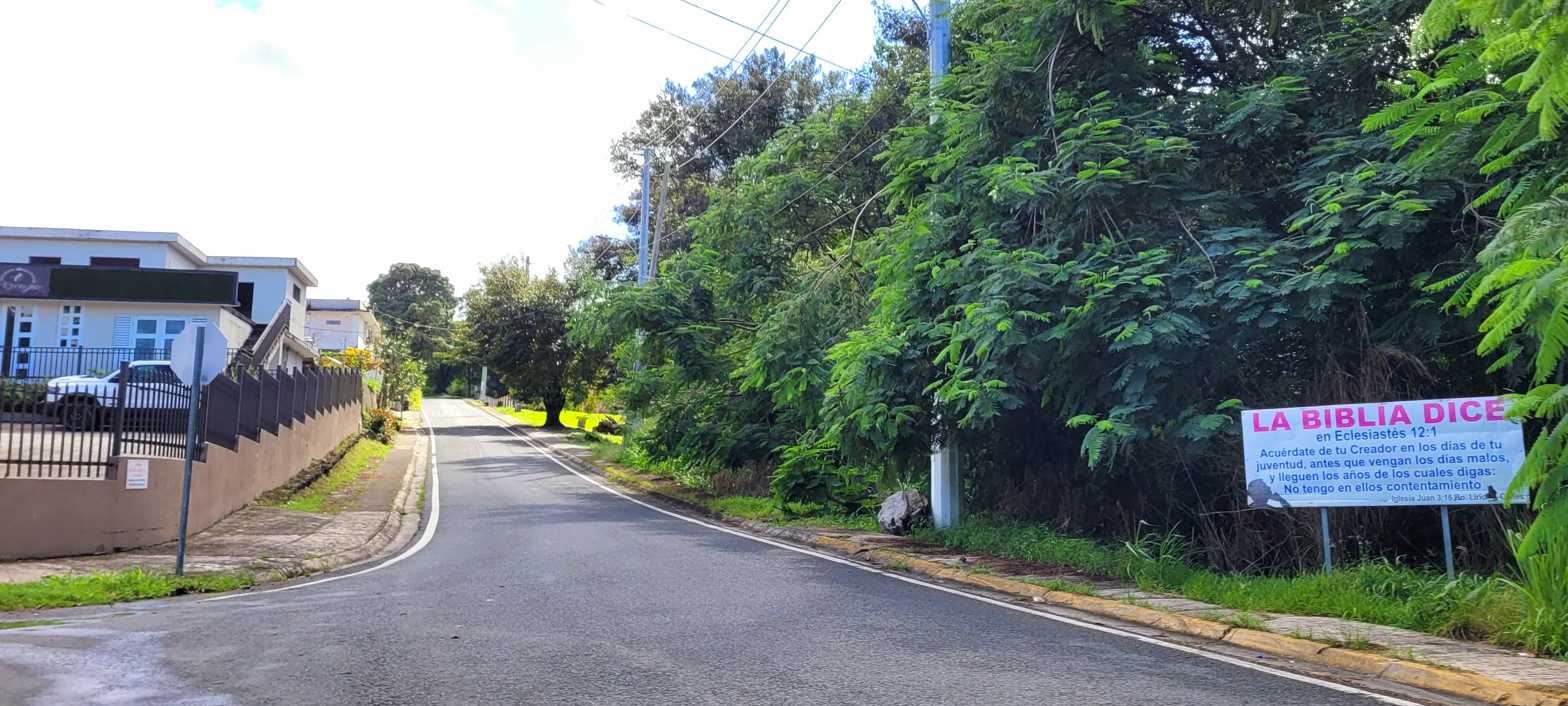
- Puerto Rico Highway 934 in Ceiba Sur

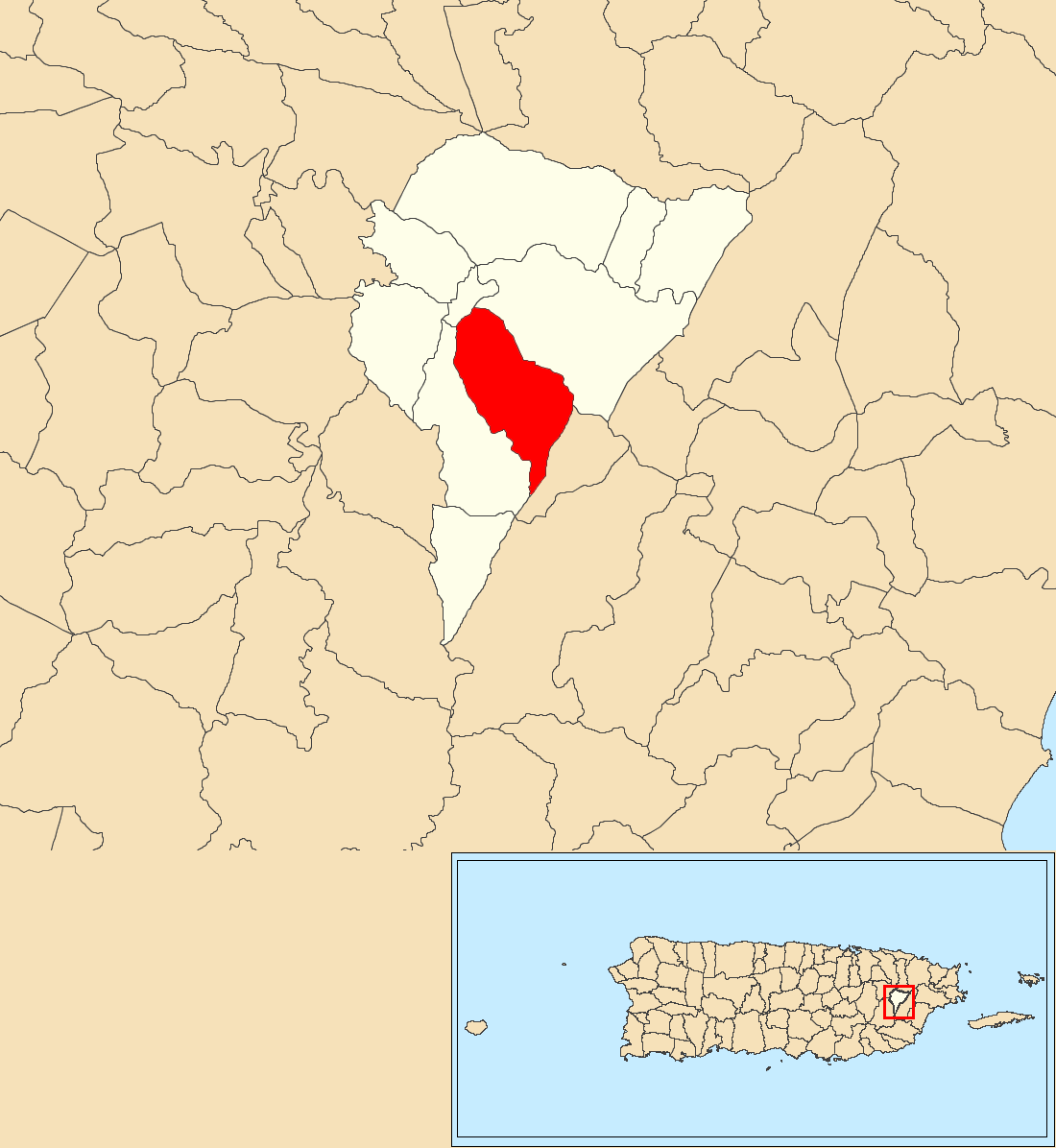
- Location of Ceiba Sur within the municipality of Juncos shown in red

- Location of Puerto Ricoo
- Coordinates: 18°11′49″N 65°54′24″W
- Commonwealth: Puerto Rico
- Municipality: Juncos

Area
  - Total: 3.00 sq mi (7.8 km^{2})
  - Land: 2.98 sq mi (7.7 km^{2})
  - Water: 0.02 sq mi (0.052 km^{2})
- Elevation: 394 ft (120 m)

Population (2010)
  - Total: 5,482
  - Density: 1,839.6/sq mi (710.3/km^{2})
- Source: 2010 Census
- Time zone: UTC−4 (AST)

Ceiba Sur is a barrio in the municipality of Juncos, Puerto Rico. Its population in 2010 was 5,482.

== History ==
Ceiba Sur was in Spain's gazetteers until Puerto Rico was ceded by Spain in the aftermath of the Spanish–American War under the terms of the Treaty of Paris of 1898 and became an unincorporated territory of the United States. In 1899, the United States Department of War conducted a census of Puerto Rico finding that the combined population of Ceiba Norte and Ceiba Sur barrios was 1,408.

Historical population
| Census | Pop. | Note | %± |
|---|---|---|---|
| 1910 | 966 | | — |
| 1920 | 1,034 | | 7.0% |
| 1930 | 1,323 | | 27.9% |
| 1940 | 1,581 | | 19.5% |
| 1950 | 1,472 | | −6.9% |
| 1960 | 2,179 | | 48.0% |
| 1970 | 0 | | −100.0% |
| 1980 | 3,402 | | — |
| 1990 | 3,502 | | 2.9% |
| 2000 | 4,600 | | 31.4% |
| 2010 | 5,482 | | 19.2% |
U.S. Decennial Census; 1900 (N/A) 1910-1930; 1930-1950 1980-2000 2010

== See also ==
- List of communities in Puerto Rico
