= Boquerón, Las Piedras, Puerto Rico =

Barrio of Puerto Rico

Boquerón
- Barrio
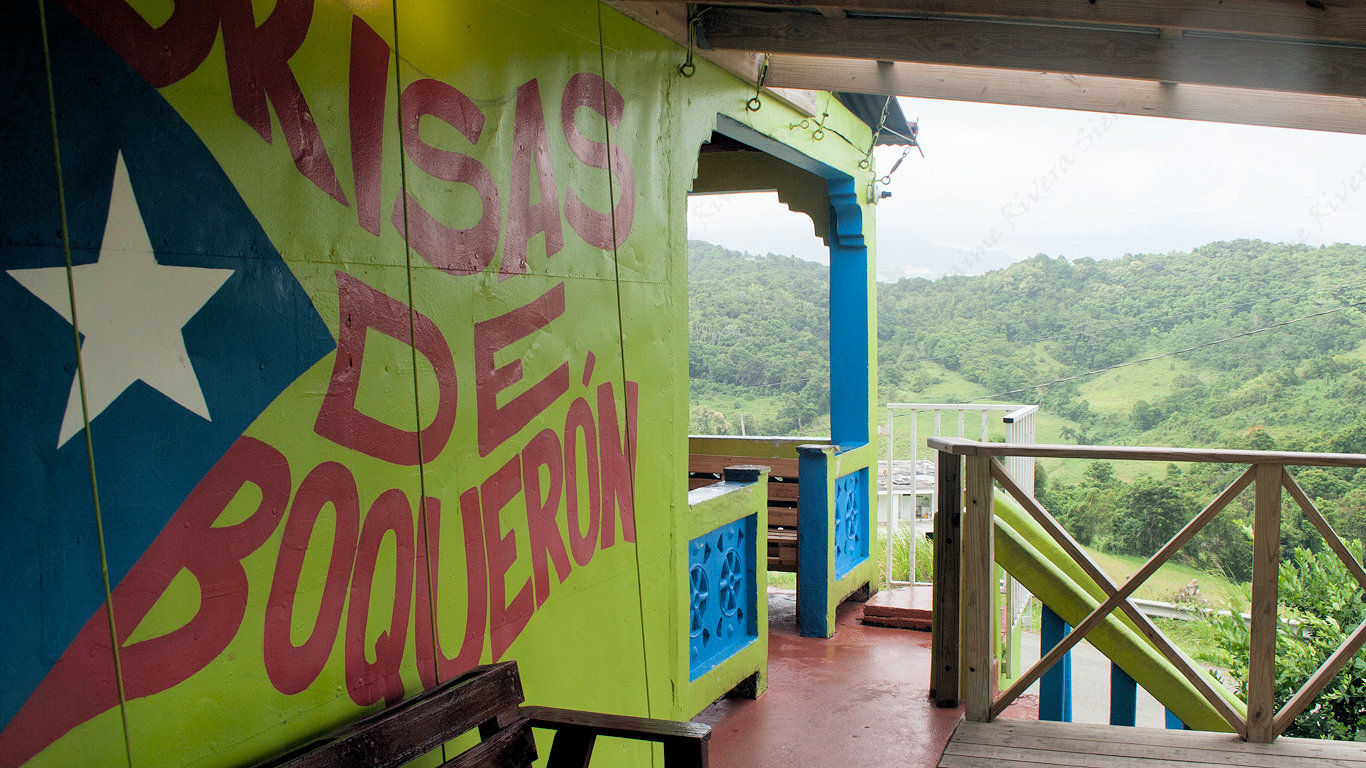
- View of mountains from Boquerón, Las Piedras

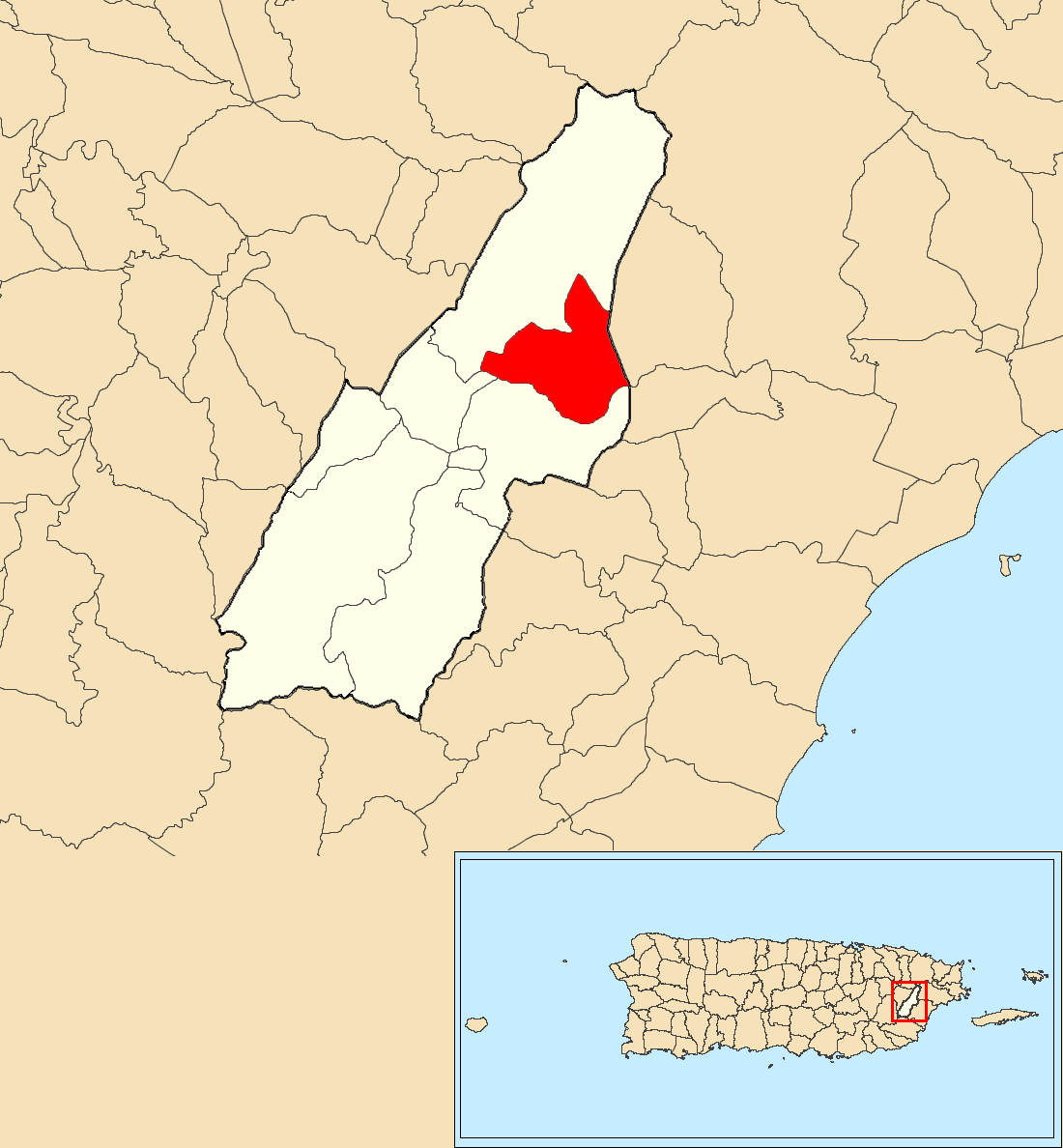
- Location of Boquerón within the municipality of Las Piedras shown in red

- Location of Puerto Rico
- Coordinates: 18°12′24″N 65°50′30″W
- Commonwealth: Puerto Rico
- Municipality: Las Piedras

Area
  - Total: 2.87 sq mi (7.4 km^{2})
  - Land: 2.87 sq mi (7.4 km^{2})
  - Water: 0 sq mi (0 km^{2})
- Elevation: 348 ft (106 m)

Population (2010)
  - Total: 1,824
  - Density: 635.5/sq mi (245.4/km^{2})
- Source: 2010 Census
- Time zone: UTC−4 (AST)
- ZIP Code: 00771
- Area code: 787/939

Boquerón is a barrio in the municipality of Las Piedras, Puerto Rico. Its population in 2010 was 1,824.

== History ==
Boquerón was in Spain's gazetteers until Puerto Rico was ceded by Spain in the aftermath of the Spanish–American War under the terms of the Treaty of Paris of 1898 and became an unincorporated territory of the United States. In 1899, the United States Department of War conducted a census of Puerto Rico finding that the combined population of Boquerón barrio and Collores barrio was 1,528.

Historical population
Census	Pop.	Note	%±
1910	984		—
1920	1,155		17.4%
1930	1,279		10.7%
1940	1,658		29.6%
1950	1,049		−36.7%
1960	1,121		6.9%
1970	1,411		25.9%
1980	1,439		2.0%
1990	1,531		6.4%
2000	1,984		29.6%
2010	1,824		−8.1%
U.S. Decennial Census; 1900 (N/A) 1910-1930; 1930-1950 1980-2000 2010

== See also ==
- List of communities in Puerto Rico
