= Humacao barrio-pueblo =

Historical and administrative center (seat) of Humacao, Puerto Rico

Humacao barrio-pueblo Pueblo de Humacao
- Municipality Seat
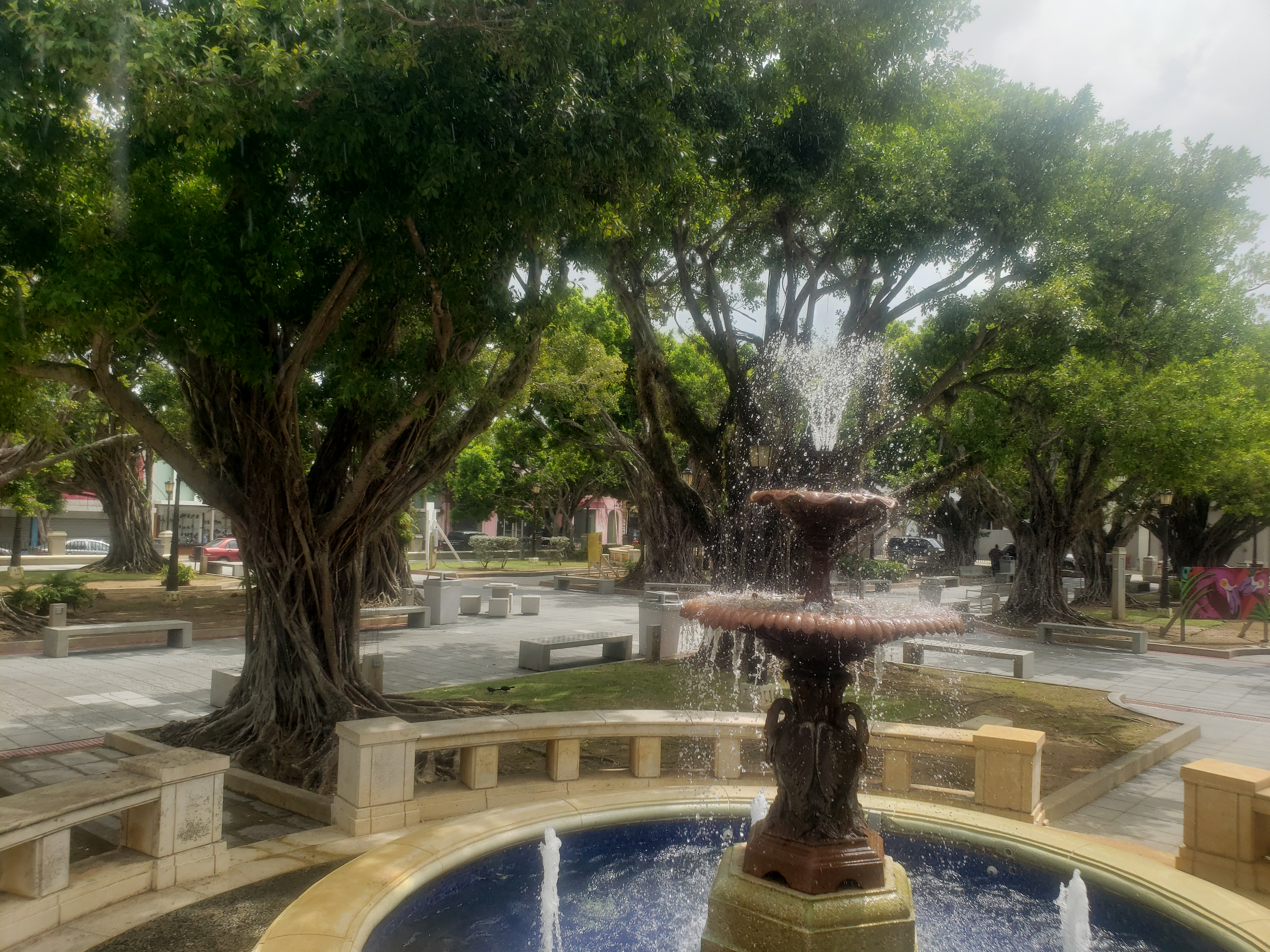
- Fountain at the main square in Humacao barrio-pueblo

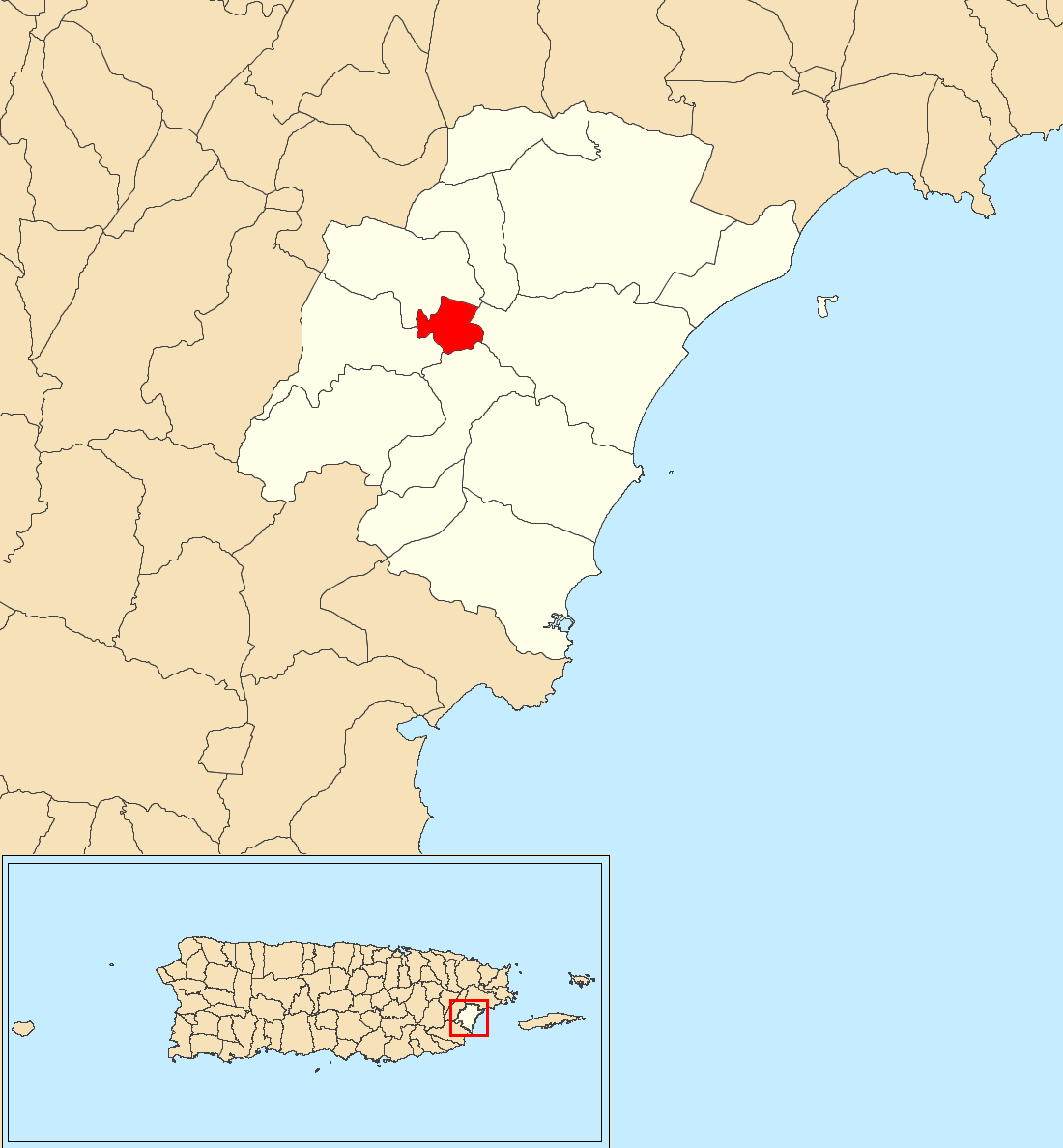
- Location of Humacao barrio-pueblo within the municipality of Humacao shown in red

- Location of Puerto Rico
- Coordinates: 18°09′07″N 65°49′28″W
- Commonwealth: Puerto Rico
- Municipality: Humacao

Area
  - Total: 0.64 sq mi (1.7 km^{2})
  - Land: 0.64 sq mi (1.7 km^{2})
  - Water: 0 sq mi (0 km^{2})
- Elevation: 66 ft (20 m)

Population (2010)
  - Total: 3,862
  - Density: 6,034.4/sq mi (2,329.9/km^{2})
- Source: 2010 Census
- Time zone: UTC−4 (AST)
- ZIP Code: 00791

Humacao barrio-pueblo is a barrio and the administrative center (seat) of Humacao, a municipality of Puerto Rico. Its population in 2010 was 3,862.

As was customary in Spain, in Puerto Rico, the municipality has a barrio called pueblo which contains a central plaza, the municipal buildings (city hall), and a Catholic church. Fiestas patronales (patron saint festivals) are held in the central plaza every year.

Historical population
Census	Pop.	Note	%±
1910	5,159		—
1920	6,183		19.8%
1930	7,937		28.4%
1940	7,624		−3.9%
1950	10,851		42.3%
1960	8,005		−26.2%
1970	0		−100.0%
1980	6,275		—
1990	5,551		−11.5%
2000	4,787		−13.8%
2010	3,862		−19.3%
U.S. Decennial Census; 1899 (shown as 1900) 1910-1930; 1930-1950 1980-2000 2010

== The central plaza and its church ==
The central plaza, or square, located on Calle Moya Hernandez, is a place for official and unofficial recreational events and a place where people can gather and socialize from dusk to dawn. The Laws of the Indies, Spanish law, which regulated life in Puerto Rico in the early 19th century, stated the plaza's purpose was for "the parties" (celebrations, festivities) (Spanish: a propósito para las fiestas), and that the square should be proportionally large enough for the number of neighbors (Spanish: grandeza proporcionada al número de vecinos). These Spanish regulations also stated that the streets nearby should be comfortable portals for passersby, protecting them from the elements: sun and rain.

Located across the central plaza in Humacao barrio-pueblo is the Concatedral Dulce Nombre de Jesús, a Roman Catholic church.

== Gallery ==
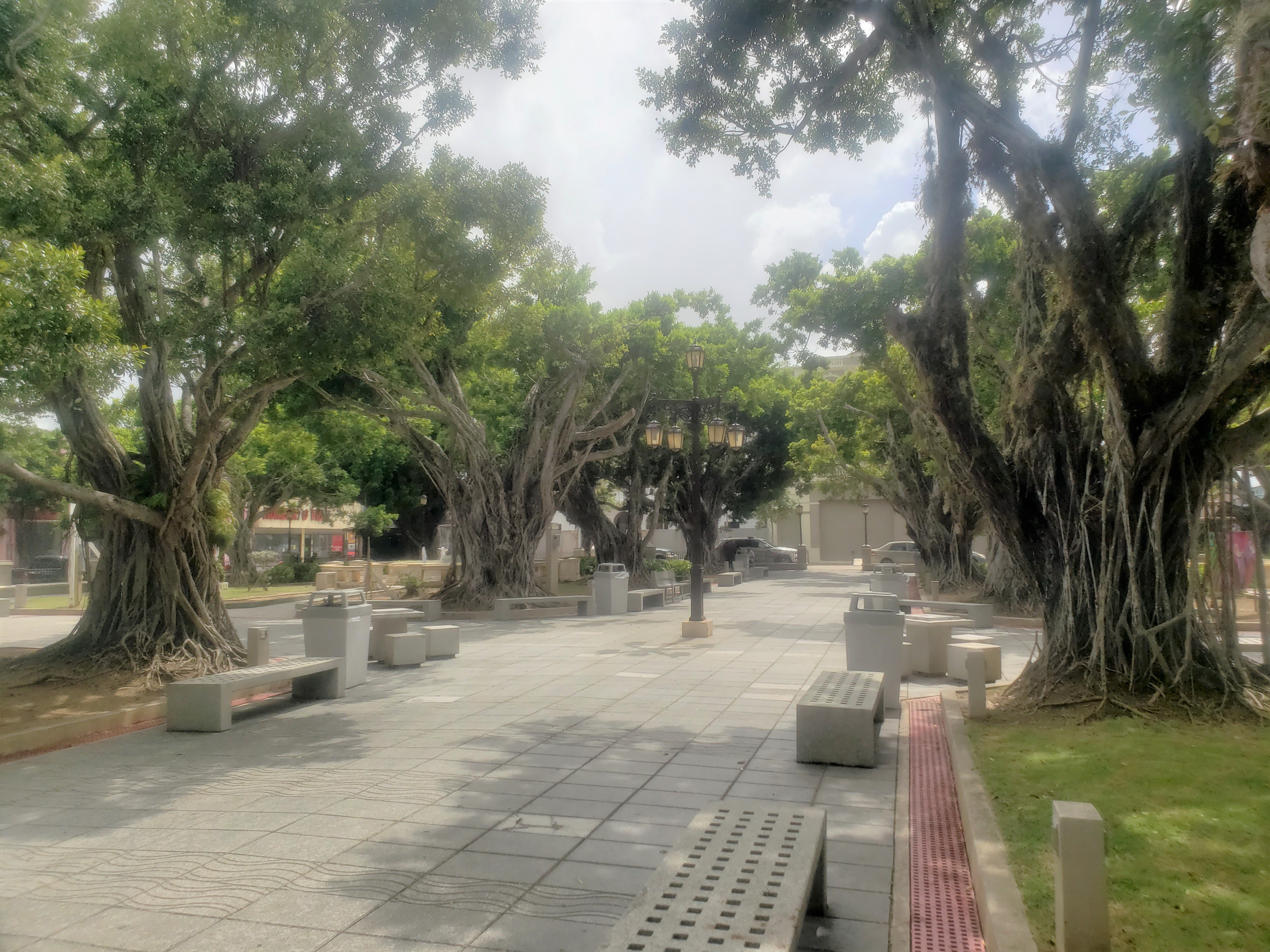
Central plaza

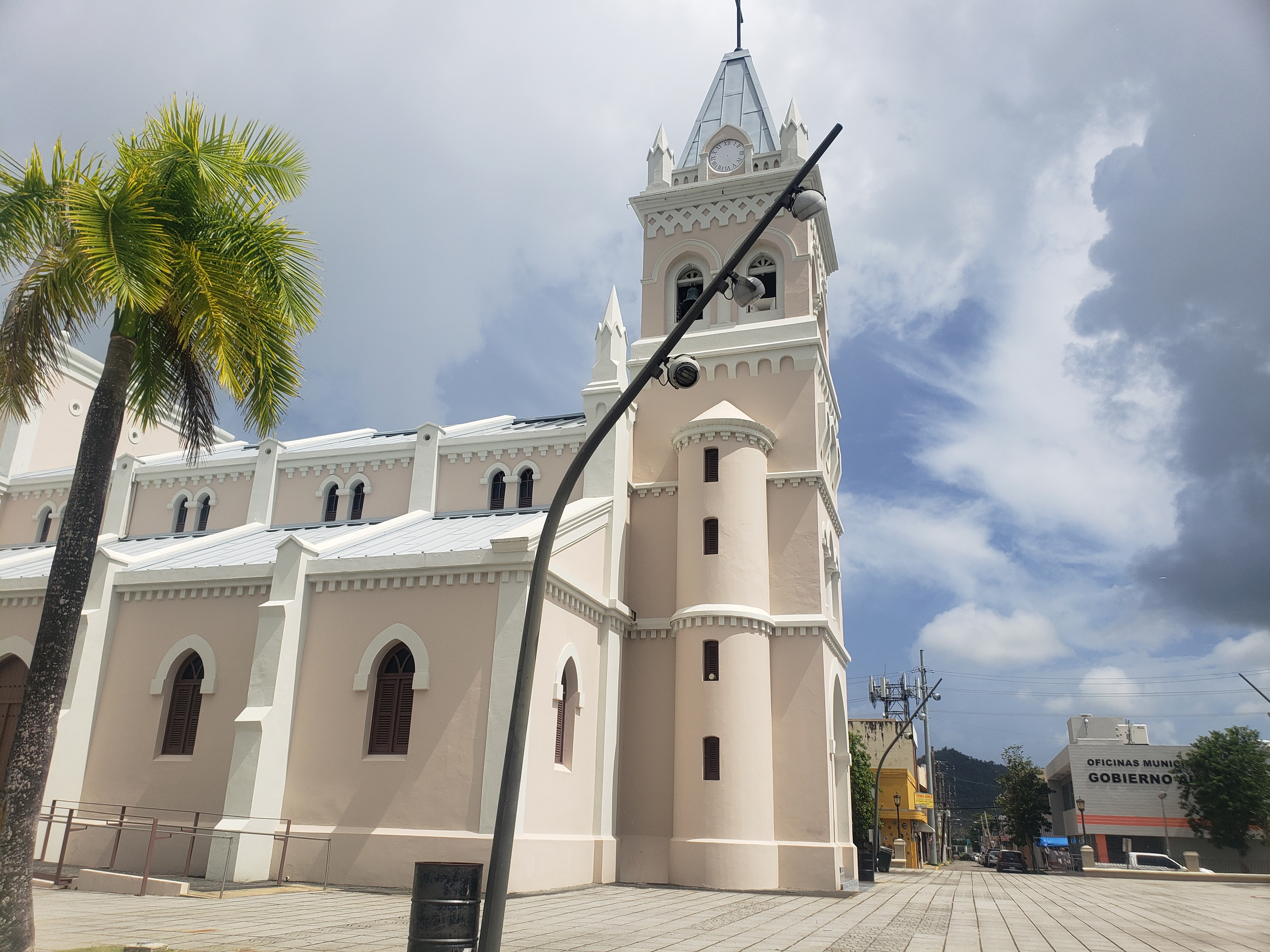
Dulce Nombre de Jesús Cathedral of Humacao in 2020.

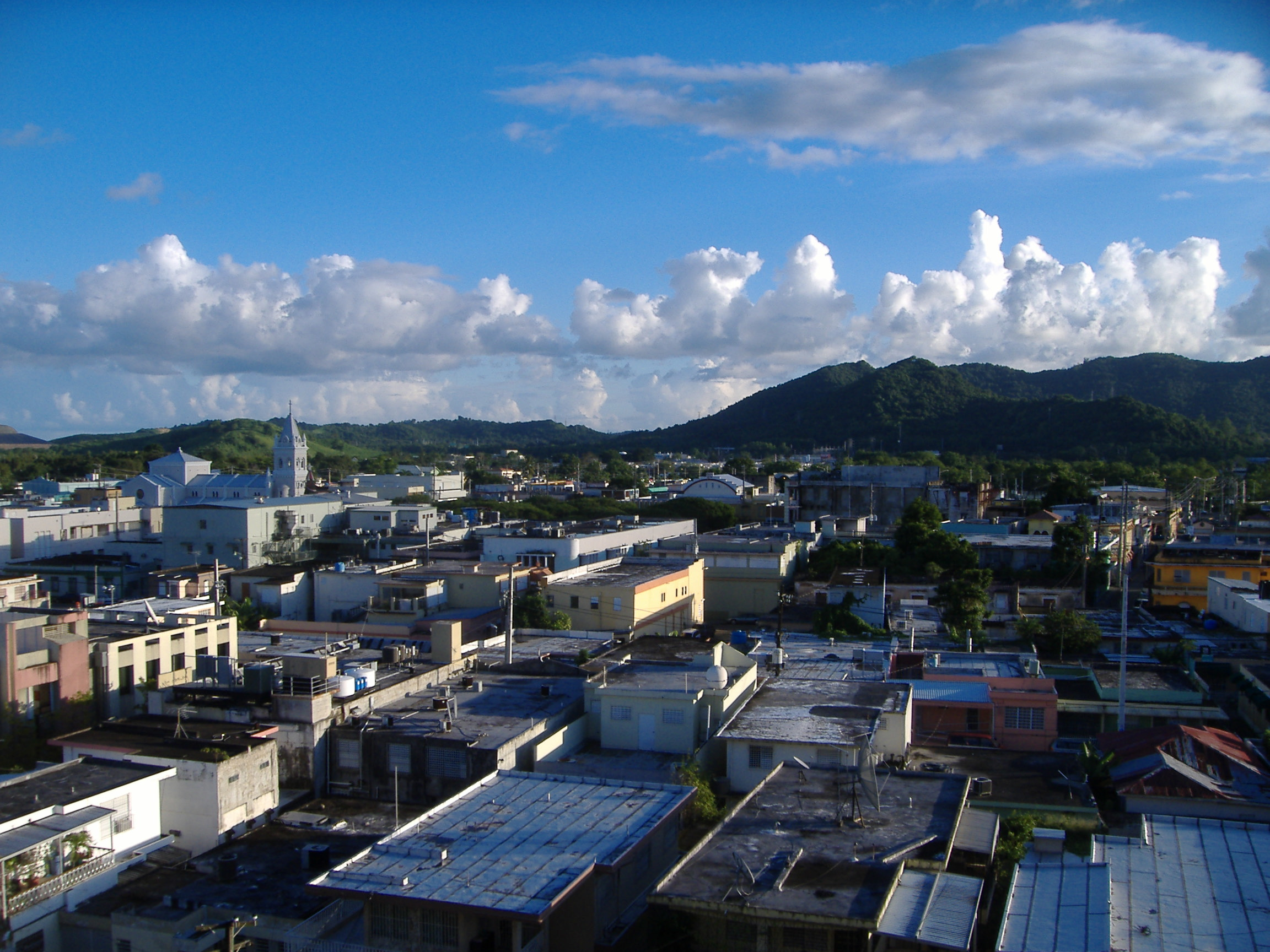
Downtown Humacao skyline from the city hall, 2007.

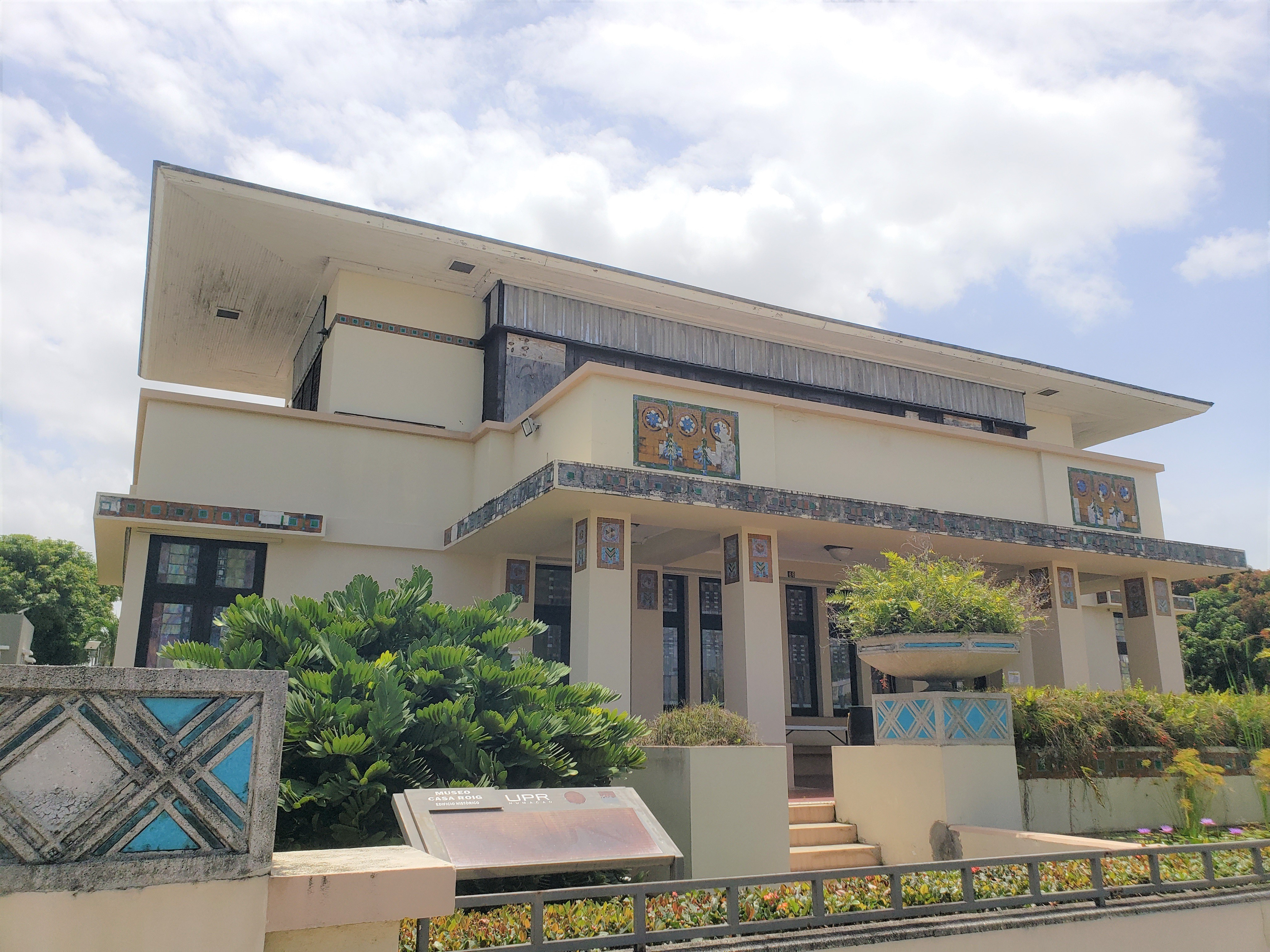
Historic Casa Roig in downtown Humacao.

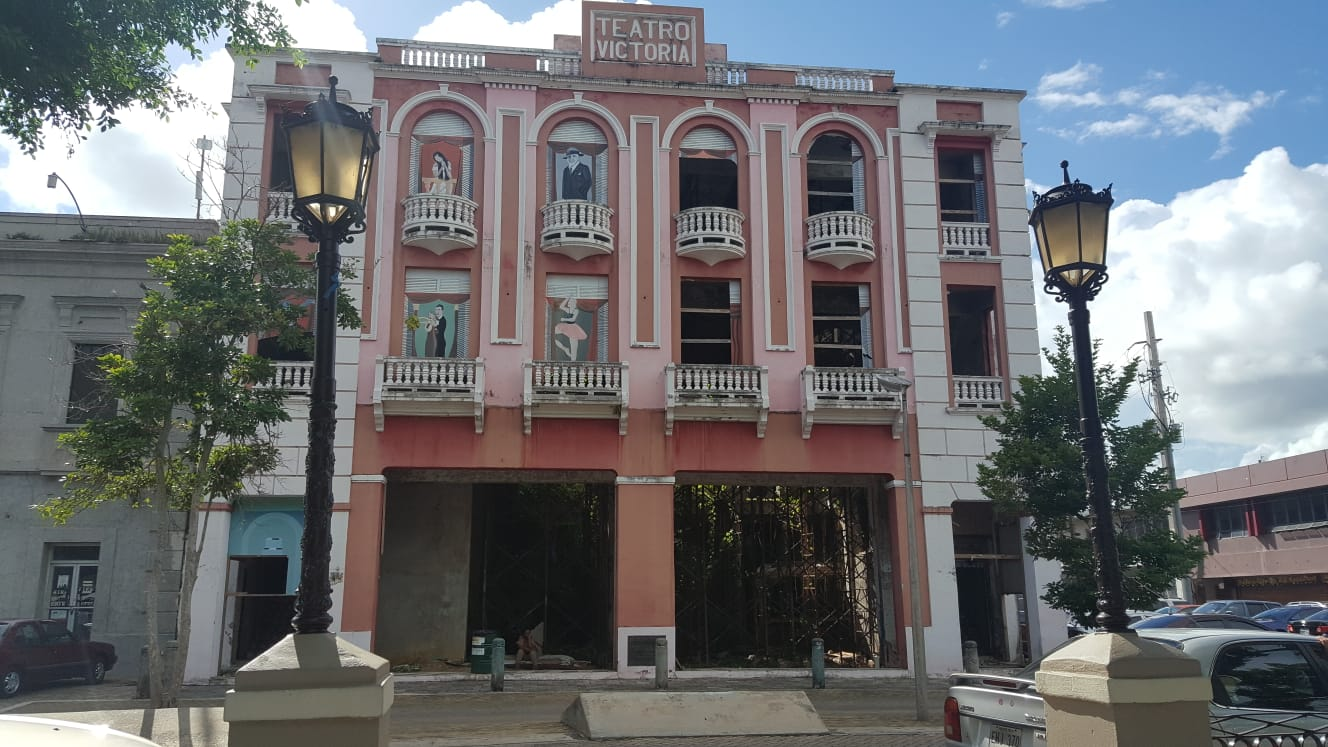
Teatro Victoria (Victoria Theater) on the western edge of the main plaza or square.

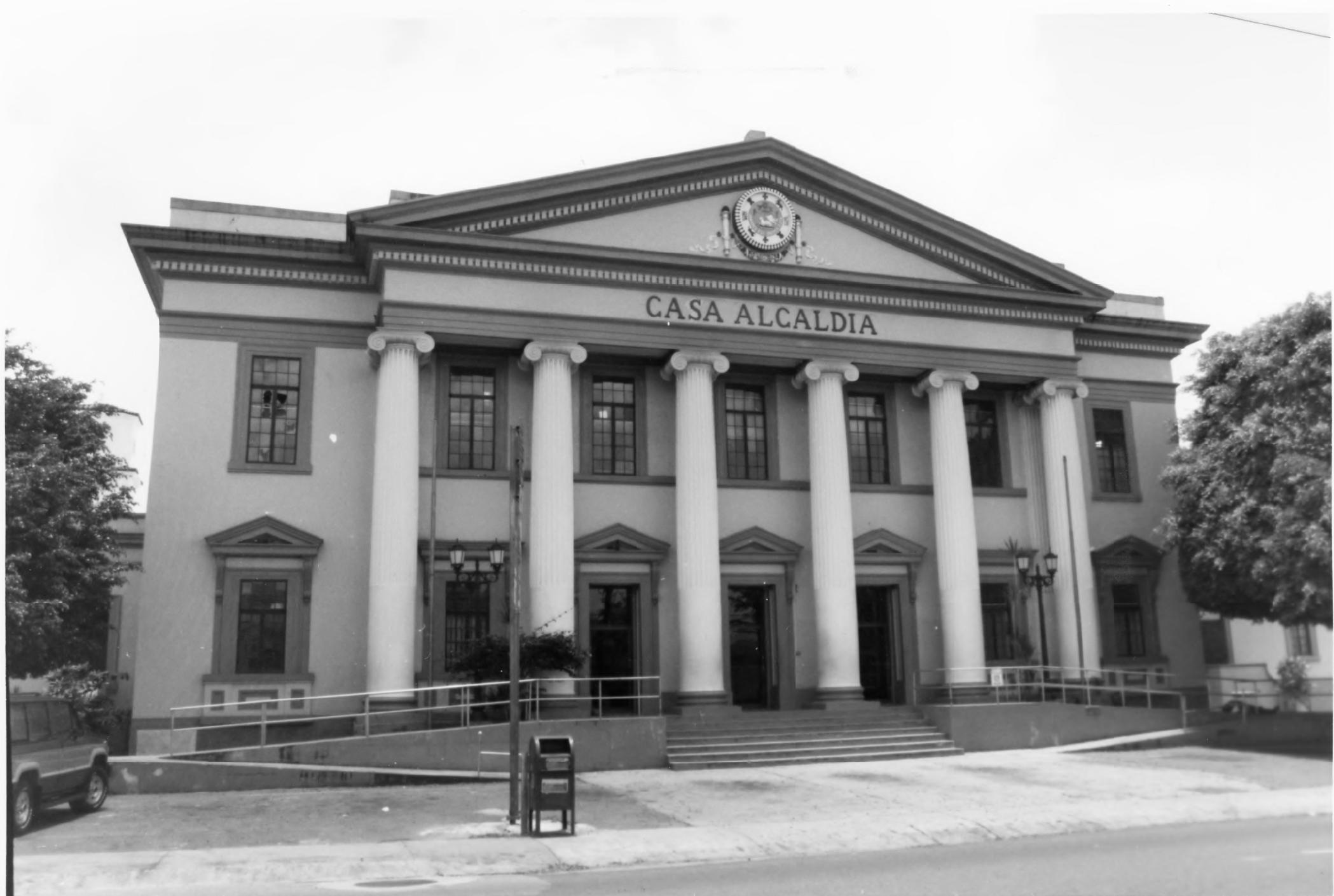
Old city hall of Humacao, now the district court.

== See also ==
- List of communities in Puerto Rico
