= Ceiba, Las Piedras, Puerto Rico =

Barrio of Puerto Rico

Ceiba
- Barrio
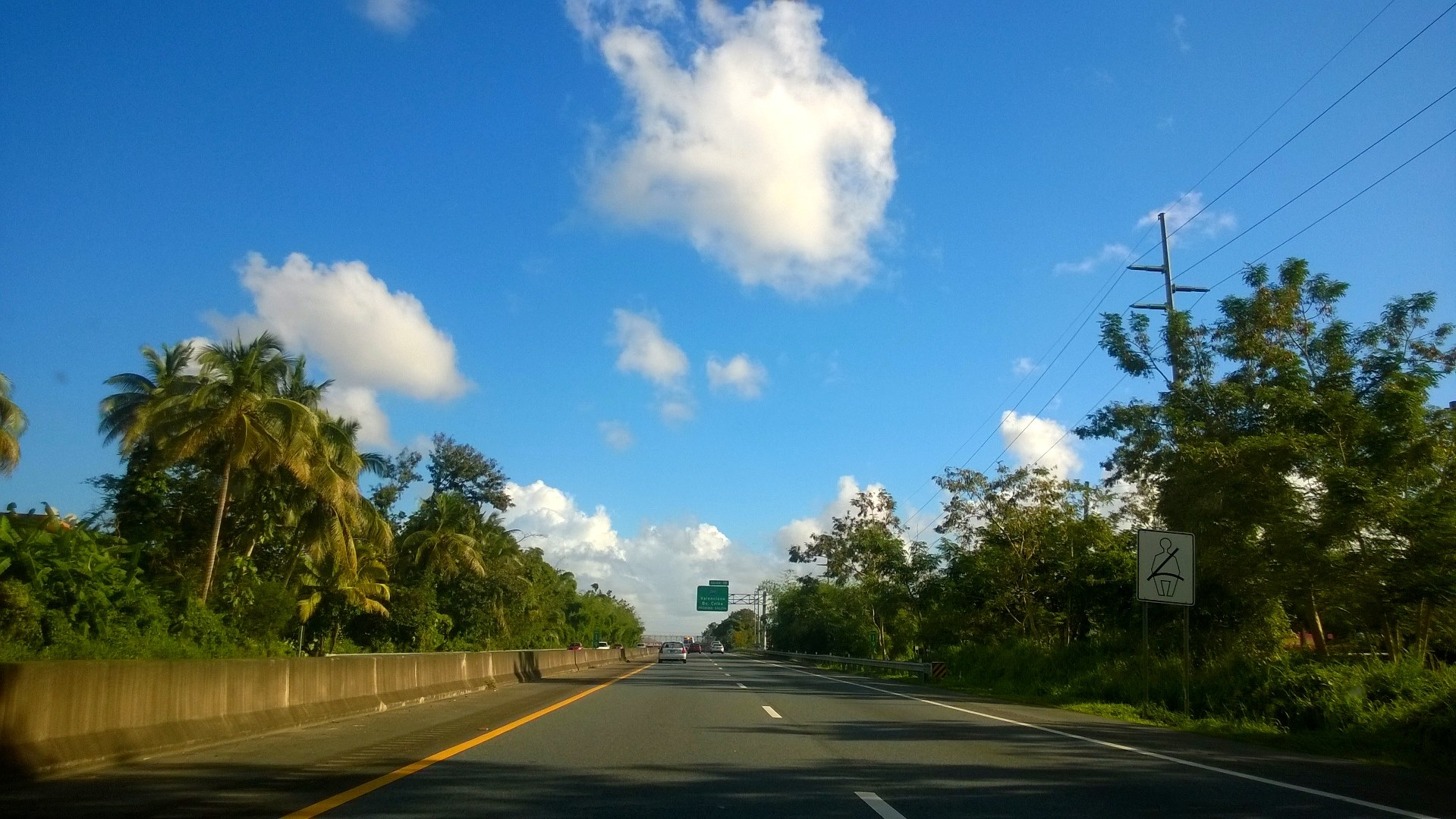
- Puerto Rico Highway 30 in Ceiba

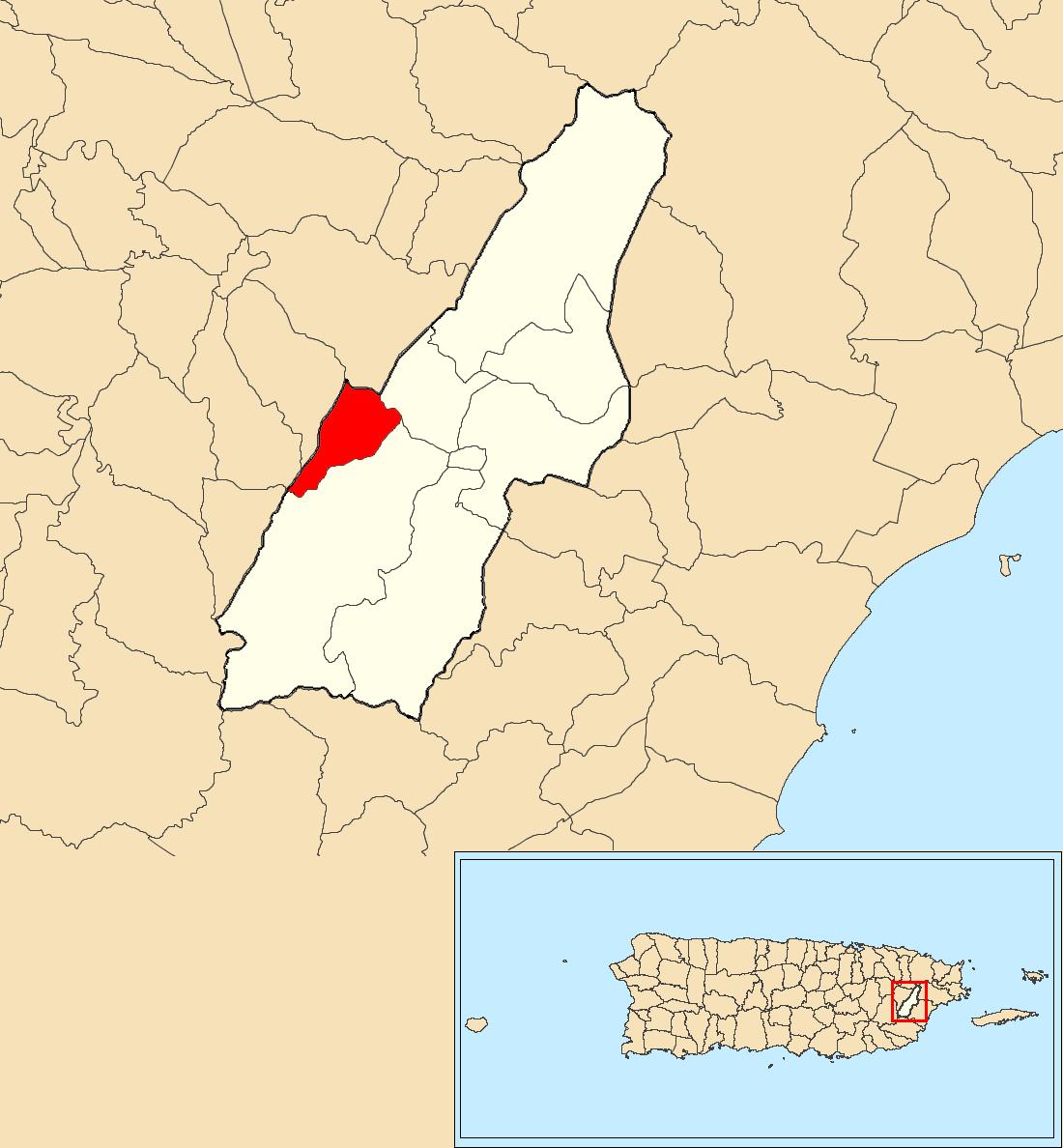
- Location of Ceiba within the municipality of Las Piedras shown in red

- Location of Puerto Rico
- Coordinates: 18°11′12″N 65°53′41″W
- Commonwealth: Puerto Rico
- Municipality: Las Piedras

Area
  - Total: 1.5 sq mi (3.9 km^{2})
  - Land: 1.5 sq mi (3.9 km^{2})
  - Water: 0 sq mi (0 km^{2})
- Elevation: 394 ft (120 m)

Population (2010)
  - Total: 2,500
  - Density: 1,666.7/sq mi (643.5/km^{2})
- Source: 2010 Census
- Time zone: UTC−4 (AST)
- ZIP Code: 00771
- Area code: 787/939

Ceiba is a barrio in the municipality of Las Piedras, Puerto Rico. Its population in 2010 was 2,500.

Historical population
| Census | Pop. | Note | %± |
|---|---|---|---|
| 1910 | 401 | | — |
| 1920 | 485 | | 20.9% |
| 1930 | 564 | | 16.3% |
| 1940 | 677 | | 20.0% |
| 1950 | 810 | | 19.6% |
| 1960 | 925 | | 14.2% |
| 1970 | 946 | | 2.3% |
| 1980 | 1,141 | | 20.6% |
| 1990 | 1,048 | | −8.2% |
| 2000 | 1,557 | | 48.6% |
| 2010 | 2,500 | | 60.6% |
U.S. Decennial Census; 1899 (shown as 1900) 1910-1930; 1930-1950 1980-2000 2010

== See also ==
- List of communities in Puerto Rico
