= Las Piedras, Puerto Rico =

Town and municipality in Puerto Rico

Las Piedras Municipio de Las Piedras
- Town and Municipality
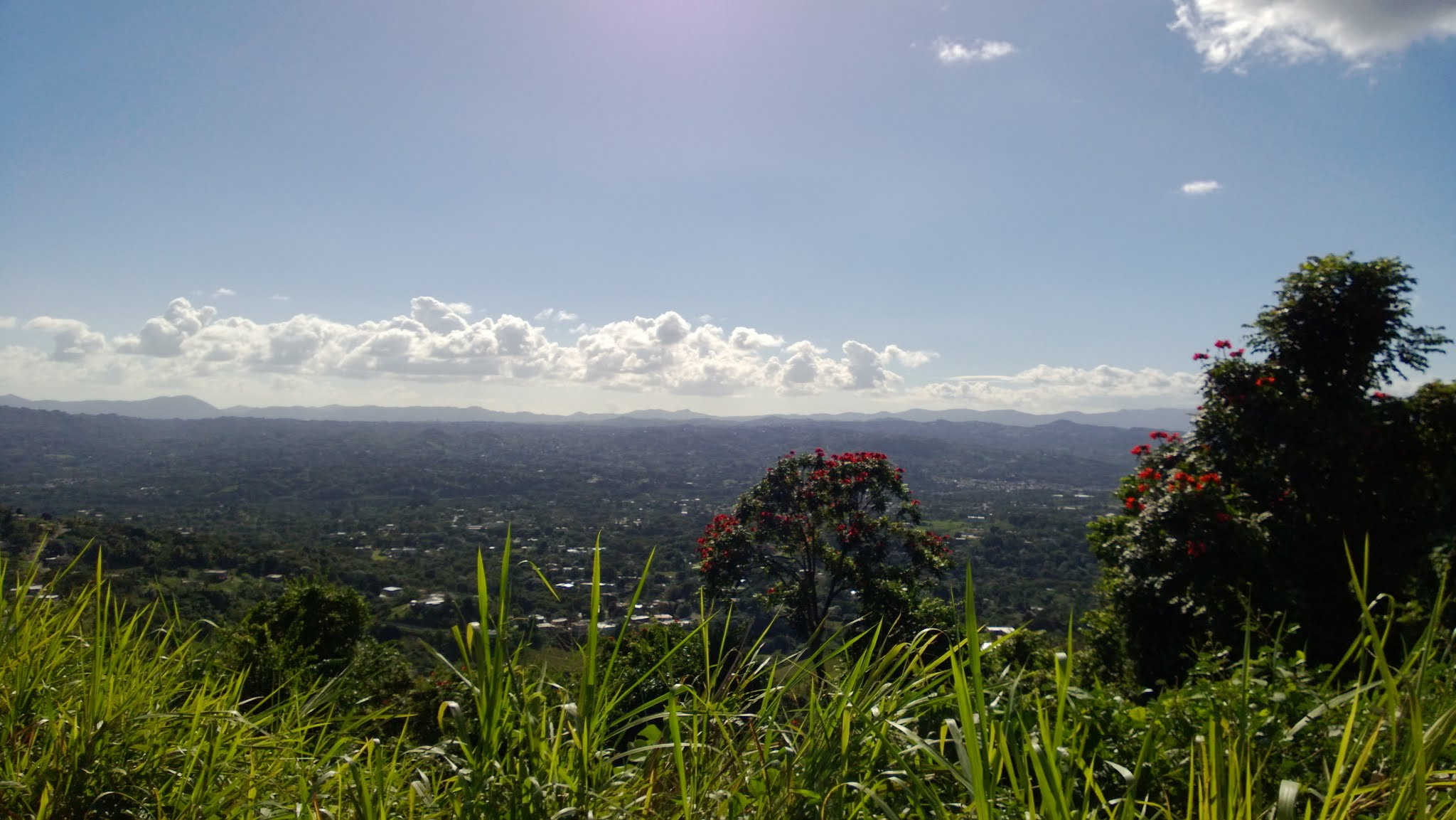
- View from Collores, Las Piedras

- Flag Coat of arms
- Nickname: "La Ciudad de los Artesanos"
- Anthem: "Somos de la Ribera"
- Map of Puerto Rico highlighting Las Piedras Municipality
- Coordinates: 18°10′59″N 65°51′59″W
- Sovereign state: United States
- Commonwealth: Puerto Rico
- Settled: 1740
- Founded: May 15, 1801
- Founder: José Tió
- Barrios: 8 barrios: Boquerón; Ceiba; Collores; El Río; Las Piedras barrio-pueblo; Montones; Quebrada Arenas; Tejas

Government
  - Mayor: Miguel "Micky" López (PNP)
  - Senatorial dist.: 7 - Humacao
  - Representative dist.: 35

Area
  - Total: 33.89 sq mi (87.8 km^{2})
  - Land: 33.88 sq mi (87.7 km^{2})
  - Water: .01 sq mi (0.026 km^{2})

Population (2020)
  - Total: 35,180
  - Estimate (2025): 34,723 ▼
  - Rank: 33rd in Puerto Rico
  - Density: 1,038/sq mi (400.9/km^{2})
- Demonym: Pedreños
- Time zone: UTC-4 (AST)
- ZIP Code: 00771
- Area code: 787/939

Las Piedras (Spanish pronunciation: [las ˈpjeðɾas]), is a town and municipality in east Puerto Rico located in the central eastern region of the island, north of Yabucoa; south of Canóvanas and Río Grande; east of Juncos and San Lorenzo; and west of Naguabo and Humacao. Las Piedras has 8 barrios including Las Piedras Pueblo (the downtown area and the administrative center of the city). It is part of the San Juan-Caguas-Guaynabo Metropolitan Statistical Area.

Las Piedras has many natural attractions such as Cueva del Indio which contains original Taino caves and paintings that denote some characteristics of the island's natives. Las Piedras is located about 45 minutes from San Juan, Puerto Rico's capital and 5 minutes from Palmas del Mar, Humacao which is one of the biggest resorts in the Caribbean.

El Toro, the highest point in the Sierra de Luquillo, is located in the boundary between the municipalities of Las Piedras and Río Grande.

== History ==
Las Piedras was founded in 1793.

Puerto Rico was ceded by Spain in the aftermath of the Spanish–American War under the terms of the Treaty of Paris of 1898 and became a territory of the United States. In 1899, the United States Department of War conducted a census of Puerto Rico finding that the population of Las Piedras was 8,602.

On September 20, 2017 Hurricane Maria struck Puerto Rico. In Las Piedras, 500 residences lost their roof. The hurricane triggered numerous landslides in Las Piedras with 205 mph winds and significant rainfall. Infrastructure in Las Piedras was heavily damaged and most regions were inaccessible immediately following the hurricane.

== Geography ==
Las Piedras is a landlocked municipality located on the eastern side of Puerto Rico. According to the 2010 U.S. Census Bureau, the municipality has a total area of 33.89 square miles (87.8 km^{2}), of which 33.88 square miles (87.7 km^{2}) is land and .01 square miles (0.026 km^{2}) is water. The highest point in the municipality is El Toro, located in the municipal boundary with Río Grande, which rises to 3,524 feet (1,074 m), and is the highest point in both the Sierra de Luquillo and El Yunque National Forest.

=== Barrios ===
Like all municipalities of Puerto Rico, Las Piedras is subdivided into barrios. The municipal buildings, central square and large Catholic church are located near the center of the municipality, in a small barrio referred to as "el pueblo".

1. Boquerón
2. Ceiba
3. Collores
4. El Río
5. Las Piedras barrio-pueblo
6. Montones
7. Quebrada Arenas
8. Tejas

=== Sectors ===
Barrios (which are like minor civil divisions) and subbarrios, are further subdivided into smaller areas called sectores (sectors in English). The types of sectores may vary, from normally sector to urbanización to reparto to barriada to residencial, among others.

=== Special Communities ===
Comunidades Especiales de Puerto Rico (Special Communities of Puerto Rico) are marginalized communities whose citizens are experiencing a certain amount of social exclusion. A map shows these communities occur in nearly every municipality of the commonwealth. Of the 742 places that were on the list in 2014, the following barrios, communities, sectors, or neighborhoods were in Las Piedras: Quebrada Grande neighborhood, Rivera neighborhood (Hoyo Gardens), Boquerón, Cinco Cuerdas, El Cerrito, Fondo del Saco, Lijas and Pueblito del Río.

== Demographics ==
Historical population
Census	Pop.	Note	%±
1900	8,602		—
1920	10,620		—
1930	12,907		21.5%
1940	15,389		19.2%
1950	16,208		5.3%
1960	17,047		5.2%
1970	18,112		6.2%
1980	22,412		23.7%
1990	27,896		24.5%
2000	34,485		23.6%
2010	38,675		12.2%
2020	35,180		−9.0%
2025 (est.)	34,723	▼	−1.3%
U.S. Decennial Census; 1899 (shown as 1900) 1910-1930; 1930-1950 1960-2000 2010 2020

== Tourism ==
=== Landmarks and places of interest ===
- La Cueva del Indio
- Monte del Retiro
- Artesanial Walk
- Francisco Negrón Park
- Las Piedras Historic Museum
- Panoramic Route 917

== Economy ==
=== Industry ===
- Manufacturing: computers and pharmaceutical.

== Culture ==
=== Festivals and events ===
Las Piedras celebrates its patron saint festival in December. The Fiestas Patronales Nuestra Señora de Asunción is a religious and cultural celebration that generally features parades, games, artisans, amusement rides, regional food, and live entertainment.

Other festivals and events celebrated in Las Piedras include:

- Güiro Festival - March
- Folk Culture Festival – April
- Cross Festival – May
- Youth Festival – July
- Folk Festival – September
- Festival Artesanal - October
- Roast Pig Festival – November

== Government ==
All municipalities in Puerto Rico are administered by a mayor, elected every four years. The current mayor of Las Piedras is Miguel López Rivera, of the New Progressive Party (PNP). He was first elected at the 2008 general elections.

The city belongs to the Puerto Rico Senatorial district VII, which is represented by two Senators. In 2024, Wanda Soto Tolentino and Luis Daniel Colón La Santa were elected as District Senators.

== Transportation ==
There are 24 bridges in Las Piedras.

== Symbols ==
The municipio has an official flag and coat of arms.

=== Flag ===
The flag of Las Piedras has three horizontal stripes of equal width, the stripe at the top is colored white, the center stripe is colored green and the bottom stripe is colored blue. In the middle of the flag rests an image of the Taíno sun in yellow.

=== Coat of arms ===
In a silver field resides a blue monogram of the Holy Virgin, topped by a blue crown. Seven silver stones border the silver field and at the tip of the shield resides the Taíno sun in gold denominated as the "Sun of Las Piedras".

== Notable natives ==
- Juan Manuel Lebrón - Comedian
- Miguel Hernández Agosto - Puerto Rico Senate President (1988–1992).
- Nicky Cruz - evangelist, reformed gang leader, author of bestselling book, "Run Baby Run".
- Miguel A. Loíz Zayas - Writer and politician, Senator for the district of Humacao (1993-1996).

== See also ==
- List of Puerto Ricans
- History of Puerto Rico
- Did you know-Puerto Rico?
