= Montones =

Barrio of Las Piedras, Puerto Rico

- Barrio
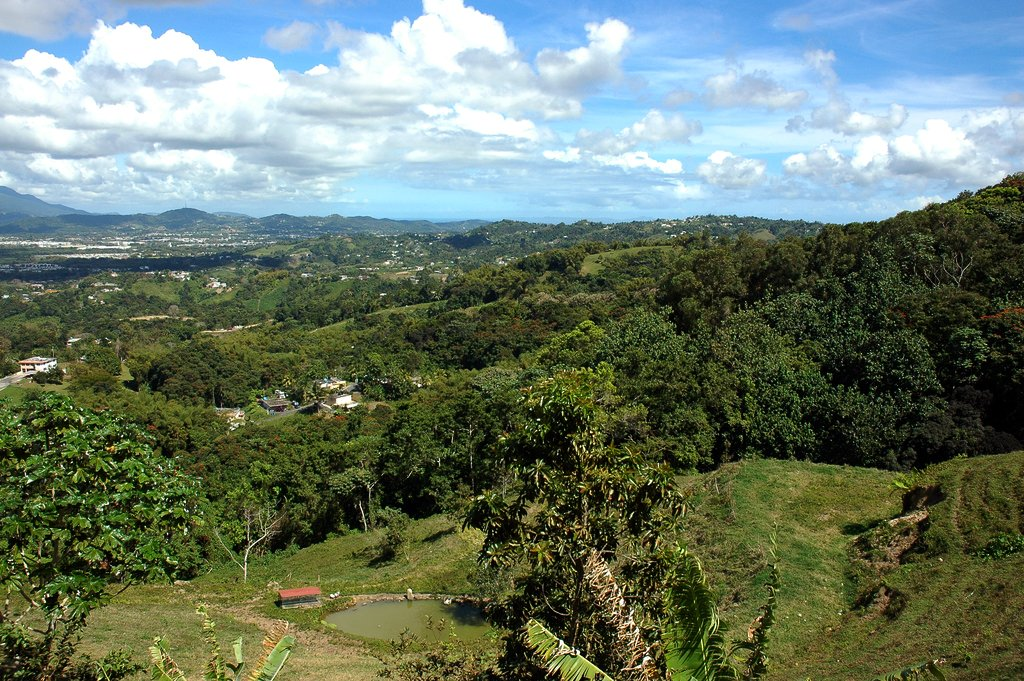
- Montones barrio in Las Piedras

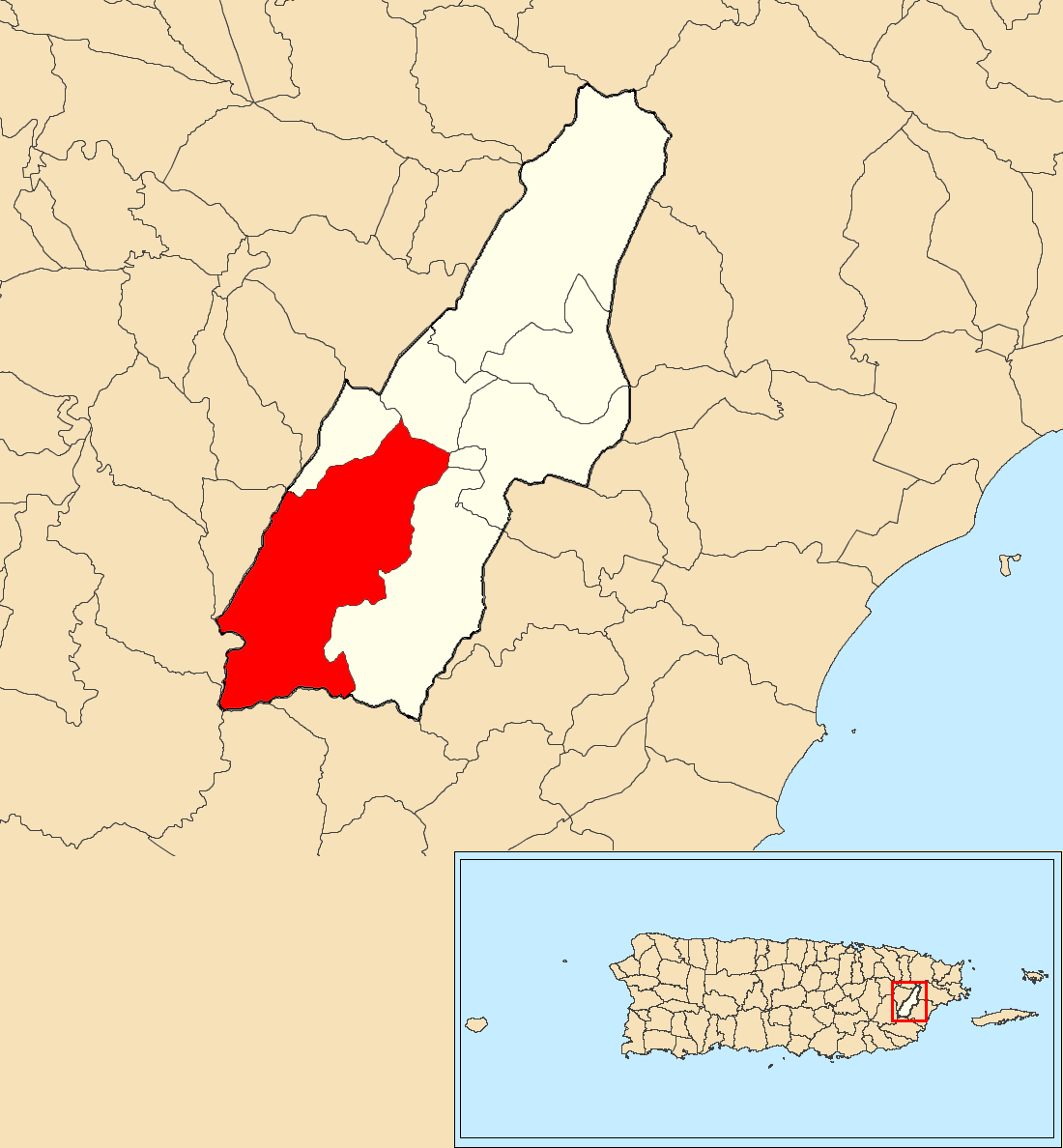
- Location of Montones within the municipality of Las Piedras shown in red

- Location of Puerto Rico
- Coordinates: 18°09′17″N 65°54′05″W
- Commonwealth: Puerto Rico
- Municipality: Las Piedras

Area
  - Total: 8.79 sq mi (22.8 km^{2})
  - Land: 8.79 sq mi (22.8 km^{2})
  - Water: 0 sq mi (0 km^{2})
- Elevation: 653 ft (199 m)

Population (2010)
  - Total: 9,332
  - Density: 1,061.7/sq mi (409.9/km^{2})
- Source: 2010 Census
- Time zone: UTC−4 (AST)
- ZIP Code: 00771
- Area code: 787/939

Montones is a barrio in the municipality of Las Piedras, Puerto Rico. Its population in 2010 was 9,332.

== History ==
Montones was in Spain's gazetteers until Puerto Rico was ceded by Spain in the aftermath of the Spanish–American War under the terms of the Treaty of Paris of 1898 and became an unincorporated territory of the United States. In 1899, the United States Department of War conducted a census of Puerto Rico. Montones was two separate barrios: Montonos Abajo had a population of 899 and Montones Arriba had a population of 937.

Historical population
Census	Pop.	Note	%±
1900	1,836		—
1910	1,784		−2.8%
1920	2,451		37.4%
1930	2,791		13.9%
1940	3,476		24.5%
1950	3,028		−12.9%
1960	3,284		8.5%
1970	0		−100.0%
1980	3,683		—
1990	5,099		38.4%
2000	6,096		19.6%
2010	9,332		53.1%
U.S. Decennial Census; 1899 (shown as 1900) 1910-1930; 1930-1950 1980-2000 2010

== See also ==
- List of communities in Puerto Rico
