= Puerto Rico Highway 908 =

Highway in Puerto Rico

Highway 908
- Ruta 908
- Carretera Profesor Gilberto Rivera Ortiz

Route information
- Maintained by Puerto Rico DTPW
- Length: 13.5 km (8.4 mi)
- Existed: 1953–present

Major junctions
- South end: PR-3 in Playa–Aguacate
- PR-909 in Aguacate–Mariana; PR-9908 in Tejas–Mariana; PR-9904 in Tejas–Tejas–Tejas; PR-9908 in Tejas–Tejas; PR-914 in Tejas–Tejas; PR-30 in Tejas
- North end: PR-3 in Cataño

Location
- Country: United States
- Territory: Puerto Rico
- Municipalities: Yabucoa, Las Piedras, Humacao

Highway system
- Roads in Puerto Rico; List
← PR-901	→ PR-939

Puerto Rico Highway 908 (PR-908) is a main highway in the city of Humacao, Puerto Rico. It begins in PR-3 as a two-lane per direction road, which ends being that way approaching University of Puerto Rico at Humacao. It intersects PR-30 just before approaching the institution. After that it becomes a rural one-lane per direction road. It goes back to PR-3, where it ends, near Yabucoa, Puerto Rico.

== Major intersections ==
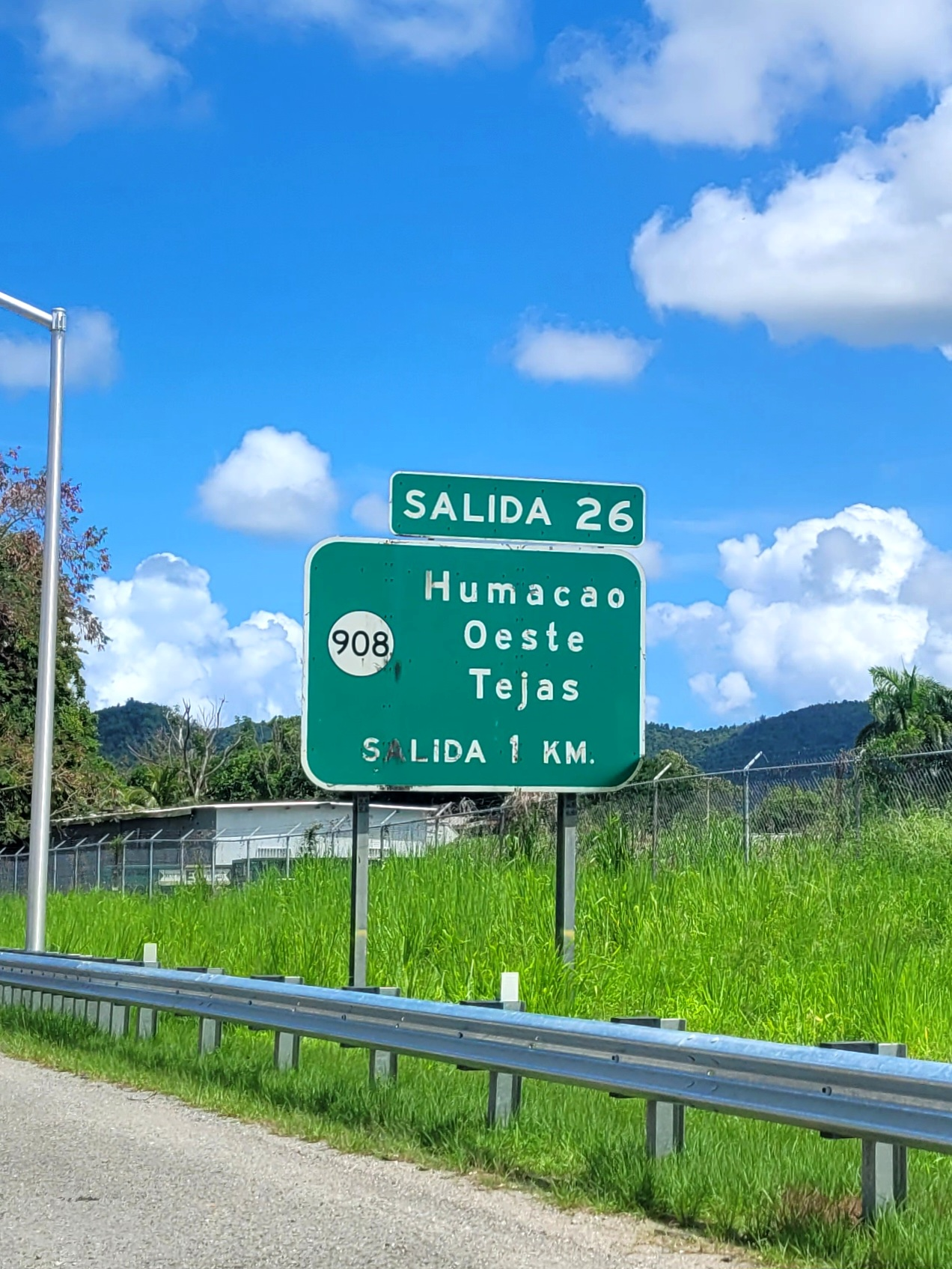
PR-30 east approaching exit 26 to PR-908

Municipality	Location	km	mi	Destinations	Notes
Yabucoa	Playa–Aguacate line	13.5	8.4	PR-3 – Yabucoa, Humacao	Southern terminus of PR-908
Yabucoa–Humacao municipal line	Aguacate–Mariana line	10.3– 10.2	6.4– 6.3	PR-909 – Mariana	
Yabucoa–Humacao municipal line	Tejas–Mariana line	8.8	5.5	PR-9908 – Mariana	
Humacao–Las Piedras– Yabucoa municipal tripoint	Tejas–Tejas– Tejas tripoint	8.0	5.0	PR-9904 – Tejas	
Humacao–Las Piedras municipal line	Tejas–Tejas line	5.1	3.2	PR-9908 – Mariana	
Humacao–Las Piedras municipal line	Tejas–Tejas line	4.1	2.5	PR-914 – Tejas	
Humacao	Tejas	0.7	0.43	PR-30 (Expreso Cruz Ortiz Stella) – Caguas, Yabucoa	PR-30 exits 26 and 28B; diamond interchange
Humacao	Cataño	0.0	0.0	PR-3 – Humacao, Yabucoa	Northern terminus of PR-908
1.000 mi = 1.609 km; 1.000 km = 0.621 mi

== See also ==
- 1953 Puerto Rico highway renumbering
