= Marianne (given name) =

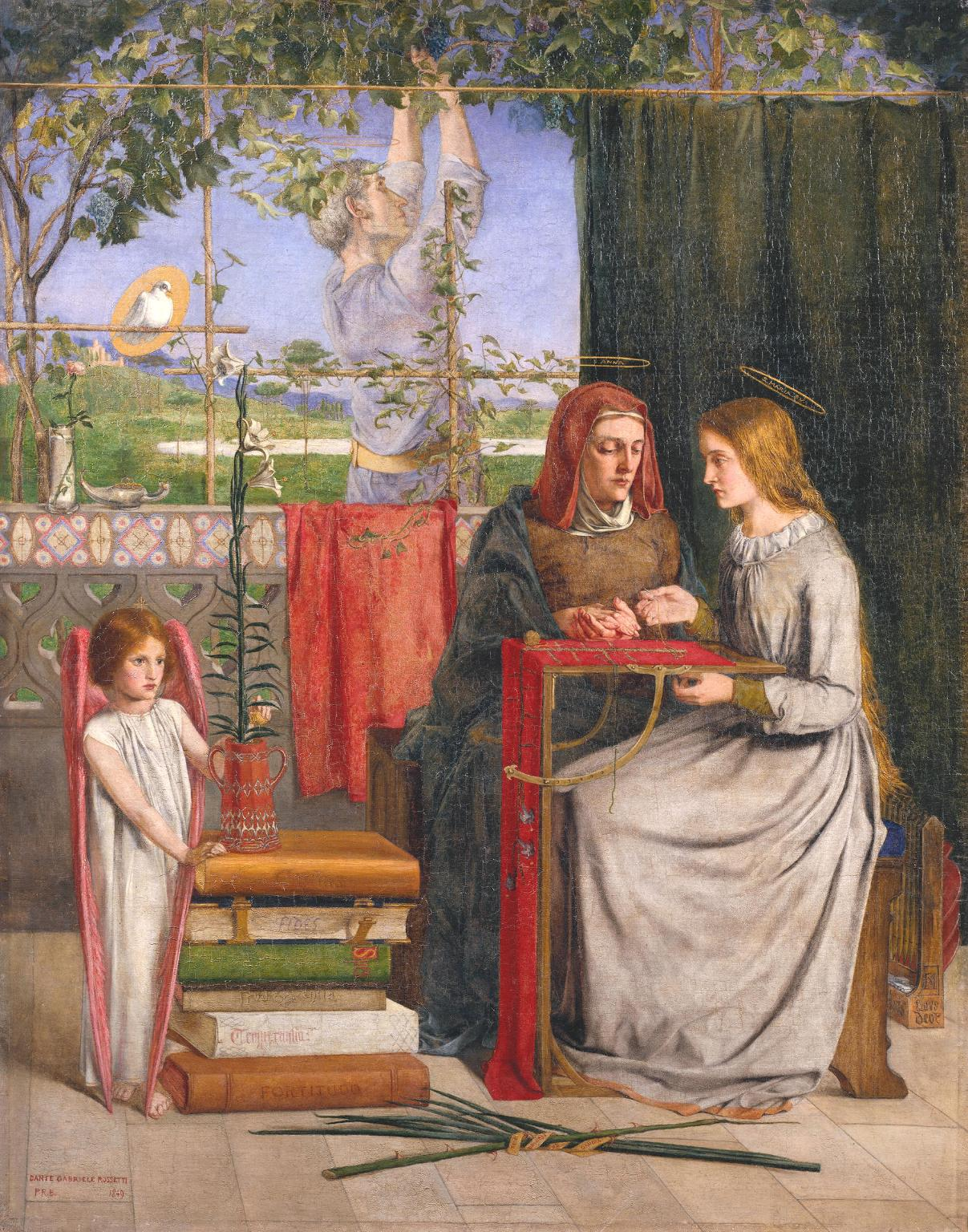
- Marianne is popular in part because it combines the names of the Virgin Mary and her mother Saint Anne, seen here depicted in a painting by Dante Gabriel Rossetti.
- Gender: female

Origin
- Origin: Hebrew
- Meaning: Variant of Miriam or combination of Mary and Anne.

Other names
- Related names: Marianna, Mariana, Mary, Anne, Mariamne, Marian, Miriam, Meleana (Hawaiian)

Marianne is a female name. It is the French version of the Greek Mariamne, which is a variant of Mary, ultimately from the Hebrew Miriam (מִרְיָם Miryám), Mirjam (Aramaic: Mariam). In late Greek Marianna (Μαριάννα) was used.

In 18th-century France, Marianne became a popular name as a variant of Marian and Marie. It can also be seen as a combination of Marie and Anne. It gave inspiration to several double names such as Marie-Anne and Anne-Marie, as well as other variants such as Anna Maria, Ana-Maria and Marianna, and alternate spellings Mary Ann and Mary Anne. The combination of the two names has also been popular with Christians because Saint Anne is traditionally the name of the mother of the Virgin Mary.

== People with the given name Marianne ==
- Marianne, Princess zu Sayn-Wittgenstein-Sayn (1919–2025), German noble and photographer
- Marianne Ackerman (born 1952), Canadian novelist, playwright, and journalist
- Marianne Alissan de la Tour (1730–1789), French writer, correspondent with Jean-Jacques Rousseau
- Marianne Bachmeier, German mother (1950–1996)
- Marianne Berndt (born 1978), shot putter and discus thrower
- Marianne Beuchert (1924–2007), German gardener and florist
- Marianne Bigum (born 1983), Danish politician
- Marianne Brocklehurst (1832–1898), English traveller and collector of Egyptian antiquities
- Marianne Burkert-Eulitz (born 1972), German politician
- Marianne Buttenschon, American politician
- Marianne Clausen (1947–2014), Danish musicologist and choir conductor
- Marianne Cope (1838–1918), German-born American nun
- Marianne Cronin (born 1990), English-Irish novelist
- Marianne Davies, musician
- Marianne Devaux (born 1962), New Caledonian politician
- Marianne Dickerson (1960–2015), long-distance runner
- Marianne Dubois (born 1957), French politician
- Marianne Ehrenström (1773–1867), artist
- Marianne Ehrmann (1755–1795), novelist
- Marianne Elliott (born 1966), British theatre director
- Marianne Elliott (historian) (born 1948), Irish historian
- Marianne Faithfull (1946–2025), singer
- Marianne Fatton (born 1995), Swiss ski mountaineer
- Marianne Fay, American economist and writer
- Marianne Fredriksson (1927–2007), author
- Marianne Fundahn (born 1967), Swedish politician
- Marianne Giovacchini (born 2005), Brazilian rhythmic gymnast
- Marianne Githens (1936–2018), political scientist, feminist, and author
- Marianne Golz (1895–1943), opera singer and World War II resistance member
- Marianne Grunberg-Manago (1921–2013), Russian-born French biochemist.
- Marianne Hefti (born 1953), Swiss alpine skier
- Marianne Ihlen (1935–2016), Wife of Norwegian author Axel Jensen and later the muse and girlfriend of Leonard Cohen
- Marianne Jean-Baptiste (born 1967), actress
- Marianne W. Lewis, Dean of the Cass Business School
- Marianne Limpert (born 1972), swimmer
- Marianne Lindsten-Thomasson (1909–1979), physician; Sweden's first female district medical officer during the 1940s
- Marianne Littke (born 1965), Swedish politician
- Marianne Löfgren (1910–1957), actor
- Marianne Lundquist (1931–2020), Swedish swimmer
- Marianne Mirage (born 1989), Italian singer-songwriter
- Marianne Moore (1887–1972), American poet
- Marianne Muis (born 1968), swimmer
- Marianne Pettersen (born 1975), Norwegian footballer
- Marianne Rendón (born 1990), American actress
- Marianne Rosenberg (born 1955), singer
- Marianne Steinbrecher (born 1983), volleyball player
- Marianne Timmer (born 1974), speed skater
- Marianne Vaatstra (1982–1999), Dutch murder victim
- Marianne Vos (born 1987), road-, track- and cross-cyclist
- Marianne von Werefkin (1860–1938), painter
- Marianne Williamson (born 1952), activist, humanitarian, entrepreneur and candidate for President of the United States in 2020 and 2024.
- Marianne Zechmeister (born 1960), German alpine skier

== People with the given name Mariane ==
- Mariane Pearl, French journalist
- Mariane Amaro, French-Portuguese football defender
- Mariane Chan, Hong Kong actress
- Mariane van Hogendorp, Dutch feminist
- A character in Tartuffe, a comedy by Molière

== People with the given name Marianna ==
- Marianna Agostini (born 2002), Italian para-cyclist
- Marianna Anaya, American politician
- Marianna Efstratiou (born 1955), Greek singer
- Marianna Grznárová (1941–2025), Slovak writer
- Marianna Hill (born 1942), American actress
- Marianna Jagerčíková (born 1985), Slovak ski mountaineer
- Marianna Kambouroglou (1819–1890), Greek folklorist
- Marianna Latsis, Greek businesswoman
- Marianna Liik (born 1992), Estonian composer
- Marianna Lubomirska (1693–1729), Polish noble
- Marianna Lymperta (born 1979), Greek swimmer
- Marianna Malińska (1767–1797), Polish ballerina
- Marianna Martines (1744–1812), Austrian composer, pianist and singer
- Marianna Popiełuszko (1920–2013), Polish farmer and mother of a Solidarity chaplain and a Catholic priest, Jerzy Popiełuszko
- Marianna Spring (born 1996), British journalist
- Marianna Vardinoyannis (1937–2023), Greek UNESCO ambassador
- Marianna Yarovskaya (born 1971), Russian-American documentary filmmaker
- Marianna Zachariadi (1990–2013), Greek pole vaulter
- Marianna Zorba (born 1967), Greek singer

== Fictional characters ==
- Marianne, a character in the light novel series Shakugan no Shana
- Marianne, the protagonist of a trilogy of novels by Sheri S. Tepper
- Marianne, the protagonist of musical fantasy film Strange Magic
- Marianne vi Britannia from the anime and manga series Code Geass
- Marianne Bryant, played by Amanda Bynes in the film Easy A
- Marianne Dashwood, in Jane Austen's novel Sense and Sensibility
- Marianne von Edmund, a character from the video game Fire Emblem: Three Houses
- Marianne Lane, played by Tilda Swinton in A Bigger Splash
- Marianne Sheridan, the protagonist of the Irish novel Normal People
- Marianne Thornberry, from animated television series The Wild Thornberrys
- Marianne, a character in the film Portrait of a Lady on Fire
- Marianne, a character from My Chemical Romance's 2025 tour Long Live The Black Parade

== See also ==
- Maryanne, given name
- Marianna (disambiguation)
- Mariana (disambiguation)
