= Mariana (given name) =

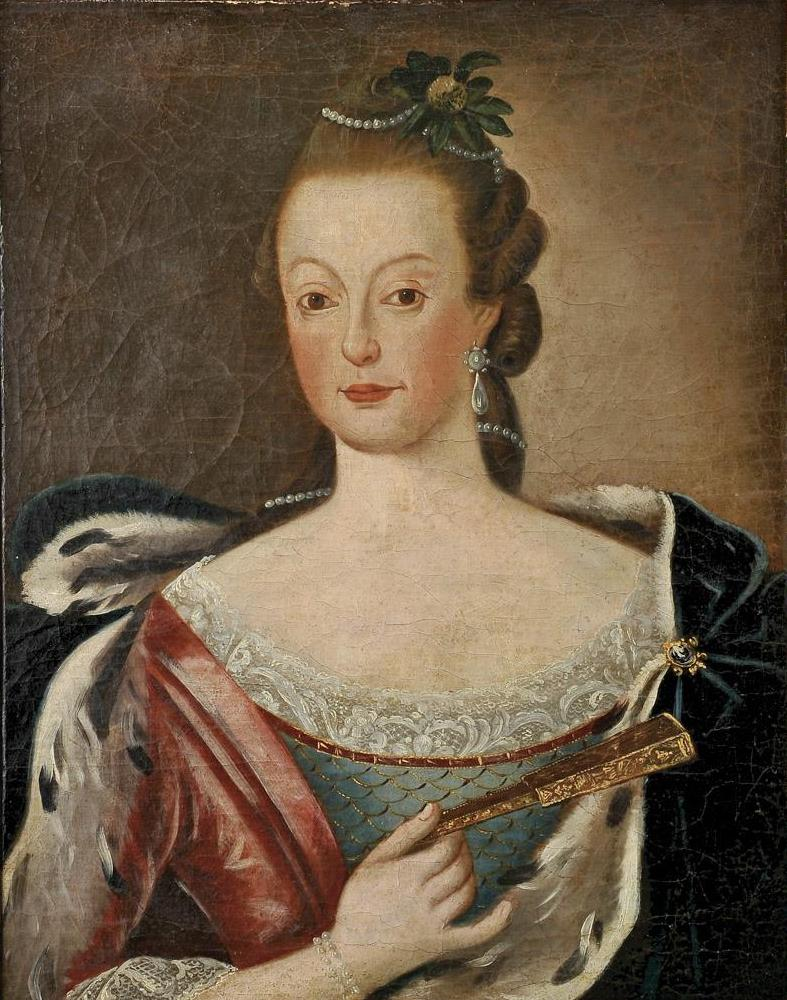
- Mariana Victoria of Spain
- Pronunciation: má-ree-á-na / má-di-á-na
- Gender: Female
- Language: Italian, Portuguese, Romanian, Spanish

Origin
- Origin: Latin: Marianus
- Meaning: Daughter of Marius
- Region of origin: Romance-speaking Europe

Other names
- Related names: Marianne, Marianna, Marian (Czech; Slovak), Mariano (male variant), Mary Anne
- See also: Maria

Mariana is a feminine given name of Latin origin. The masculine equivalent is Marianus, which is derived from Marius. Marianus became Mariano in Italian, Spanish and Portuguese.

== Nobles ==
- Mariana of Austria (1634–1696), Queen consort of Spain
- Marianna Lubomirska (1693–1729), Polish noble
- Mariana Koskull (1785–1841), Swedish noble
- Mariana Victoria of Spain (1718–1781), Queen of Portugal
- Infanta Mariana Francisca of Portugal (1736–1813), daughter of King Joseph I of Portugal
- Infanta Mariana Vitória of Portugal (1768–1788), daughter of Queen Maria I of Portugal and King Peter III of Portugal

== Writers ==
- Mariana Codruț (born 1956), Romanian poet, writer and journalist
- Mariana Enríquez (born 1973), Argentine writer and journalist,
- Mariana Frenk-Westheim (1898–2004), German-Mexican writer and translator
- Mariana Griswold Van Rensselaer (1851–1931), American author
- Mariana Starke (c. 1761–1831), English author
- Juan de Mariana (1536–1624), Spanish Jesuit and historian

== Entertainers ==
- Mariana Aydar (born 1980), Brazilian singer
- Mariana Čengel Solčanská (born 1978), Slovak director
- Mariana Cordero, Spanish actress
- Marianna Efstratiou (born 1962), Greek singer
- Mariana Levy (1966–2005), Mexican actress, singer, and television host
- Mariana Molina (born 1990), Brazilian actress
- Mariana Nicolescu (1948–2022), Romanian opera singer
- Mariana Ochoa (born 1979), Mexican singer and actress
- Mariana Popova (born 1978), Bulgarian singer
- Mariana Renata (born 1983), Indonesian actress
- Mariana Seoane (born 1976), Mexican actress, model, and singer
- Mariana Sîrbu (died 2023), Romanian violinist
- Mariana Todorova (born 1974), Bulgarian violinist
- Mariana Varela (born 1996), Miss Universe Argentina 2019 and Miss Grand Argentina 2020
- Mariana Ximenes (born 1981), Brazilian actress

== Athletes ==
- Mariana Avitia (born 1993), Mexican archer
- Mariana Chirila (born 1964), Romanian distance runner
- Mariana Constantin (born 1960), Romanian artistic gymnast
- Mariana Díaz Oliva (born 1976), Argentinian tennis player
- Mariana Vitória Gonçalves (born 2005), Brazilian rhythmic gymnast
- Mariana Henriques (born 1994), Angolan swimmer
- Mariana Ohata (born 1978), Brazilian athlete
- Mariana Pajón (born 1991), Colombian cyclist
- Mariana Roriz (born 1980), Brazilian water polo player
- Mariana Simeanu (born 1964), Romanian middle-distance runner
- Mariana Simionescu (born 1956), Romanian tennis player
- Mariana Solomon (born 1980), Romanian triple jumper
- Mariana Zúñiga (born 2002), Chilean Paralympic archer

== Other people ==
- Mariana Becker (born early 1970s), Brazilian sports journalist and television reporter
- Mariana Bracetti (1825–1903), leader of the Puerto Rico independence movement
- Mariana Conti (born 1985), Brazilian sociologist and politician
- Mariana Wright Chapman (1843-1907), American social reformer, suffragist
- Mariana Drăgescu (1912–2013), Romanian military aviator during World War II
- Mariana J. Kaplan, Mexican-American rheumatologist and physician-scientist
- Marianna Knottenbelt (born 1949), Dutch-Canadian photographer, architect and real-estate developer
- Mariana Kotzeva (born 1967), Bulgarian statistician and econometrician
- Mariana Loya (born 1979), American beauty queen
- Mariana Mazzucato, born June 16, 1968) Italian economist
- Mariana Pfaelzer (1926–2015), United States federal judge
- Mariana de Pineda Muñoz (1804–1831), martyr of Spanish liberalism
- Marianna Pineda (1925–1996), American sculptor
- Mariana Wolfner, American molecular biologist and geneticist

== See also ==
- Marianna (given name)
- Marijana
- Maryanne
