= Marianne (disambiguation) =

Marianne is the national personification of France.

Marianne may also refer to:

== Film and television ==
- Marianne (1929 silent film), an American film directed by Robert Z. Leonard
- Marianne (1929 musical film), a remake of the above, also directed by Leonard
- Marianne (1953 film), Swedish drama film directed by Egil Holmsen
- Marianne (1955 film), or Marianne of My Youth, a French-West German drama film
- Marianne (2011 film), a Swedish horror film
- Marianne (TV series), a 2019 French horror streaming series

== Songs ==
- "Marianne" (Fontaines D.C. song), 2026
- "Marianne" (Sergio Endrigo song), representing Italy at Eurovision 1968; covered by Cliff Richard, 1968
- "Marianne" (Terry Gilkyson song), written by Roaring Lion; covered by Terry Gilkyson and the Easy Riders, and by the Hilltoppers, 1957
- "Marianne", by Gene Pitney, 1965
- "Marianne", by the Human League from Holiday '80, 1980
- "Marianne", by Stephen Stills from Stephen Stills 2, 1971
- "Marianne", by Tori Amos from Boys for Pele, 1996

== Other uses ==
- Marianne (candy), a Finnish mint chocolate candy
- Marianne (given name), including a list of people and fictional characters with the name
- Marianne (magazine, 1932–1940) a French illustrative magazine
- Marianne (magazine), a French news magazine
- Marianne, Pennsylvania, US
- Marianne Island, a small granitic island of the Seychelles
- Marianne, an 1876 novel by George Sand

== See also ==
- Maryanne, a given name
- Mary Ann (disambiguation)
- Marianna (disambiguation)
