= Puerto Rico Highway 60 =

Highway in Puerto Rico

Highway 60
- Ruta 60
- Avenida Dionisio Casillas

Route information
- Maintained by Puerto Rico DTPW
- Length: 3.6 km (2.2 mi)

Major junctions
- West end: PR-30 in Tejas
- PR-198 in Mabú; PR-924 in Humacao barrio-pueblo–Río Abajo
- East end: PR-3 in Río Abajo

Location
- Country: United States
- Territory: Puerto Rico
- Municipalities: Humacao

Highway system
- Roads in Puerto Rico; List
← PR-54	→ PR-63

Puerto Rico Highway 60 (PR-60) or Avenida Dionisio Casillas is a 3.55-kilometre-long (2.21 mi) freeway entirely located in Humacao, Puerto Rico. This highway extends from Puerto Rico Highway 30 to Puerto Rico Highway 3 as a bypass located north of downtown Humacao.

== Route description ==
From west to east, PR-60 begins at PR-30 interchange in Tejas and ends at PR-3 intersection in Río Abajo, with two lanes per direction along the entire length. This freeway has two exits north of downtown Humacao:

- PR-198, Humacao Centro: Access to Hospital Ryder, one of the most important hospitals in Humacao; Downtown Humacao and East Las Piedras
- PR-924, Antón Ruiz: Access to Downtown Humacao and barrio Antón Ruíz.

== History ==
The freeway was part of PR-30 before the latter, then called Puerto Rico Alt Highway 30 (or ramal), ended in the intersection with PR-909 near Mariana. When PR-53 was under construction, PR-30 was also extended to its terminus and the Department of Transportation and Public Works of Puerto Rico (DTOP) renumbered the final 1.9 miles (3 kilometers) of former PR-30 to PR-60.

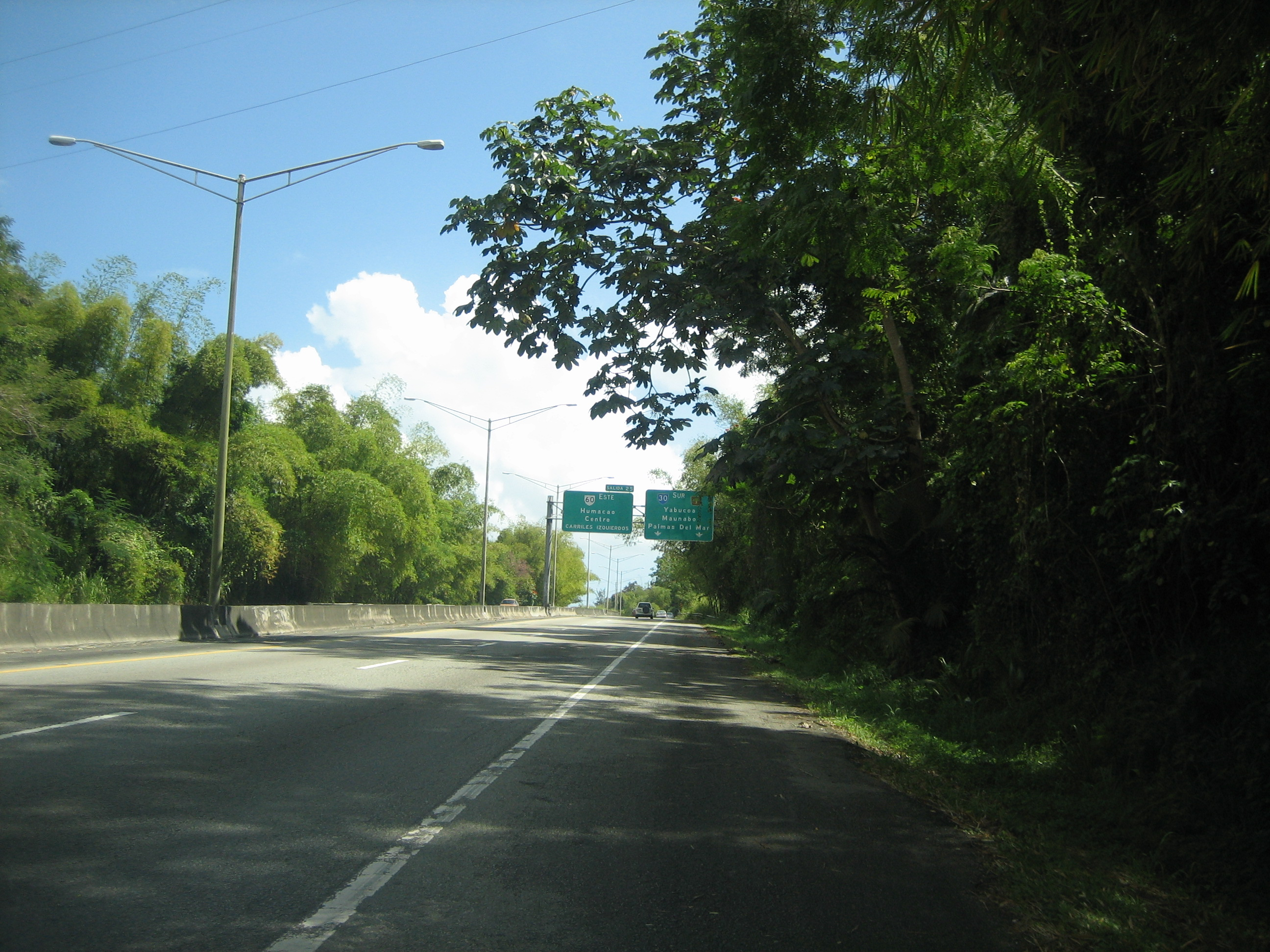
PR-30 approaching PR-60 in Humacao

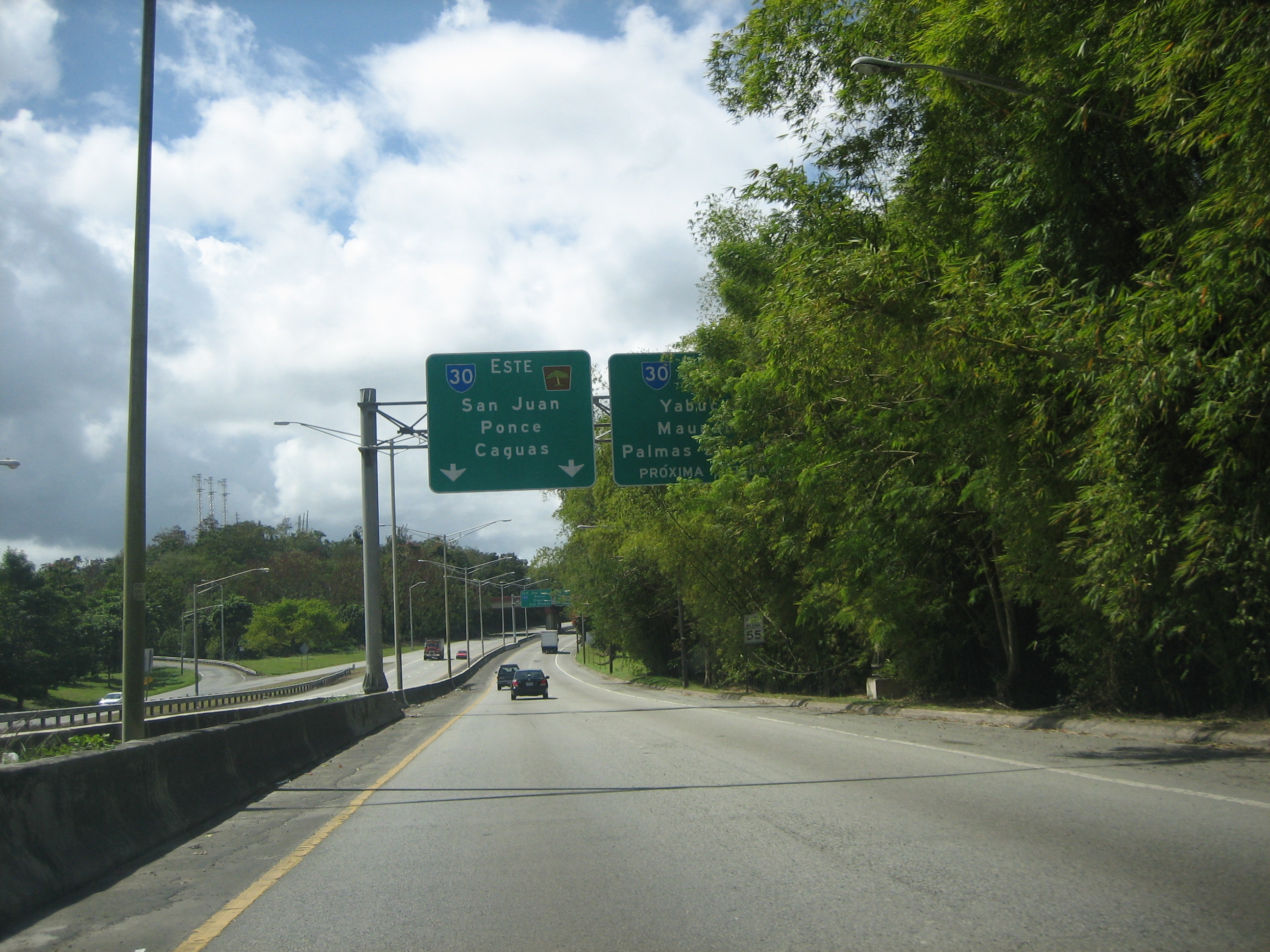
PR-60 going west to PR-30

== Exit list ==
The entire route is located in Humacao. All exits are unnumbered.

Location	km	mi	Destinations	Notes
Tejas	0.0	0.0	PR-30 (Expreso Cruz Ortiz Stella) – Caguas	Western terminus of PR-60; PR-30 exit 25; trumpet interchange
Mabú	0.7– 0.8	0.43– 0.50	PR-198 – Humacao, Las Piedras	Partial cloverleaf interchange
Humacao barrio-pueblo–Río Abajo line	1.9– 3.0	1.2– 1.9	PR-924 – Humacao	Antón Ruíz; diamond interchange
Río Abajo	3.6	2.2	PR-3 – Humacao, Naguabo	Eastern terminus of PR-60; at-grade intersection
1.000 mi = 1.609 km; 1.000 km = 0.621 mi
