= Puerto Rico Highway 30 =

Highway in Puerto Rico

Highway 30
- Ruta 30
- Expreso Cruz Ortiz Stella

Route information
- Maintained by Puerto Rico DTPW
- Length: 30.1 km (18.7 mi)

Major junctions
- West end: PR-1 / PR-52 in Bairoa
- PR-189 in Rincón; PR-203 in Rincón; PR-181 / PR-9944 in Rincón–Mamey–Jaguar; PR-185 in Mamey; PR-189 / PR-9919 in Juncos barrio-pueblo; PR-31 / PR-189 in Ceiba Norte; PR-204 in Ceiba–Montones; PR-183 in Montones; PR-60 in Tejas; PR-3 in Cataño
- East end: PR-53 in Buena Vista

Location
- Country: United States
- Territory: Puerto Rico
- Municipalities: Caguas, Gurabo, Juncos, Las Piedras, Humacao

Highway system
- Roads in Puerto Rico; List
← PR-29	→ PR-31

Puerto Rico Highway 30 (PR-30), known as Expreso Cruz Ortiz Stella, is a main freeway in eastern Puerto Rico which connects the city of Caguas to the municipality of Humacao. With a length of 30.1 km (18.7 mi), it extends from PR-1 interchange in Bairoa barrio to PR-53 junction in Buena Vista barrio.

== Route description ==
Puerto Rico Highway 30 by municipality

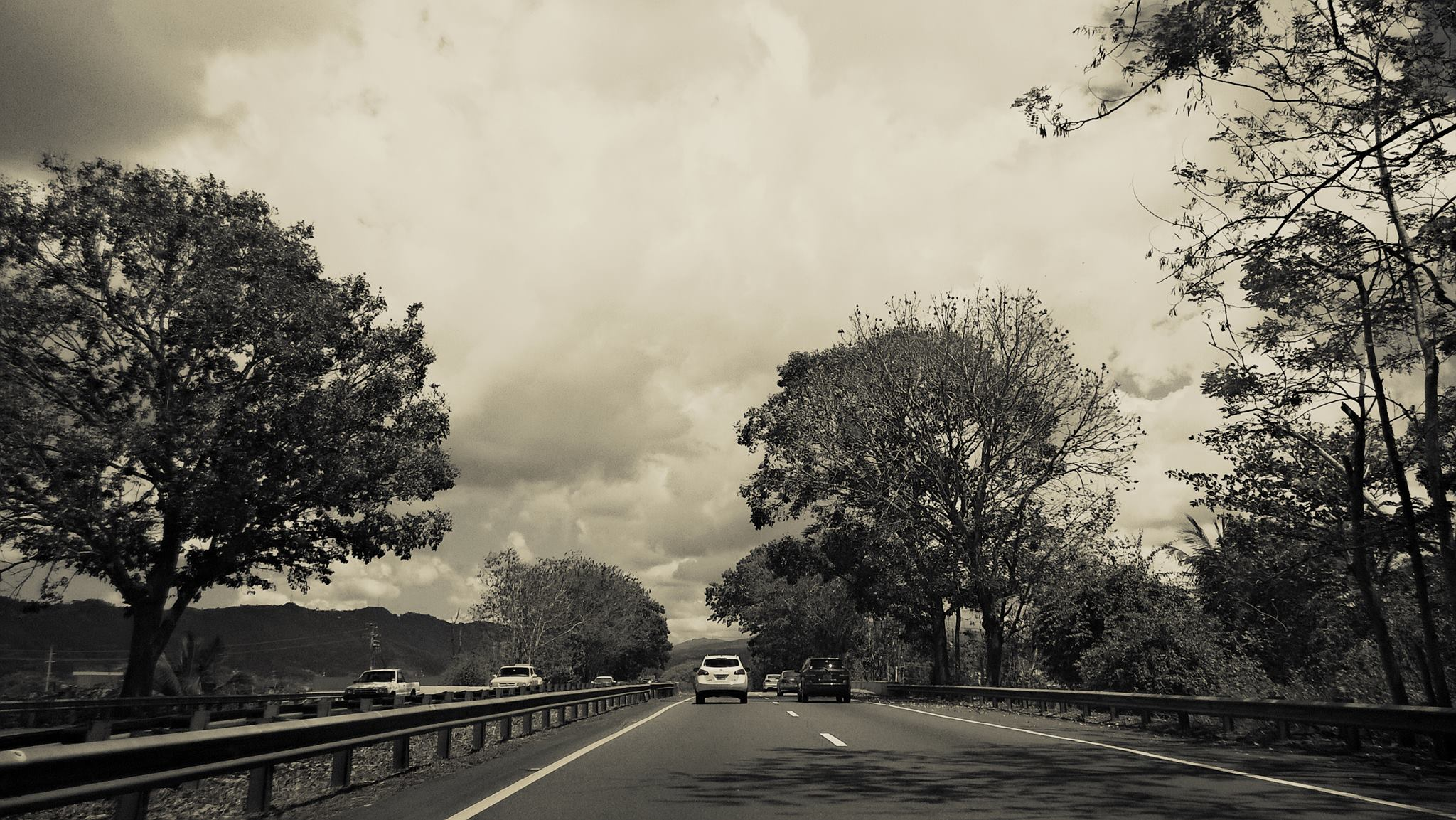
Heading east in Gurabo

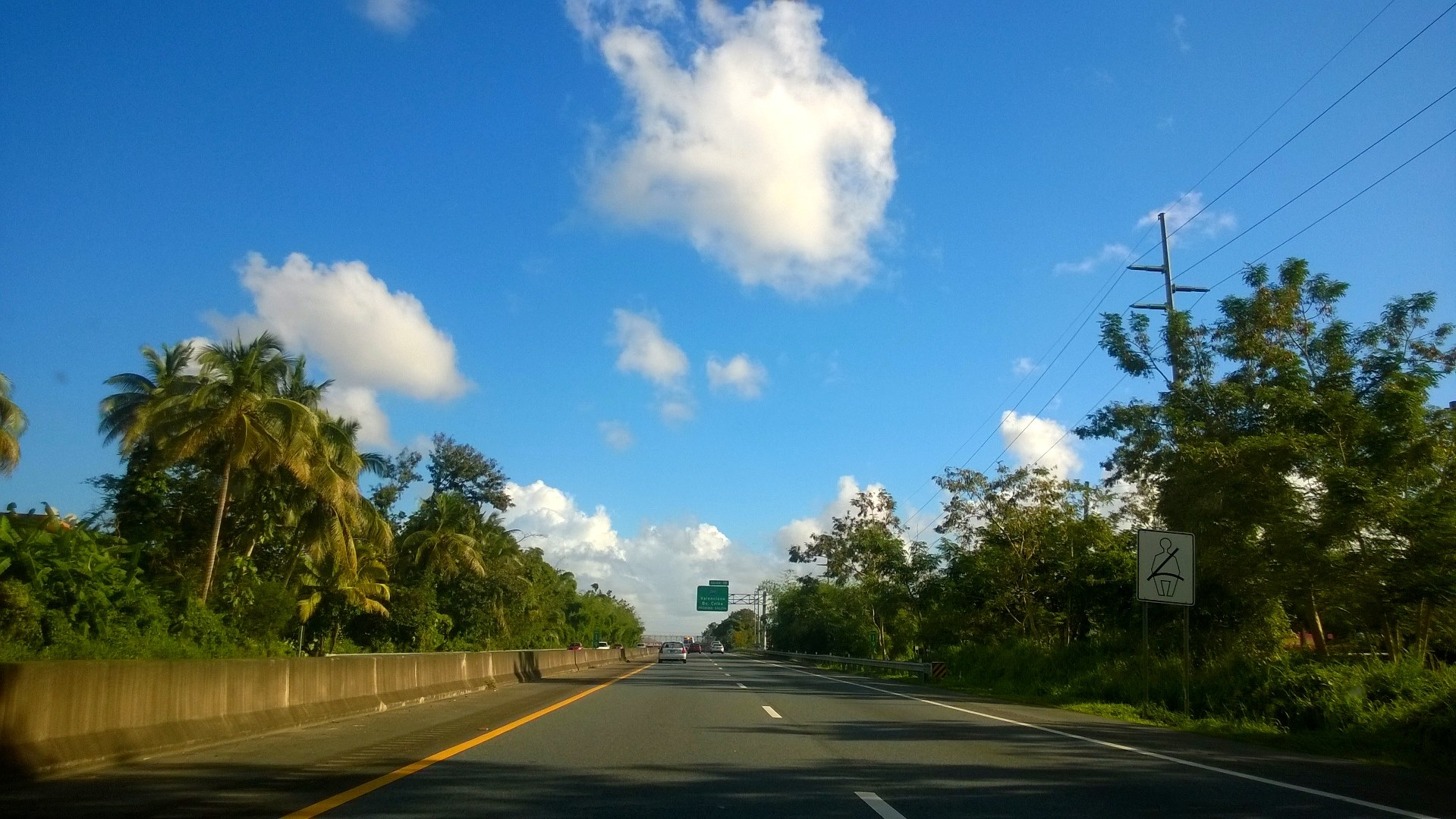
Heading east in Las Piedras

=== Problems ===
This highway is considered highly dangerous due to the number of cars that transit it, partly because many people in Humacao and nearby municipalities work in San Juan. There are also concerns of cracks and holes, most of them in the right lane in both directions. The highway is in frequent repairs, especially the Caguas-Gurabo segment. There are possibilities that this highway has not been properly repaired, intentionally, because drivers speed up to more than the specified speed limit (55 mph) and having the highway repaired would mean more fatal accidents as a good highway would invite people to drive faster. Nevertheless, the segment between Caguas and Gurabo has been repaired and repaved, and the segment in Las Piedras is being repaired and expanded near the exit to PR-183 mainly because of the large number of vehicles taking this exit and creating a congestion in the freeway. The segments between Gurabo and Juncos are not repaired and have a significant number of cracks and holes. Another problem with PR-30 is that it turns very slippery when wet and cars still drive above speed limit (55 mph). Many people have died in the freeway and is considered one of the most dangerous in the island.

=== Parallel routes ===
PR-198 and PR-189 parallel the freeway almost in its entire length, and they never get far from the freeway. PR-189 (Caguas–Juncos) has two junctions with PR-30 ― one in Gurabo near Caguas and the other in Juncos. PR-198 does the same in Juncos and Humacao. PR-183 also parallels the highway but it lies significantly south, and two connectors and one exit connect them ― PR-203 from Gurabo to San Lorenzo, PR-204 in Las Piedras and the Exit 21 in the same town. PR-183 ends in Las Piedras.

== Exit list ==
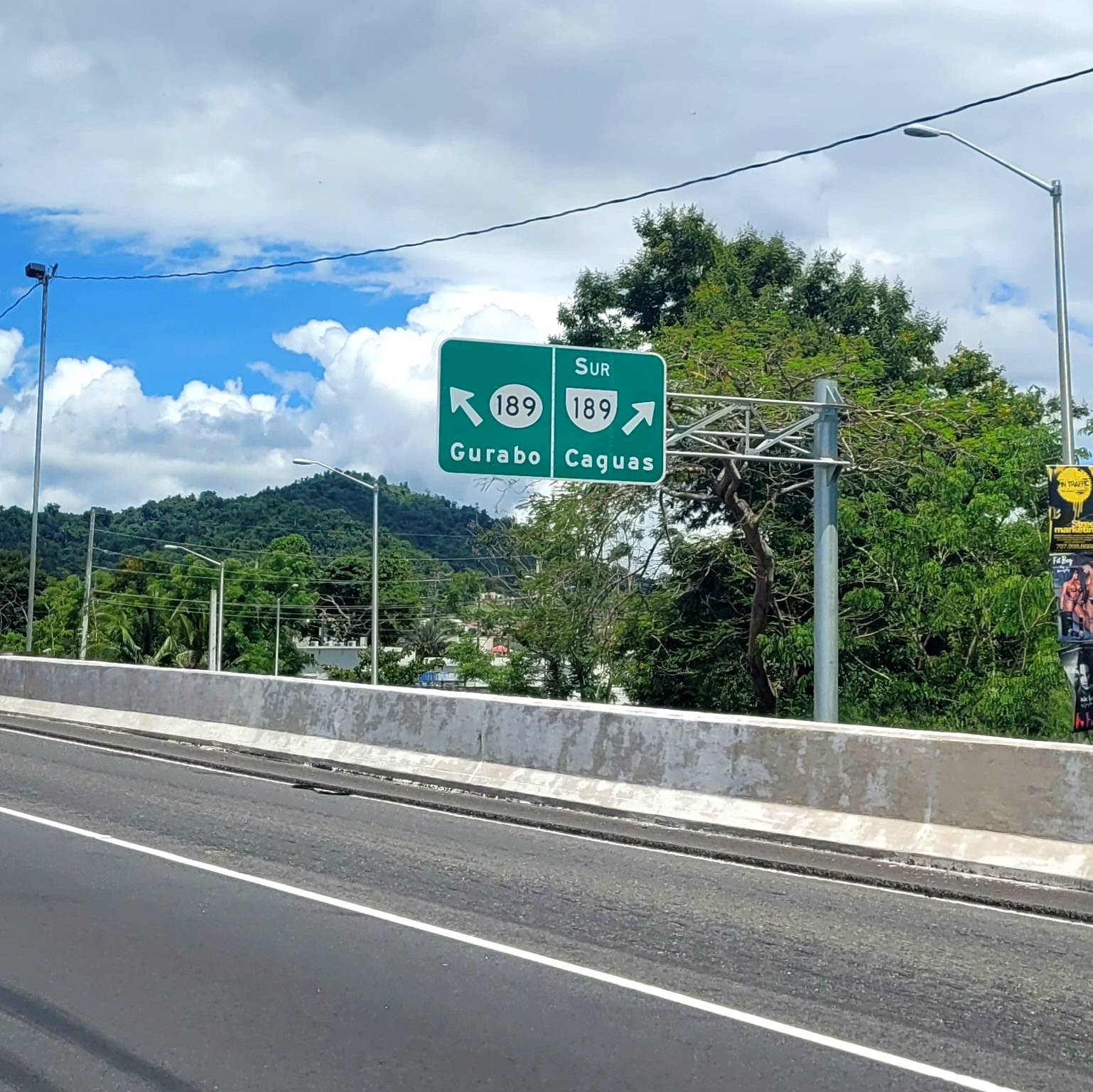
PR-30 east at exit 4 to PR-189 in Gurabo

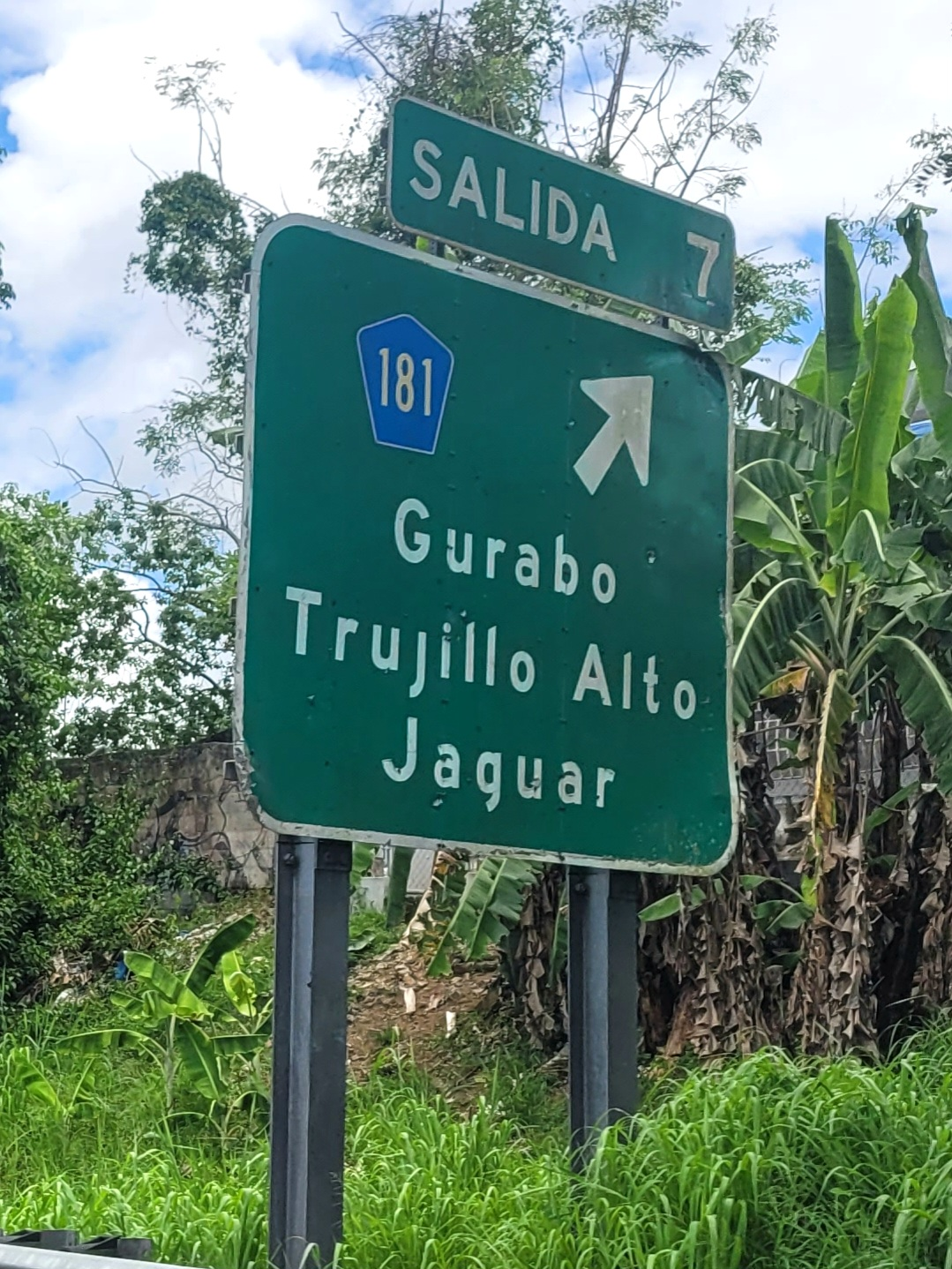
PR-30 east at exit 7 to PR-181 in Gurabo

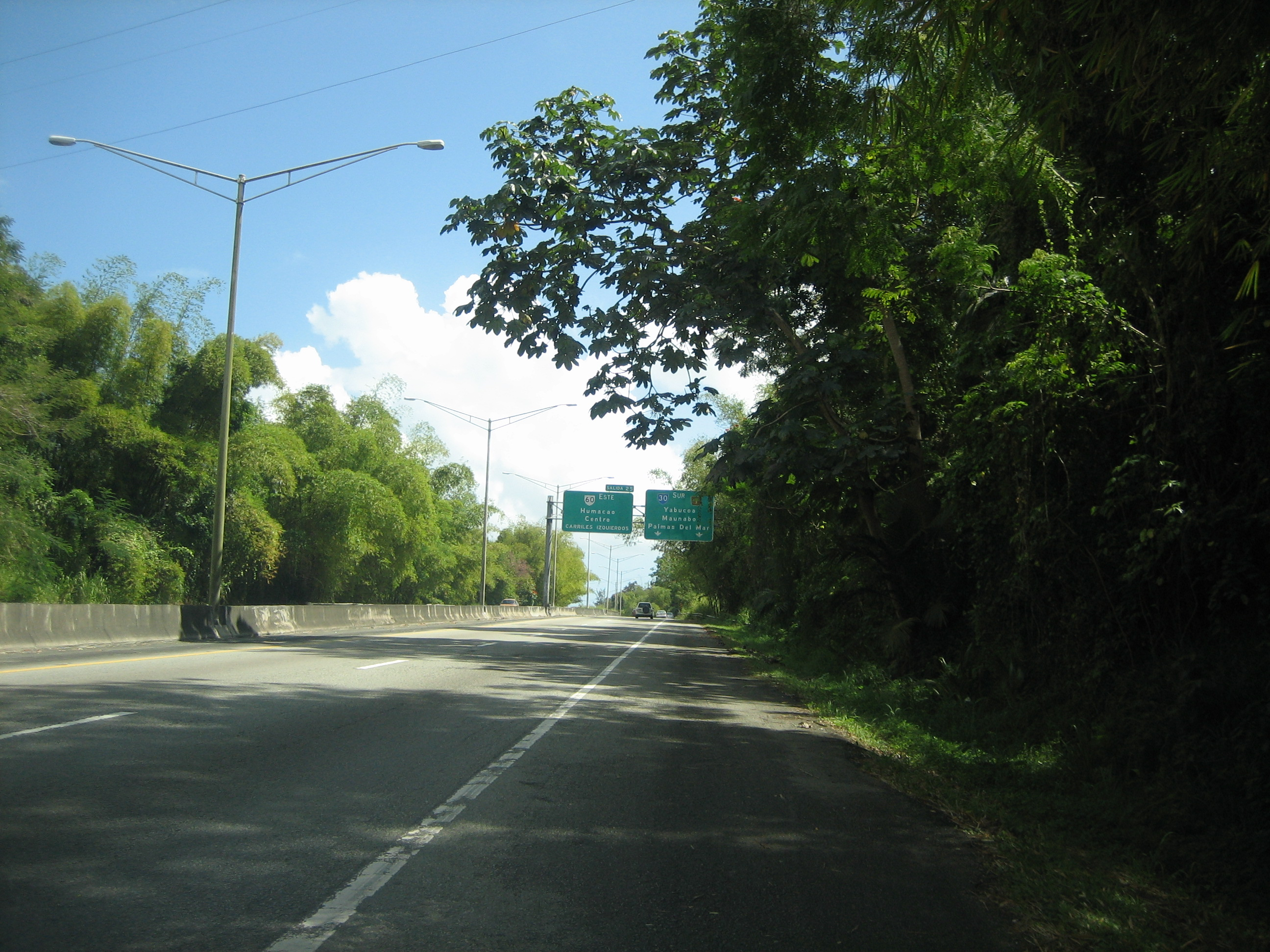
PR-30 east approaching PR-60 east in Humacao

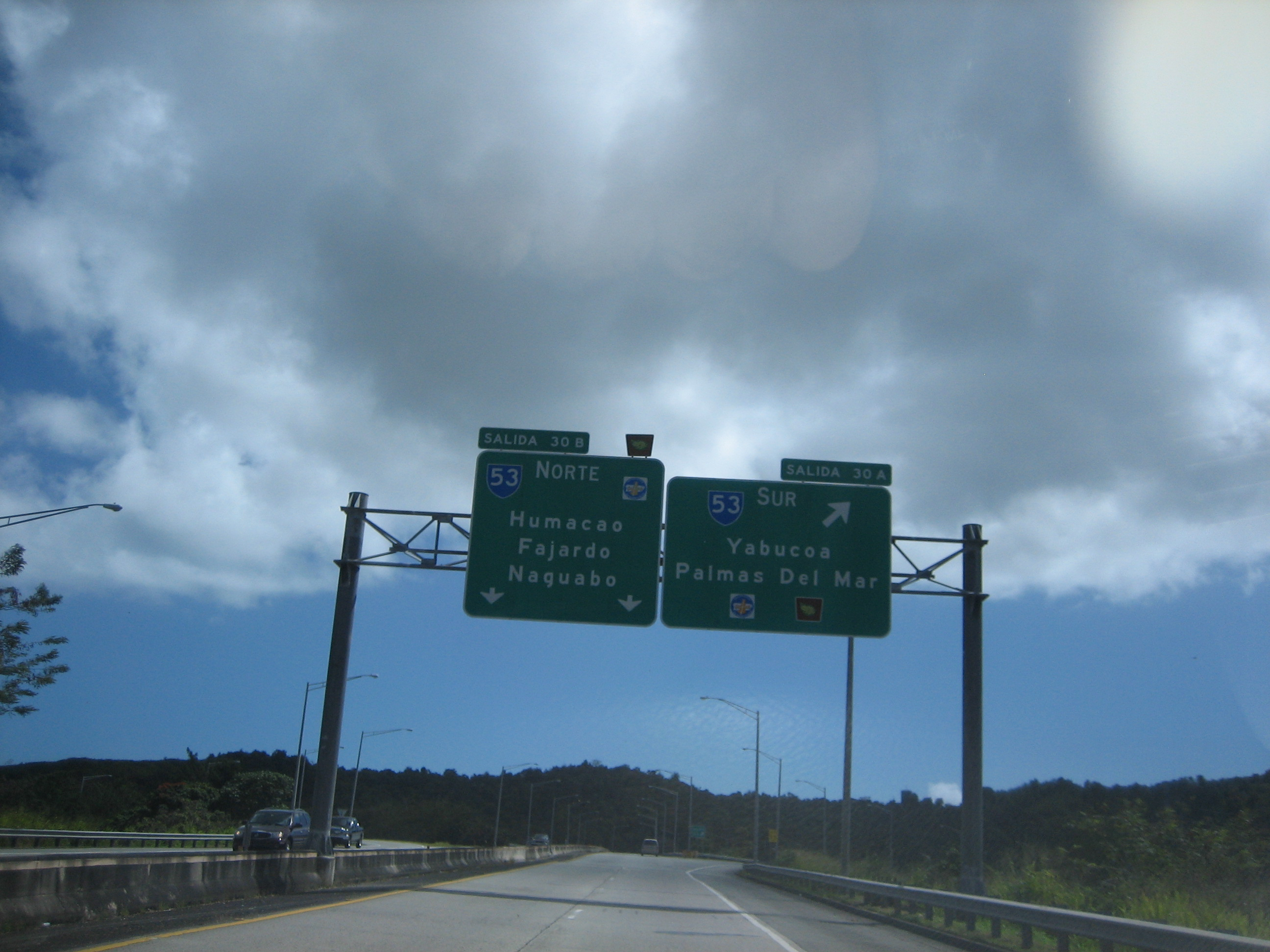
PR-30 east at PR-53 interchange in Humacao

Municipality	Location	km	mi	Exit	Destinations	Notes
Caguas	Bairoa	0.0	0.0	0A–B	PR-1 / PR-52 (PRI-1 / Autopista Luis A. Ferré) – San Juan, Caguas, Ponce, Cayey, Bayamón, Carolina	Western terminus of PR-30. Access to Menonita Caguas Regional Hospital
Caguas	Bairoa	2.9– 3.0	1.8– 1.9	3	PR-Avenida Rafael Cordero – Caguas Centro	The first exit, which connect PR-30 to its parallel route PR-189. This exits grants access to Plaza Centro, the second most important shopping center in Caguas.
Gurabo	Rincón	4.0– 4.1	2.5– 2.5	4	PR-189 – Caguas, Gurabo	Grants access to Ana G. Méndez University and West Gurabo.
Gurabo	Rincón	5.5– 5.6	3.4– 3.5	5	PR-203 south (Expreso Chayanne) – San Lorenzo	Connects PR-30 with PR-183.
Gurabo	Rincón–Mamey– Jaguar tripoint	7.5– 7.9	4.7– 4.9	7–8	PR-181 / PR-9944 (Desvío Oscar Dávila Carrión) – Gurabo, Trujillo Alto, Jaguar	Access to the main downtown of Gurabo, south to Jaguar barrio in San Lorenzo and further north to Trujillo Alto.
Gurabo	Mamey	9.0– 9.1	5.6– 5.7	9	PR-189 / PR-9030 – Gurabo	No westbound exit; eastbound entrance ramp closed.
Juncos	Mamey	13.1	8.1	12	PR-185 north to PR-189 – Juncos, Canóvanas	Eastbound exit and westbound entrance. Connects PR-30 with PR-66 and PR-3.
Juncos	Juncos barrio-pueblo	13.6	8.5	13	PR-189 / PR-9919 (Desvío Ingeniero Josué Díaz Díaz) to PR-952 – Juncos Centro, Canóvanas, Canta Gallo	Access to downtown Juncos and Lirios barrio.
Juncos	Ceiba Norte	14.6– 14.7	9.1– 9.1	14	PR-31 east / PR-189 – Juncos, Ceiba	
Las Piedras	Ceiba–Montones line	20.2	12.6	19	PR-204 – Valenciano Abajo, Ceiba	Exit to Valenciano area of Las Piedras. A small shopping center with a movie theatre, the largest in the southeast is there.
Las Piedras	Montones–Tejas line	21.9	13.6	21	PR-183 – Las Piedras, Montones	Access to downtown Las Piedras, and the Montones barrio.
Las Piedras	Tejas	23.0	14.3	22	PR-921 – Tejas	Access to East Las Piedras and the Tejas barrio
Humacao	Tejas	26.1	16.2	25	PR-60 east (Avenida Dionisio Casillas) to PR-198 – Humacao Centro	Access to Center Humacao and North Humacao.
Humacao	Tejas	27.7	17.2	26–28B	PR-908 – Humacao Oeste, Tejas	Access to the University of Puerto Rico at Humacao and the Patagonia area.
Humacao	Cataño	28.5	17.7	28A	PR-909 – Humacao Sur, Mariana	Access to the Mariana barrio. For traffic from PR-30 Eastbound to PR-909 must take exit 28.
Humacao	Cataño	29.1	18.1	28	PR-3 – Humacao Sur, Mariana, Cataño	Eastbound exit only; no re-entry. Access to Candelero Arriba, Palmas del Mar and South Humacao. This exit can be used to bypass the Humacao South Toll Plaza on PR-53.
Humacao	Buena Vista	30.1	18.7	30A–B	PR-53 (Autopista Doctor José Celso Barbosa) – Humacao, Fajardo, Yabucoa, Palmas del Mar	Eastern terminus of PR-30. To the south (Exit 30A) is Yabucoa and going north (Exit 30B) is Fajardo, 30 kilometers from Humacao. PR-53 exit 33.
1.000 mi = 1.609 km; 1.000 km = 0.621 mi: Incomplete access
