= Marianus =

Marianus is a male name, formerly an ancient Roman family name, derived from Marius. Marianus may refer to:

- Marianus of Auxerre (died 462 or 473), French monk and saint
- Marianus Scotus of Mainz (1028–1082 or 83), otherwise Máel Brigte (Devotee of St. Brigid), Irish monk and chronicler
- Marianus Scotus of Regensburg (died circa 1088), Irish monk, abbot of St. Peter's at Regensburg
- Marianus II of Cagliari (died 1130), also known as Torchitorio II, Judge of Cagliari from c. 1102 to his death
- Marianus of Florence (died 1523), Friar Minor, historian, and chronicler of the Franciscan Order
- Marianus Brockie (1687–1755), Benedictine monk

Marianus of Arborea

- Marianus I of Arborea (died 1070), the Judge of Arborea from 1060 to his death
- Marianus II of Arborea (died 1297), the Judge of Arborea from 1241 to his death
- Marianus III of Arborea (died 1321), the sole Judge of Arborea from 1308 to his death
- Marianus IV of Arborea (1329–1376), the Judge of Arborea from 1347 to his death
- Marianus V of Arborea (1378–1407), the Judge of Arborea from 1387 until his death

Marianus of Torres

- Marianus I of Torres (died 1082?), the Judge of Logudoro from 1073 until c. 1082
- Marianus II of Torres (died 1233), the Judge of Logudoro from 1218 until his death

== See also ==
- Codex Marianus, Glagolitic fourfold Gospel Book that is one of the oldest manuscript witnesses to the Old Church Slavonic language
- Doctor Marianus disambiguation page
- Mariana (disambiguation)
- Mariani (disambiguation)
- Mariano
- Marianum
- Marinus disambiguation page
- Merianus
