= Marianna =

Marianna may refer to:

- Marianna, Arkansas, USA
- Marianna, Florida, USA
- Marianna, Pennsylvania, USA
- An English spelling for Mariana, Minas Gerais, Brazil
- 602 Marianna, an asteroid, number 602 in the minor planet catalog
- Marianna (given name), with a list of people of this name
- "Marianna" (song), a 1962 song by Johnny Mathis

== See also ==
- Mariana (disambiguation)
- Marianne (disambiguation)
- Maria Anna (disambiguation)
- Mariano (disambiguation)
- Marian (disambiguation)
