= Mariana =

Mariana is a given name (the link includes a list of people of this name).

Mariana may also refer to:

== Literature ==
- Mariana (Dickens novel), a 1940 novel by Monica Dickens
- Mariana (poem), a poem by Alfred Tennyson, 1st Baron Tennyson
- Mariana (Vaz novel), a 1997 novel by Katherine Vaz

== Music ==
- "Mariana", a song by Alberto Cortez
- "Mariana", a song by Collectif Métissé
- "Mariana", a song by Gibson Brothers

== Places ==
- Mariana, Minas Gerais, Brazil
  - Roman Catholic Archdiocese of Mariana
- Mariana Lake, Alberta, Canada
- Mariana, Corsica
  - Roman Catholic Diocese of Mariana in Corsica
- Mariana, Humacao, Puerto Rico, a barrio
- Mariana, Naguabo, Puerto Rico, a barrio
- Mariana, Cuenca, a municipality in the province of Cuenca, Spain
- Mariana, a Roman town in Hispania, currently named Puebla del Príncipe, in Ciudad Real, Spain
- Mariana, village in Banyuasin Regency, South Sumatra, Indonesia
- Mariana, village in Pontianak, West Kalimantan, Indonesia
- Mariana, Quezon City, a barangay in Metro Manila, the Philippines; better known as New Manila
- Mariana Islands, a group of islands in the north-western Pacific Ocean
- Mariana Trench, the deepest trench in the world's oceans
- Terra Mariana, alternative name (sobriquet) of modern Estonia, a medieval Holy Roman Empire principality in Estonia and Latvia

== TV and painting ==
- Mariana (1968 TV series), a Mexican telenovela
- Mariana (1970 TV series), a Mexican telenovela
- Mariana (Millais), an 1851 painting by John Everett Millais

== Zoology ==
- Mariana, a synonym for Marianina, a genus of nudibranches
- Mariana, a synonym for Silybum, a genus of plants

== See also ==
- Ana Maria
- Anna Maria (disambiguation)
- Great Marianas Turkey Shoot, more formally, The Battle of the Philippine Sea (June 19–20, 1944), a major naval battle of World War II
- Pocito Department#The Legend of India Mariana, a legend of Argentina
- Marian (disambiguation)
- Mariana de la Noche, a 2003 Mexican telenovela
- Mariana Mantovana, a commune in the Province of Mantua in the Italian region of Lombardy
- Mariana Pineda, a play by Federico García Lorca
- Mariana UFO Incident, which occurred in 1950 in Montana, United States
- Marianas Trench (band), based in Vancouver, British Columbia, Canada
- Marianna (disambiguation)
- Mariano
- Marina (disambiguation)
- Order of the Cross of Terra Mariana
