= Raúl del Pozo =

Spanish journalist (1936–2026)

Raúl del Pozo Page (25 December 1936 – 10 March 2026) was a Spanish journalist and writer.

== Life and career ==
Raúl del Pozo Page was born in Mariana on 25 December 1936. He began his journalistic career in 1960, in the Diario de Cuenca, before working with the newspaper Pueblo. In the 1970s, he also worked in Mundo Obrero and in the 1980s in Interviú. It was during that decade that he received the Pedro Rodríguez Journalism Award and the Francisco Cerecedo Journalism Award.

In addition to being a parliamentary chronicler and current affairs analyst, both on radio and television, such as in the programs of María Teresa Campos Día a día (1996–2004) and Cada día (2004–2005), since 1991 he was a columnist for the newspaper El Mundo, where, in 2007, he took the baton of the late Francisco Umbral in the column El ruido de la calle. In 1991, he opposed the Persian Gulf War, joining the Collective Periodistas por la Paz, which publishes Diario por la Paz, while he stood out as a novelist and writer.

In 2005, he won the González-Ruano Prize for journalism and, three years later, his career was recognized with the Mariano de Cavia Prize, which is awarded annually by the Diario ABC. In 2009, he received the ABC Cultural & Cultural Area Award, from its directors Fernando Rodríguez Lafuente and Ramón Pernas and the Gold Medal of Castilla-La Mancha in 2017. He declared himself an atheist, by qualifying the Bible as a book of fantastic literature, in addition to considering it bad literature.

In 2020, his biography was published, written by journalists Jesús Úbeda and Julio Valdeón, titled Don't give more whiskey to the dog, in novelized format and with a prologue by Carlos Alsina.

Del Pozo died on 10 March 2026, at the age of 89.
