= Mariano (surname) =

Mariano is an Italian surname. Notable people with the surname include:

- Belle Mariano, a Filipino actress, singer, and model
- Gabriel Mariano (1928–2002), a Cape Verdean poet, novelist, and essayist
- Rob Mariano, an American television personality

== See also ==
- Mariano
- Mariano (disambiguation)
