= Mariano (disambiguation) =

Mariano, a masculine name from the Romance languages

Mariano may also refer to:

- Mariano (footballer, born 1951), Mariano Noé Schmitz, Brazilian football right back
- Mariano (footballer, born 1975), a former Portuguese football player
- Mariano (footballer, born 1986), a Brazilian professional footballer
- Mariano (surname), an Italian surname
- Mariano Comense, town and comune in the province of Como, Lombardy, Italy
