= Maryanne =

Maryanne is a given name. Notable people with the name include:

- Maryanne Amacher (1938–2009), American composer and installation artist
- Maryanne Connelly (born 1945), Democratic politician in New Jersey and the former mayor of Fanwood
- Maryanne Demasi, Australian science reporter and presenter with ABC's Catalyst
- Maryanne Ellison Simmons (born 1949), American artist and writer, and the wife of baseball player Ted Simmons
- Maryanne J. George, American Christian musician
- MaryAnne Golon, American journalist and magazine photography editor
- Maryanne Keller, Colorado State Senator
- Maryanne Kusaka, American politician and former Mayor of the County of Kaua'i
- Maryanne Lewis, American businesswoman and former Massachusetts State Representative
- Maryanne Petrilla, currently the Luzerne County Commissioner Chairperson
- MaryAnne Tebedo (born 1936), Colorado State Senator from Colorado Springs
- Maryanne Tipler, New Zealand mathematics textbook author
- Maryanne Trump Barry (born 1937), judge on the United States Court of Appeals for the Third Circuit and older sister of President Donald Trump
- Maryanne Vollers, American author, journalist and ghostwriter
- Maryanne Wolf, American educator and author who studies the origins of reading and language-learning
- Maryanne Zéhil, filmmaker and a producer from Beirut

== See also ==
- Marianne (given name)
- Mary Ann (disambiguation), includes a list of people with given name Mary Ann
