= MaryAnne Tebedo =

American politician

MaryAnne Geivett Tebedo

Member of the Colorado Senate from the 12th district
- In office January 11, 1989 – January 10, 2001
- Preceded by: Harold L. (Mack) McCormick
- Succeeded by: Andy McElhany

Member of the Colorado House of Representatives from the 16th district
- In office January 25, 1982 – January 11, 1989
- Preceded by: William H. Becker
- Succeeded by: Bill Martin

Personal details
- Born: MaryAnne Geivett; October 30, 1936 Denver
- Died: February 13, 2023 (aged 86) Colorado Springs, Colorado
- Party: Republican
- Spouse: Donald E. Tebedo
- Children: Six
- Profession: Professional Registered Parliamentarian

MaryAnne Geivett Tebedo (October 30, 1936 – February 13, 2023) was an American politician from Colorado Springs, Colorado, U.S. She served in both the Colorado House of Representatives and the Colorado State Senate.

From 1982 through 1989, Tebedo served as a Republican in the Colorado House of Representatives. In 1988, she was elected to the Colorado State Senate where she served two four-year terms, leaving office on January 10, 2001. Tebedo chaired two Senate committees, the Local Government Committee and the State, Military and Veterans Affairs Committee and served on eight legislative committees. Legislation she sponsored dealt with early education through college, transportation, energy and mining, local government affairs, National Guard, state finance, constitution and elections, large and small business and labor affairs, and the environment.

Colorado Springs Gazette columnist Ralph Routon wrote a series of columns supporting the idea of placing all of Colorado on year-round daylight saving time in order to save state residents the "aggravation of resetting their clocks every six months." Routon mentions in his original column several other beneficial effects, at least to himself. The idea gathered noticeable popular support within Colorado Springs, and attention of the state's larger newspapers, said attention being negative, as Ed Quillen savaged the plan in an opinion piece, but when MaryAnne Tebedo attempted to present the idea to the state legislature, her research uncovered federal laws forbidding the state-initiated extension of daylight saving time. Still determined to relieve Coloradans of the need to change their clocks, Tebedo introduced the only bill legally permitted to her: a proposal to exempt the state of Colorado from DST. The bill failed to escape committee during the 2000 legislative session.

MaryAnne is the mother of Kevin Tebedo, a former Executive Director of the organization Colorado for Family Values.
