= Colorado for Family Values =

Defunct American socially conservative advocacy group

Logo of Colorado for Family Values.

Colorado for Family Values was a socially conservative advocacy group in Colorado, United States. It existed from 1990 to 2002.

== Overview ==
It was co-founded by Tony Marco, Kevin Tebedo and David Noebel in the early 1990s. Will Perkins, a former car dealer from Colorado Springs, was the chairman of the board. Originally, it was called the Colorado Coalition for Family Values, but they dropped the word 'coalition' after a radio presenter said it sounded Marxist. Some have argued, because of the proximity of timing for the moving of Focus on the Family to Colorado Springs, that James Dobson's move to Colorado Springs in 1991 led to its establishment. Dobson's Focus on the Family is officially independent from Colorado for Family Values. It has also been linked to Traditional Values, Summit Ministries, Concerned Women for America, and the Eagle Forum. Bill McCartney, the founder of Promise Keepers, is a supporter.

Colorado for Family Values was created specifically for the purpose of countering an objective of the Colorado Human Relations Commission, to introduce legislation that would effectively add the behavior of homosexuality to the list of protected class status, thus creating the legal process of strict scrutiny for claims of discrimination made by homosexual individuals. It drafted and promoted Amendment 2 in 1992, which led to the United States Supreme Court case Romer v. Evans.

== Dissolution ==
Colorado for Family Values was dissolved in 2002 according to the records of the Colorado Secretary of State.
