= Marianne Beuchert =

German florist gardener and writer

Marianne Beuchert (29 May 1924 in Frankfurt-Sachsenhausen – 9 February 2007 in Frankfurt am Main) was a Frankfurt florist, gardener and writer.

She is mainly noted for her work on Chinese Garden Art. Her publications include Die Gärten Chinas (1998), Symbolik der Pflanzen (1995) and Gärten am Reiseweg − Von Irland bis Portugal (1997). the latter were listed amongst the top five gardening books by the German Horticultural Society (Deutsche Gartenbau-Gesellschaft). She was a frequent contributor to the Frankfurter Allgemeine Zeitung.

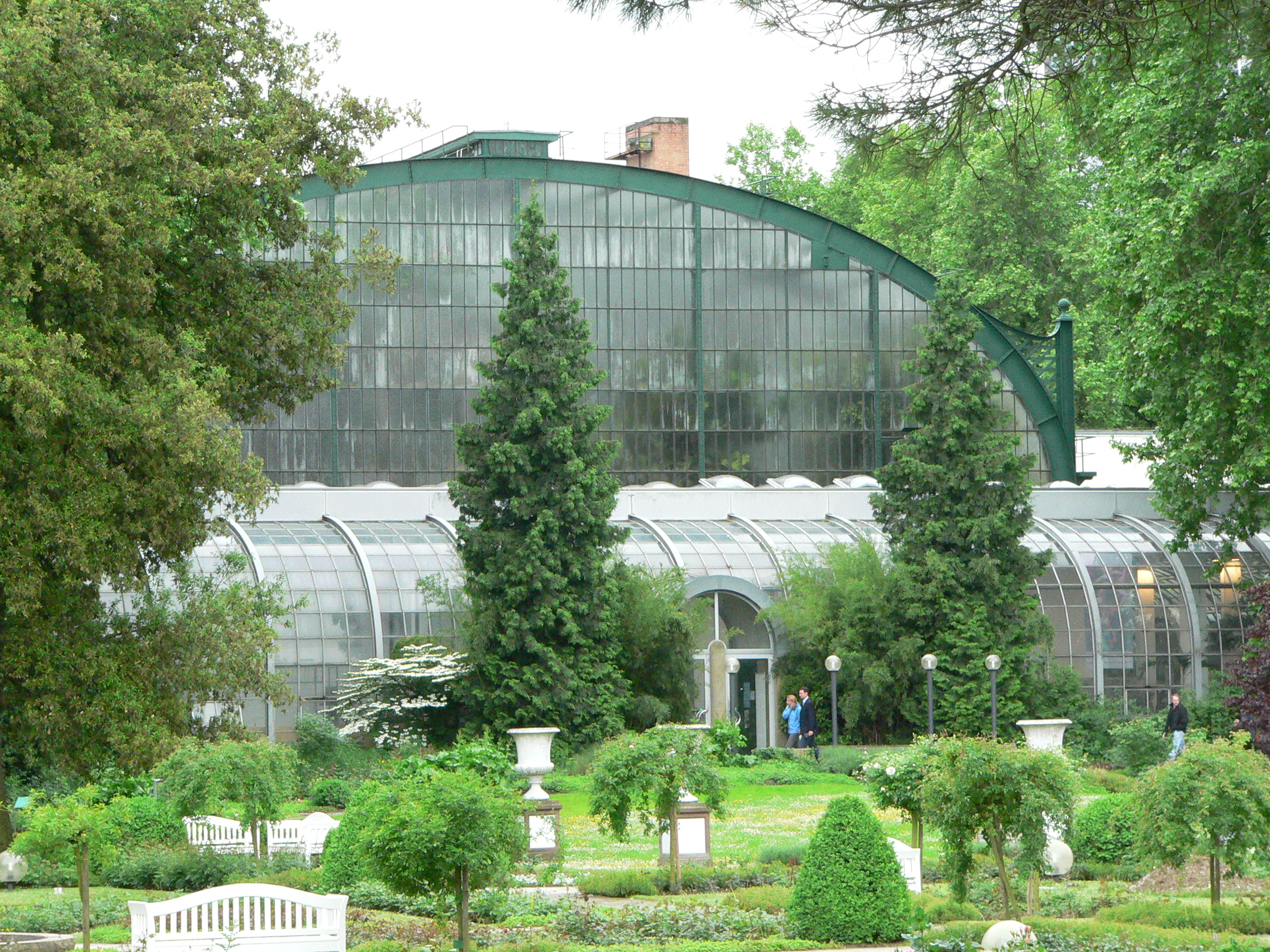
Palmengarten, Frankfurt

She ran a plant store in Frankfurt called Blumen-Beuchert on the Rathenauplatz, and was active in the work of the Palmengarten, where she served as a member of the Board of Trustees (Mitglied des Kuratoriums für den Erhalt des historischen Palmenhauses).

When she died in 2007 she bequeathed her estate in Preungesheim with its collection of plants, to the Palmengarten, however it has since been destroyed for housing.
