= Marianne Alissan de la Tour =

French author and contemporary of Jean-Jacques Rousseau (1730–1789)

Marianne de la Tour
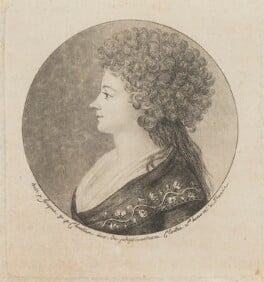
- Portrait de Marianne Alissan de la Tour
- Born: 1730; Paris, France
- Died: 7 September 1789 (aged 58–59); Saint-Mandé, France
- Known for: Correspondences with the Jean-Jacques Rousseau

Marianne Alissan de la Tour (1730 – 7 September 1789) was a French writer and became known for her correspondence with the philosopher Jean-Jacques Rousseau.

== Biography ==
De la Tour was born in Paris, the daughter of Jean Baptiste Merlet de Foussomme. She married Alexandre Jean-Baptiste Alissan de La Tour (b. 1727), but the marriage was unhappy and they separated.

She is mostly known for exchanging letters with Rousseau. She was an admirer of his works and they wrote to each other from 1761 to 1776.

Her letters contain many figures borrowed from the previous century, but also many from La Nouvelle Héloïse, in view of a usage that had been in the process of being codified only a few decades earlier. Mme de la Tour, a model correspondent, ‘good student’ and assiduous reader of Rousseau, is an example of those unknown ladies who helped to establish the form of letter-writing correspondence by drawing inspiration from literature, illustrating Habermas's theory that in the mid-eighteenth century the spheres of the public and the private were mutually fertile.

Marianne Alissan de la Tour died in Saint-Mandé, France, on 7 September 1789.

== Selected works ==
She was author of Précis pour M. J.J. Rousseau, en réponse a l'Exposé succinct de M. Hume (1767) and Jean Jaques Rousseau vangé par son amie, ou Morale pratico-philosophico-encyclopédique des Coryphées de la secte (1779).
