= Marianna Kambouroglou =

Greek folklorist

Marianna Kambourlogou
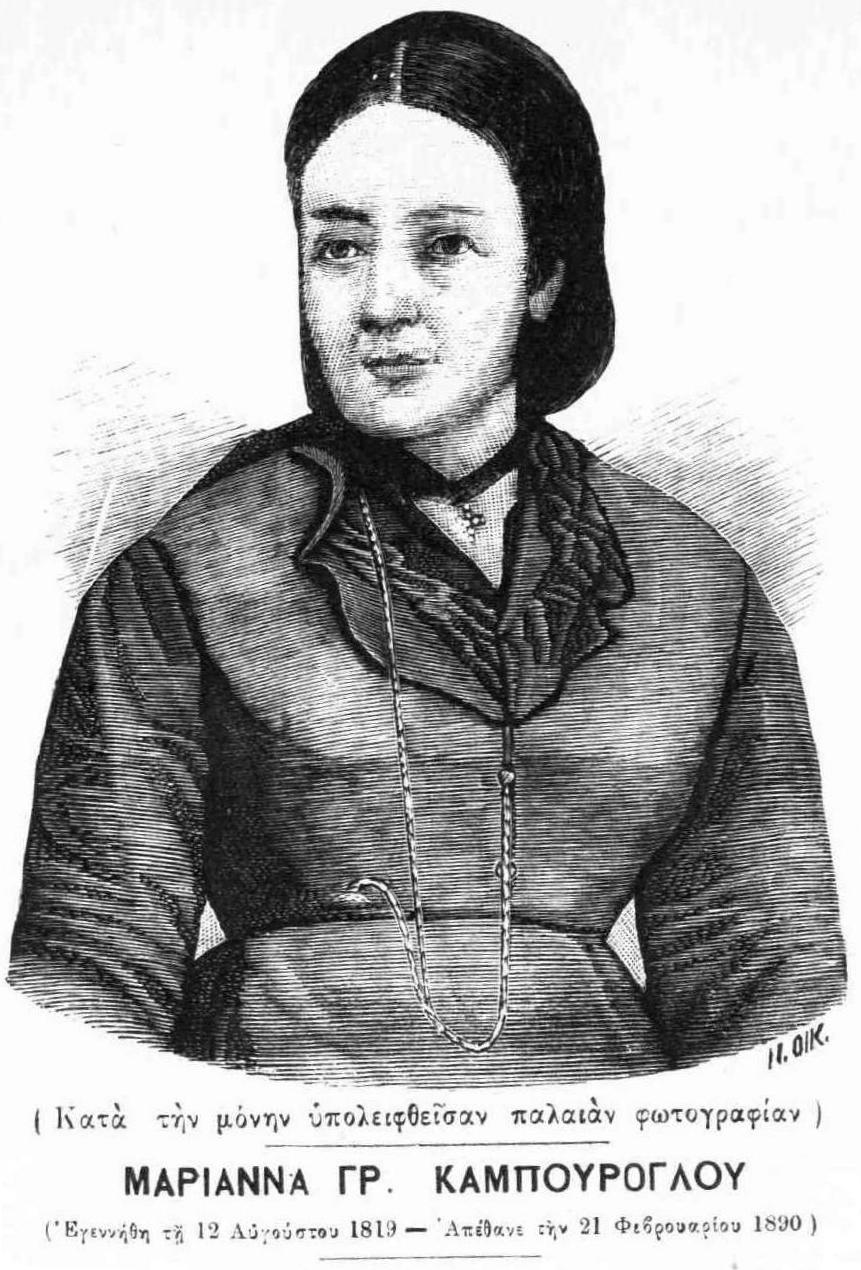
- Marianna Kambourlogou, illustration based on the sole remaining photograph
- Born: 1819
- Died: 1890 (aged 70–71)
- Writing career
- Language: Greek
- Genre: Greek folklore

Marianna Sotirianos Kambouroglou (1819–1890), was a Greek folklorist.

== Life ==
She was born August 12, 1819, in Athens.

Mariana Kambouroglou preserved the history of earlier eras and conserved their traditions, which doubtless would have been lost without her efforts. She was one of the more active representatives of the old Athenian life and of its families.

She wrote many notable monographs concerning Athens, and concerning historical and topographical questions. They were notable for their uncommonly descriptive prose and their reasoning.

She died in Athens on 21 February, 1890.

== Publications ==
She published many ethnographic articles in periodicals of the era, in Byro, Bulletin of the Ethnological and Historical Society of Greece, and Weekly, among others.

== Sources ==
- Yoannis Arsenis, Michael Raphaelovitz, ed. (1891). Ποικίλη Στοά: Εθνική εικονογραφημένη επετηρίς [Political Forum: National Iconography Yearbook] (in Greek). Athens: Estia.
- Sklaventis, Triandafilos (ed.). "Marianna Kambouroglou". Pandektis: Modern Greek Visual Prosopography.
