= Mabú =

Barrio of Humacao, Puerto Rico

- Barrio
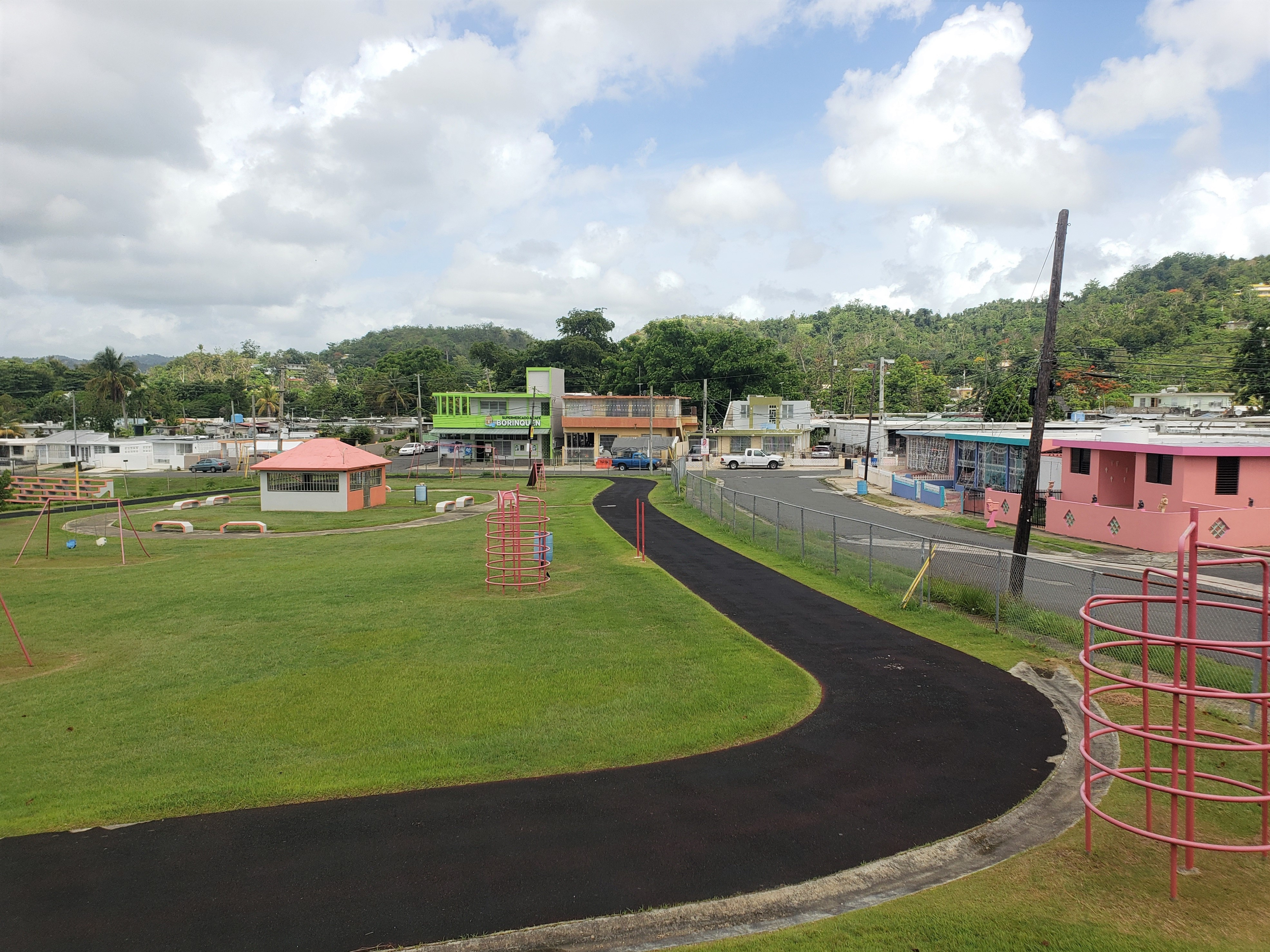
- Park in Urbanización Los Rosales in Mabú

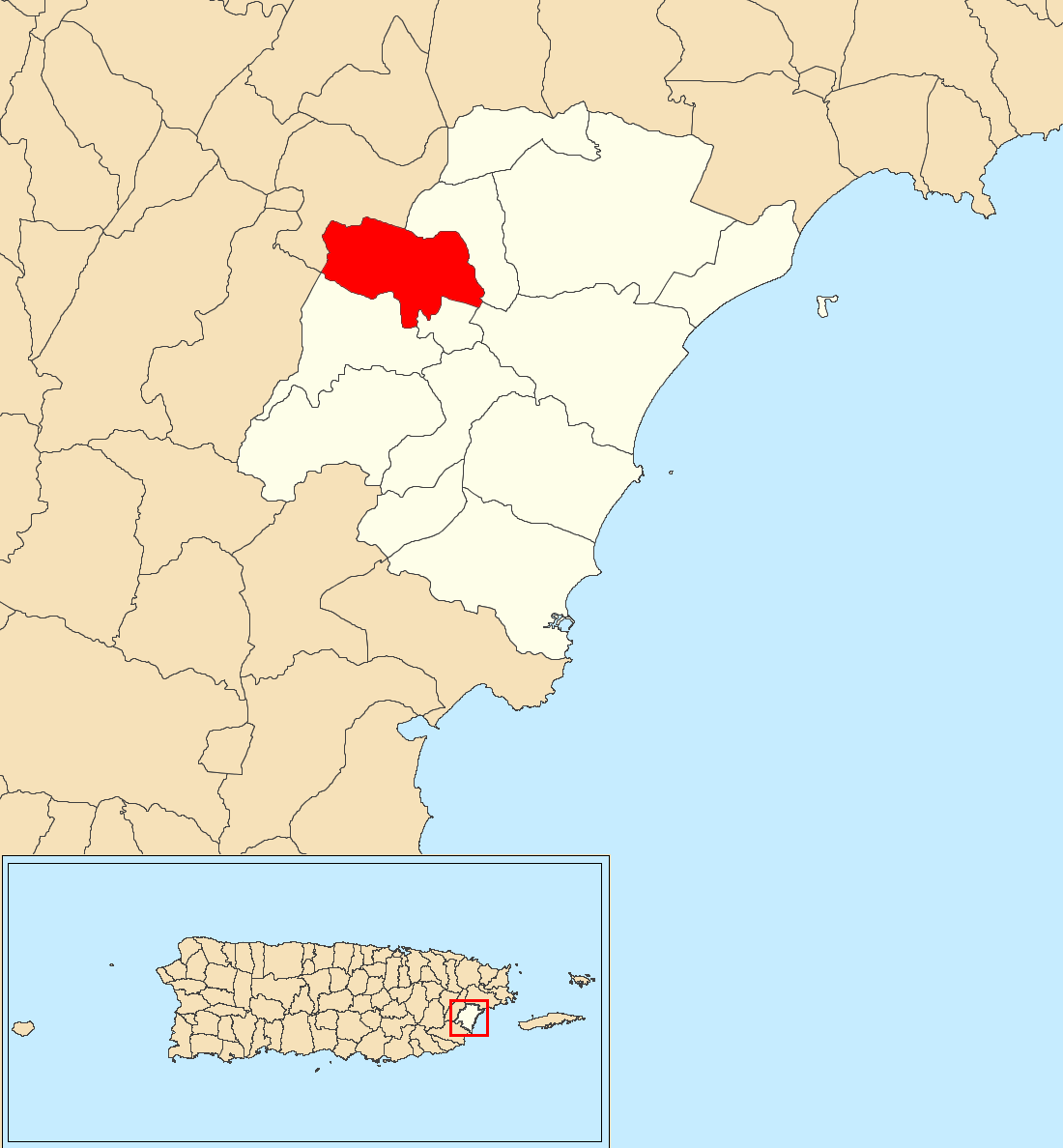
- Location of Mabú within the municipality of Humacao shown in red

- Location of Puerto Rico
- Coordinates: 18°09′51″N 65°50′17″W
- Commonwealth: Puerto Rico
- Municipality: Humacao

Area
  - Total: 2.93 sq mi (7.6 km^{2})
  - Land: 2.93 sq mi (7.6 km^{2})
  - Water: 0 sq mi (0 km^{2})
- Elevation: 410 ft (120 m)

Population (2010)
  - Total: 8,045
  - Density: 2,745.7/sq mi (1,060.1/km^{2})
- Source: 2010 Census
- Time zone: UTC−4 (AST)
- ZIP Code: 00791

Mabú is a barrio in the municipality of Humacao, Puerto Rico. Its population in 2010 was 8,045.

== History ==
Mabú was in Spain's gazetteers until Puerto Rico was ceded by Spain in the aftermath of the Spanish–American War under the terms of the Treaty of Paris of 1898 and became an unincorporated territory of the United States. In 1899, the United States Department of War conducted a census of Puerto Rico finding that the combined population of Cataño and Mabú barrio was 1,179.

Historical population
Census	Pop.	Note	%±
1910	971		—
1920	1,129		16.3%
1930	1,529		35.4%
1940	3,788		147.7%
1950	4,702		24.1%
1960	4,464		−5.1%
1970	0		−100.0%
1980	6,060		—
1990	8,013		32.2%
2000	8,526		6.4%
2010	8,045		−5.6%
U.S. Decennial Census; 1900 (N/A) 1910-1930; 1930-1950 1980-2000 2010

== Gallery ==
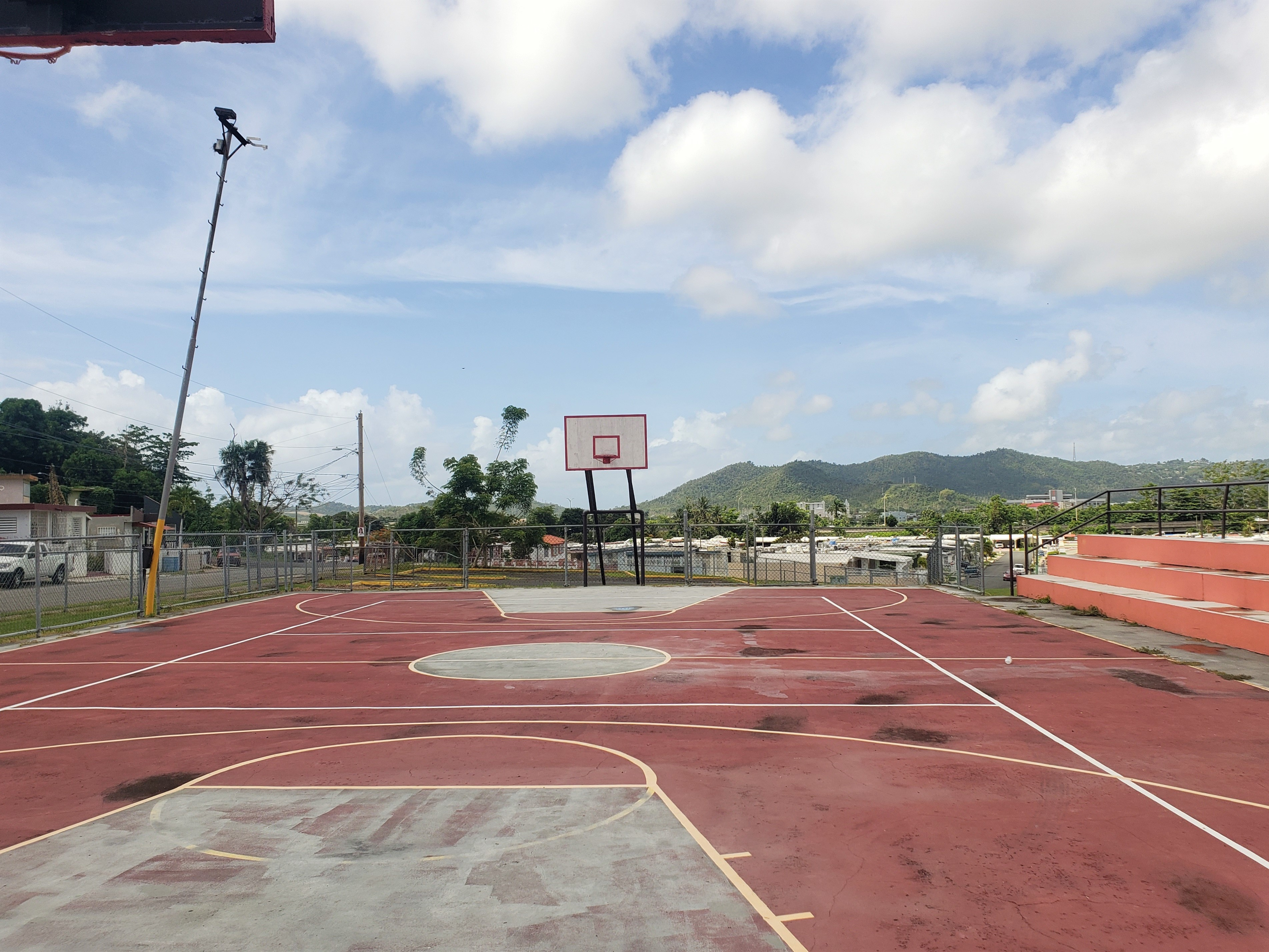
Court for Streetball in Puerto Rico in Los Rosales, a neighborhood of Mabú

== See also ==
- List of communities in Puerto Rico
