= Cataño, Humacao, Puerto Rico =

Barrio of Puerto Rico

Cataño
- Barrio
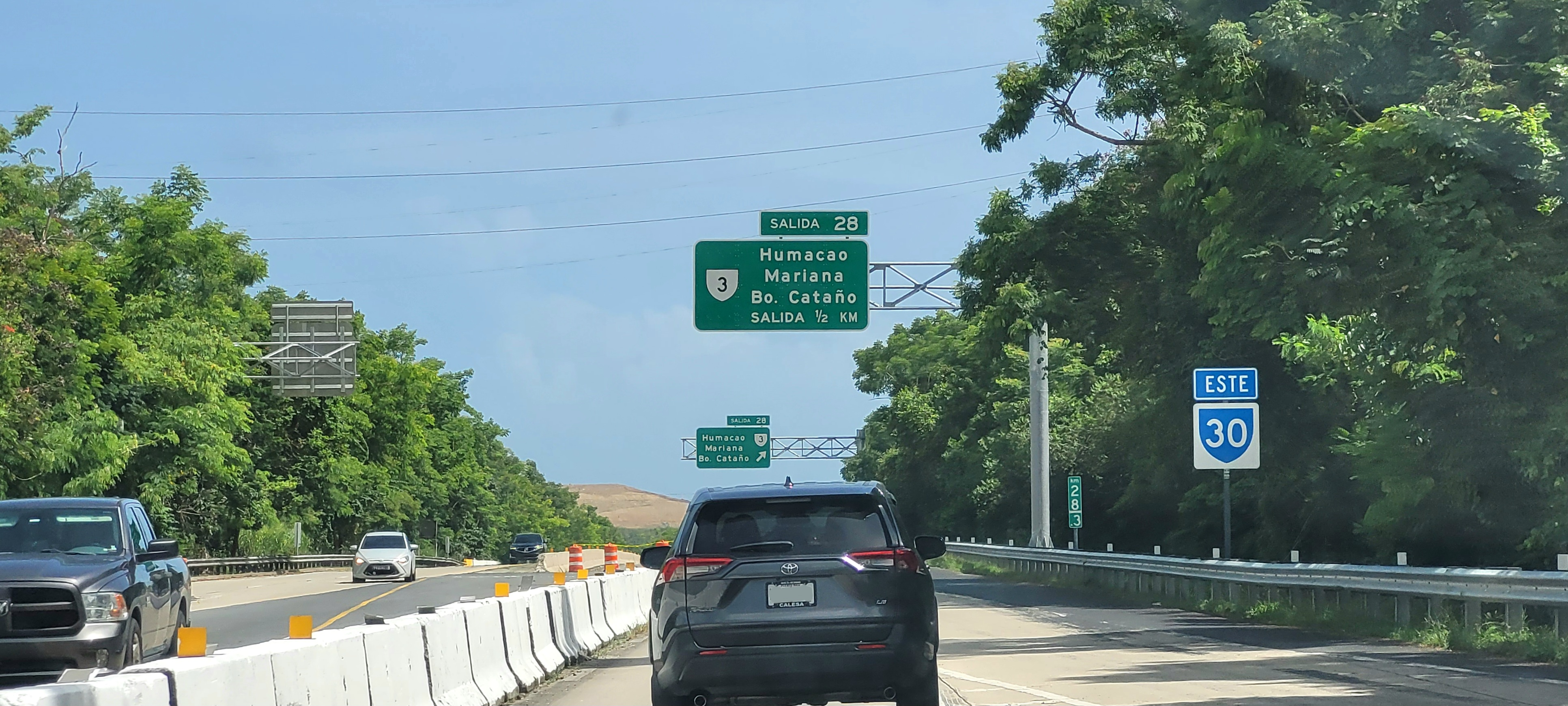
- Puerto Rico Highway 30 in Cataño

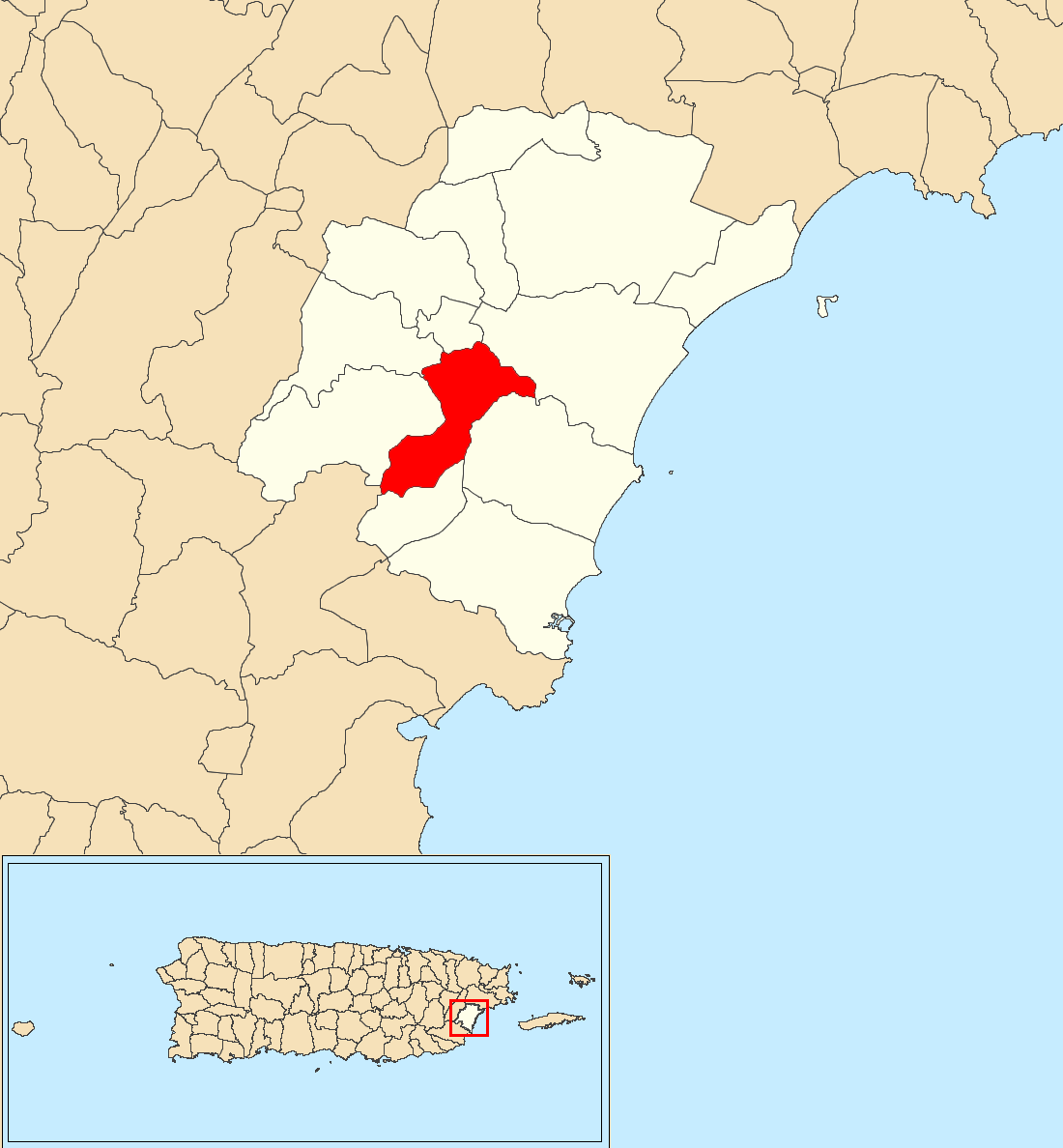
- Location of Cataño within the municipality of Humacao shown in red

- Location of Puerto Rico
- Coordinates: 18°07′22″N 65°49′53″W
- Commonwealth: Puerto Rico
- Municipality: Humacao

Area
  - Total: 2.51 sq mi (6.5 km^{2})
  - Land: 2.44 sq mi (6.3 km^{2})
  - Water: 0.07 sq mi (0.18 km^{2})
- Elevation: 253 ft (77 m)

Population (2010)
  - Total: 3,387
  - Density: 1,393.8/sq mi (538.1/km^{2})
- Source: 2010 Census
- Time zone: UTC−4 (AST)
- ZIP Code: 00791

Cataño is a barrio in the municipality of Humacao, Puerto Rico. Its population in 2010 was 3,387.

== History ==
Cataño was in Spain's gazetteers until Puerto Rico was ceded by Spain in the aftermath of the Spanish–American War under the terms of the Treaty of Paris of 1898 and became an unincorporated territory of the United States. In 1899, the United States Department of War conducted a census of Puerto Rico finding that the combined population of Cataño and Mabú barrio was 1,179.

Historical population
Census	Pop.	Note	%±
1910	529		—
1920	665		25.7%
1930	964		45.0%
1940	1,568		62.7%
1950	1,310		−16.5%
1960	2,365		80.5%
1970	0		−100.0%
1980	1,865		—
1990	1,971		5.7%
2000	2,508		27.2%
2010	3,387		35.0%
U.S. Decennial Census; 1900 (N/A) 1910-1930; 1930-1950 1980-2000 2010

== See also ==
- List of communities in Puerto Rico
