= Jaguar, Gurabo, Puerto Rico =

Barrio of Puerto Rico

Jaguar
- Barrio
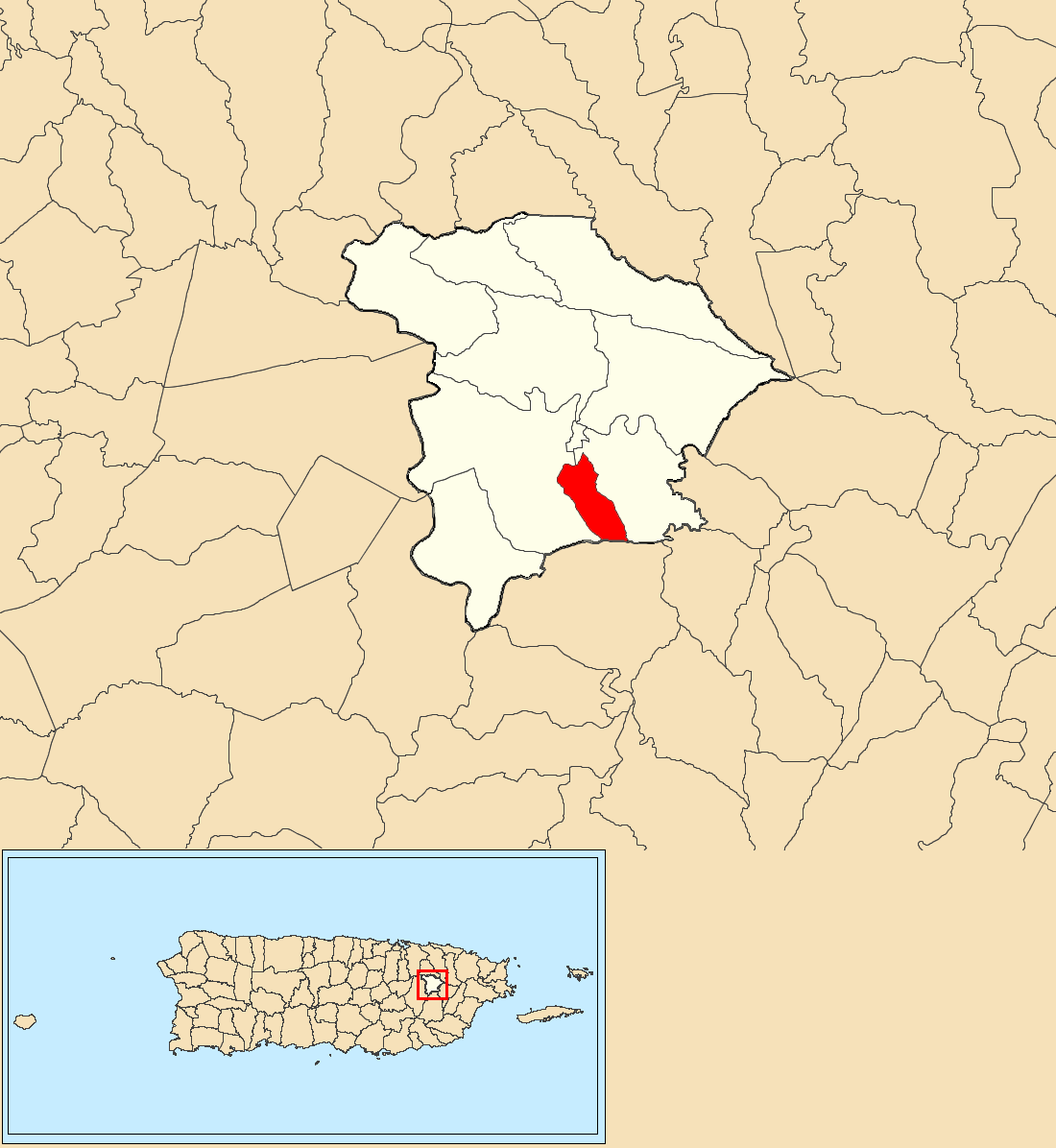
- Location of Jaguar within the municipality of Gurabo shown in red

- Location of Puerto Rico
- Coordinates: 18°14′35″N 65°58′13″W
- Commonwealth: Puerto Rico
- Municipality: Gurabo

Area
  - Total: 0.76 sq mi (2.0 km^{2})
  - Land: 0.76 sq mi (2.0 km^{2})
  - Water: 0 sq mi (0 km^{2})
- Elevation: 787 ft (240 m)

Population (2010)
  - Total: 735
  - Density: 967.1/sq mi (373.4/km^{2})
- Source: 2010 Census
- Time zone: UTC−4 (AST)
- ZIP Code: 00778

Jaguar is a barrio in the municipality of Gurabo, Puerto Rico. Its population in 2010 was 735.

== History ==
Jaguar was in Spain's gazetteers until Puerto Rico was ceded by Spain in the aftermath of the Spanish–American War under the terms of the Treaty of Paris of 1898 and became an unincorporated territory of the United States. In 1899, the United States Department of War conducted a census of Puerto Rico finding that the combined population of Jaguar and Masa barrios was 1,270.

Historical population
| Census | Pop. | Note | %± |
|---|---|---|---|
| 1910 | 416 | | — |
| 1920 | 455 | | 9.4% |
| 1930 | 637 | | 40.0% |
| 1940 | 794 | | 24.6% |
| 1950 | 659 | | −17.0% |
| 1960 | 730 | | 10.8% |
| 1970 | 0 | | −100.0% |
| 1980 | 708 | | — |
| 1990 | 739 | | 4.4% |
| 2000 | 810 | | 9.6% |
| 2010 | 735 | | −9.3% |
U.S. Decennial Census; 1900 (N/A) 1910-1930; 1930-1950 1980-2000 2010

== Sectors ==
Barrios (which are, in contemporary times, roughly comparable to minor civil divisions) in turn are further subdivided into smaller local populated place areas/units called sectores (sectors in English). The types of sectores may vary, from normally sector to urbanización to reparto to barriada to residencial, among others.

The following sectors are in Jaguar barrio:

Sector Aguayo, Sector Bezares, Sector Carrasquillo, Sector Los Benítez, Sector Los Fonseca, Sector Los García, Sector Los Núñez, Sector Maldonado, Sector Mariera, Sector Marina Rodríguez, Sector Ocasio, Sector Paquita Ramírez, Sector Pérez, and Sector Rufo Avilés.

== See also ==
- List of communities in Puerto Rico
- List of barrios and sectors of Gurabo, Puerto Rico
