= Mariana J. Kaplan =

Physician Scientist/ Rheumatologist

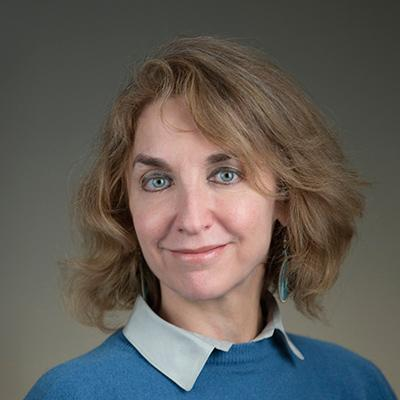
- Education: National Autonomous University of Mexico, University of Michigan
- Scientific career
- Fields: Rheumatology, immune dysregulation, systemic autoimmunity
- Workplaces: University of Michigan; National Institute of Arthritis and Musculoskeletal and Skin Diseases

Mariana J. Kaplan is a rheumatologist and physician-scientist. She researches mechanisms of immune dysregulation, organ damage, and premature vascular disease in systemic autoimmunity. Kaplan is chief of the systemic autoimmunity branch at the National Institute of Arthritis and Musculoskeletal and Skin Diseases.

== Life ==
Kaplan obtained her medical degree at the National Autonomous University of Mexico and did her internal medicine residency at the Salvador Zubirán National Institute of Health Sciences and Nutrition. She completed a rheumatology fellowship and postdoctoral training at the University of Michigan, where she was a member of the faculty for fifteen years and an active member of their multidisciplinary lupus clinic. She was a professor of medicine in the division of rheumatology at the University of Michigan.

In 2013, Kaplan joined the National Institute of Arthritis and Musculoskeletal and Skin Diseases (NIAMS) as chief of the systemic autoimmunity branch. She is also deputy scientific director. Kaplan's research has focused on identifying mechanisms of immune dysregulation, organ damage, and premature vascular disease in systemic autoimmunity. She investigates how innate immunity (in particular, type I interferons and myeloid cells) promote autoimmune responses and end-organ damage in systemic lupus erythematosus, rheumatoid arthritis, and other systemic autoimmune diseases.

Kaplan was inducted into the American Society for Clinical Investigation and the Association of American Physicians. In 2021, she was elected to the National Academy of Medicine for seminal contributions that have significantly advanced the understanding of the pathogenic role of the innate immune system in systemic autoimmune diseases, atherosclerosis, and immune-mediated vasculopathies. In December 2023, she was also awarded to NIH Distinguished Investigator, which only 2-3% of NIH investigators are honored with.
