= Marianus Brockie =

Scottish Benedictine monk

Marianus Brockie, D.D. (1687–1755) was a Scottish Benedictine monk.

== Life ==
He was born at Edinburgh on 2 December 1687, and joined the Scottish Benedictines at Ratisbon in 1708. He was doctor and professor of philosophy and divinity, and for a period superior of the Scotch monastery at Erfurt. In 1727 he was sent on the Catholic mission to Scotland, where he remained till 1739. After returning to Ratisbon, he was for many years prior of St. James's. He died on 2 December 1755.

== Works ==
He wrote Monasticon Scoticon, completed by Maurice Grant, which remained unpublished. The manuscript was preserved at St. Mary's College, Blairs; it was used by James Frederick Skinner Gordon in his Monasticum (1867).

Brockie wrote also 'Observationes critico-historicæ' on the 'Regulæ ac Statuta recentiorum Ordinum et Congregationum' which constitute the 3rd, 4th, 5th, and 6th volumes of Holstenius's 'Codex Regularum Monasticarum et Canonicarum,' printed at Augsburg in 1759.
