= Doctor Marianus =

Doctor Marianus may refer to:

- Anselm of Canterbury (c. 1033 – 1109), Benedictine monk, theologian, philosopher, Archbishop of Canterbury and Doctor of the Church
- Duns Scotus (c. 1265 – 1308), Blessed, Franciscan friar, theologian and philosopher, nicknamed Doctor Subtilis
