= Tejas, Humacao, Puerto Rico =

Barrio of Puerto Rico

Tejas
- Barrio
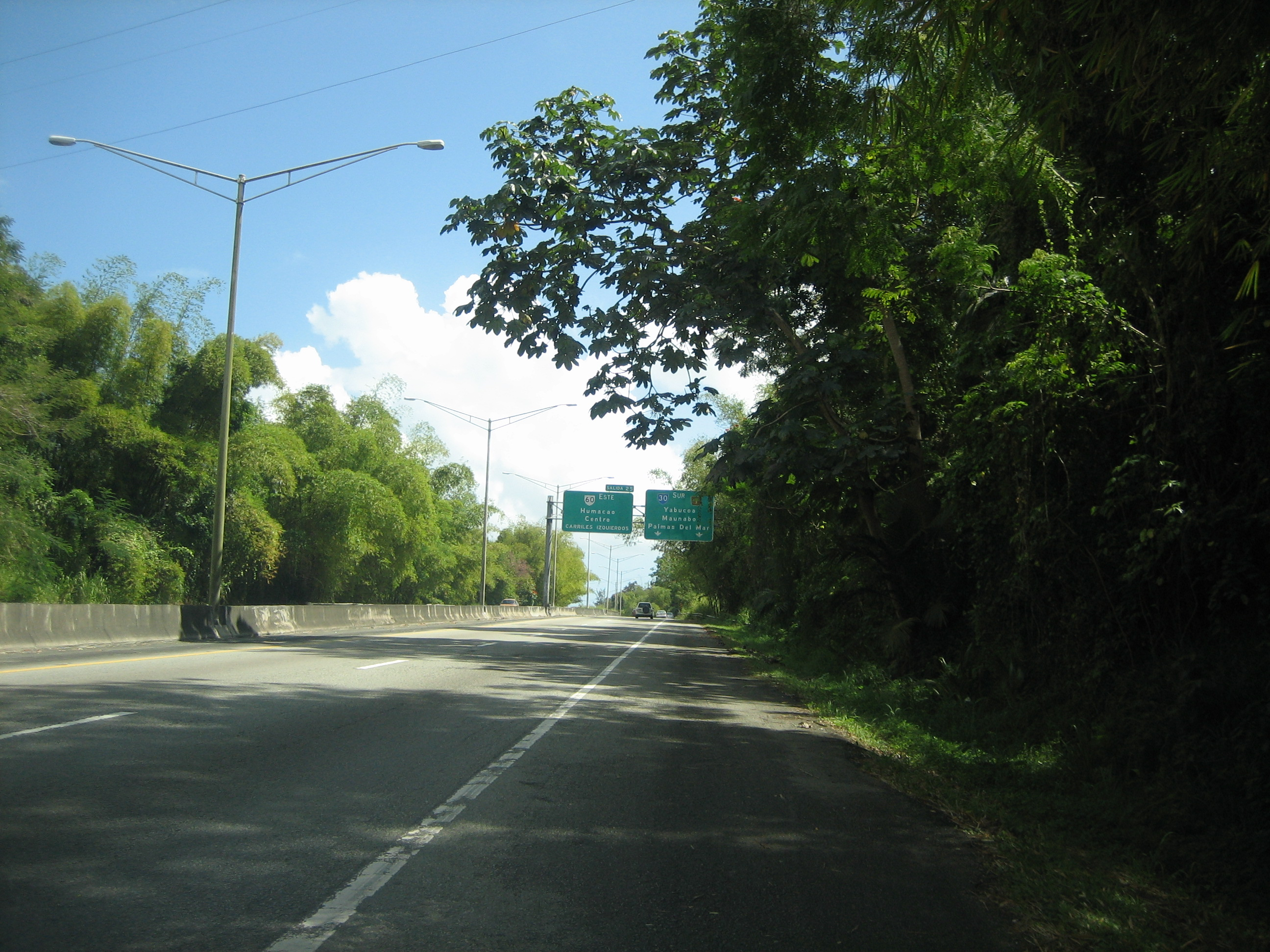
- Puerto Rico Highway 30 in Tejas

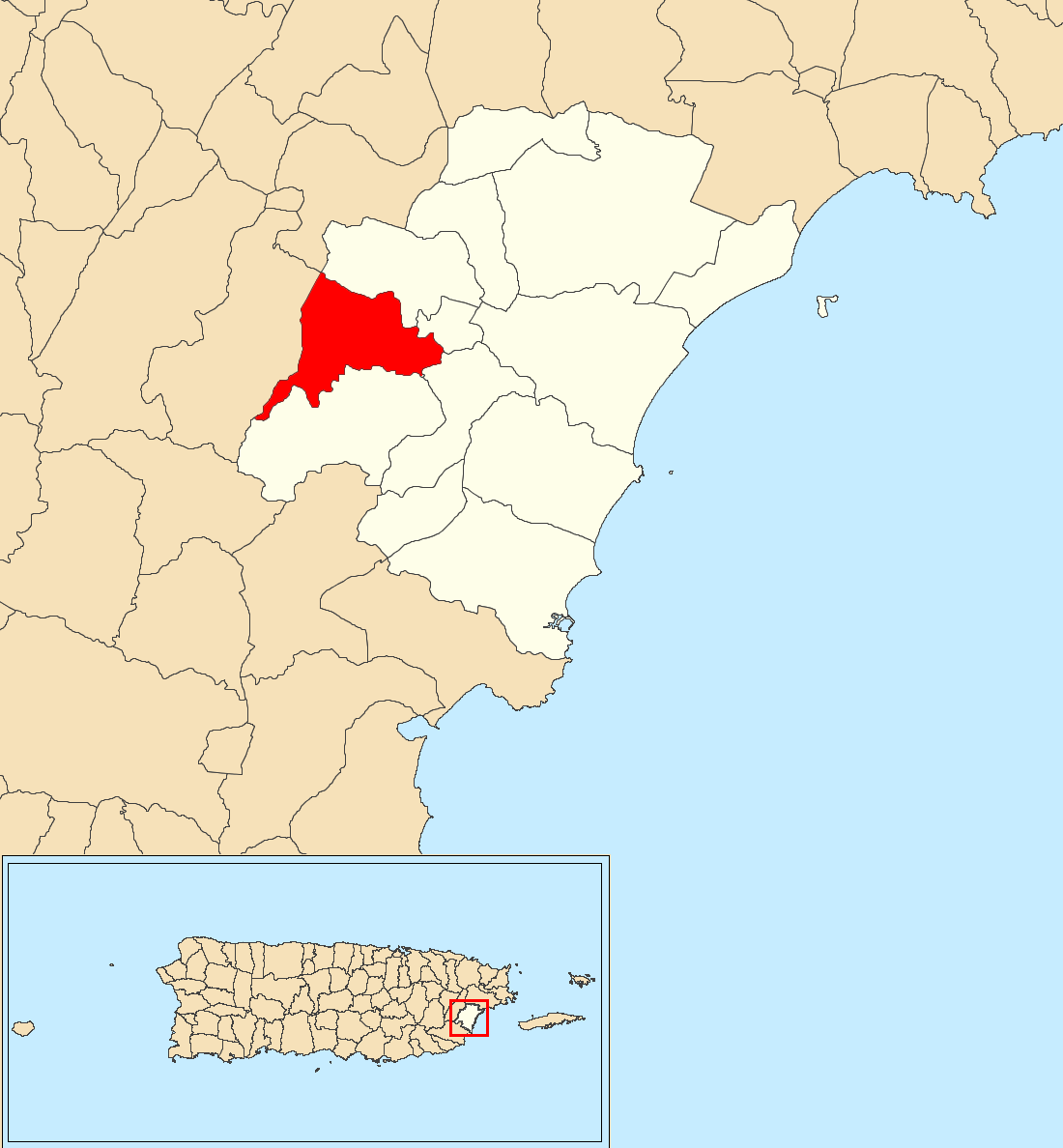
- Location of Tejas within the municipality of Humacao shown in red

- Location of Puerto Rico
- Coordinates: 18°08′52″N 65°50′31″W
- Commonwealth: Puerto Rico
- Municipality: Humacao

Area
  - Total: 2.99 sq mi (7.7 km^{2})
  - Land: 2.99 sq mi (7.7 km^{2})
  - Water: 0 sq mi (0 km^{2})
- Elevation: 230 ft (70 m)

Population (2010)
  - Total: 6,821
  - Density: 2,281.3/sq mi (880.8/km^{2})
- Source: 2010 Census
- Time zone: UTC−4 (AST)
- ZIP Code: 00791

Tejas is a barrio in the municipality of Humacao, Puerto Rico. Its population in 2010 was 6,821.

== History ==
Tejas was in Spain's gazetteers until Puerto Rico was ceded by Spain in the aftermath of the Spanish–American War under the terms of the Treaty of Paris of 1898 and became an unincorporated territory of the United States. In 1899, the United States Department of War conducted a census of Puerto Rico finding that the population of Tejas barrio was 704.

Historical population
Census	Pop.	Note	%±
1900	704		—
1910	753		7.0%
1920	1,084		44.0%
1930	1,033		−4.7%
1940	892		−13.6%
1950	1,622		81.8%
1960	1,628		0.4%
1970	0		−100.0%
1980	5,035		—
1990	7,682		52.6%
2000	8,004		4.2%
2010	6,821		−14.8%
U.S. Decennial Census; 1899 (shown as 1900) 1910-1930; 1930-1950 1980-2000 2010

== See also ==
- List of communities in Puerto Rico
