= Mariana, Cuenca =

Mariana
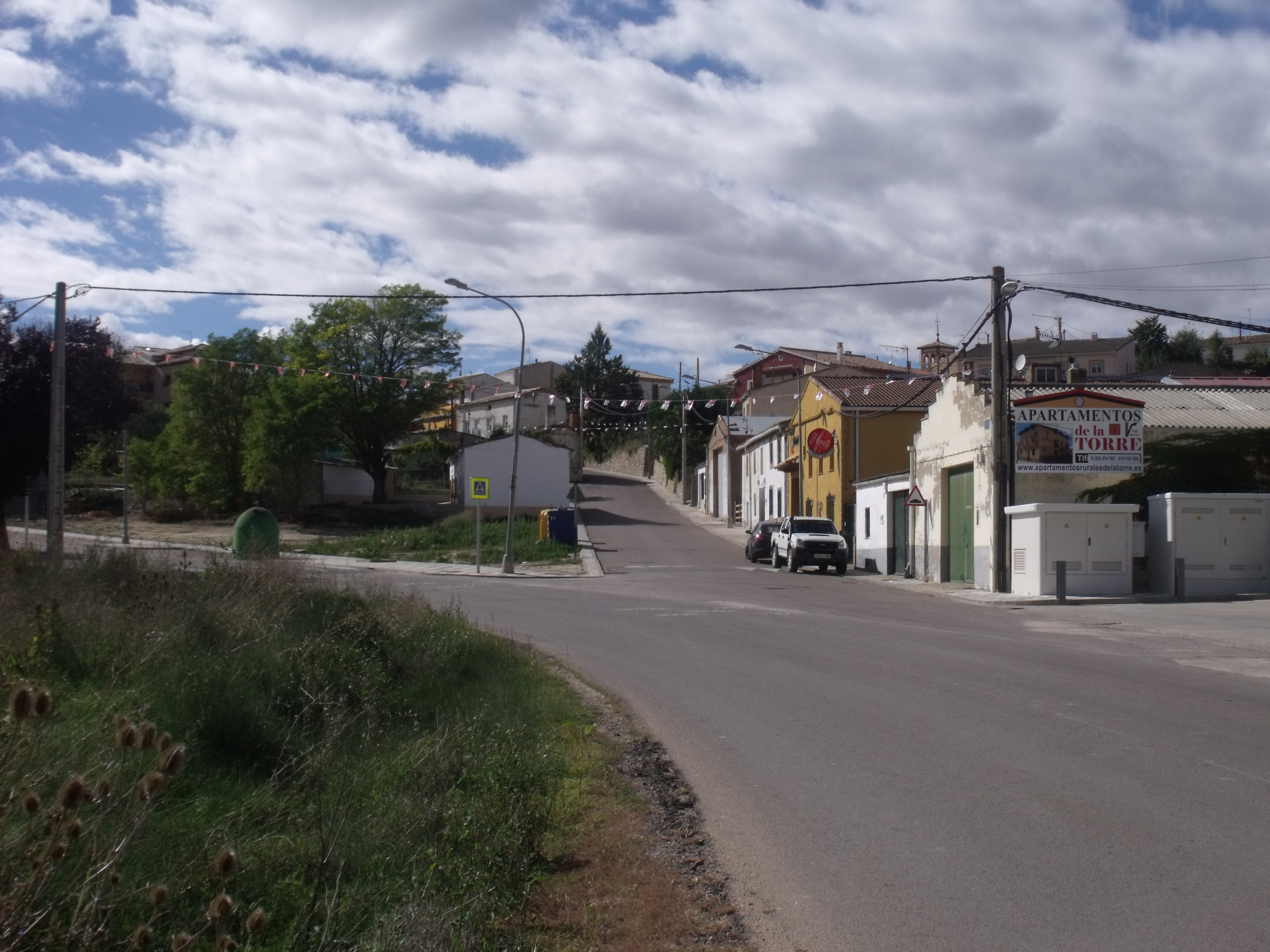

- Location within Spain Location within Castilla-La Mancha
- Coordinates: 40°10′00″N 2°08′43″W
- Country: Spain
- Autonomous community: Castile-La Mancha
- Province: Cuenca
- Municipality: Mariana

Area
  - Total: 39 km^{2} (15 sq mi)
- Elevation: 950 m (3,120 ft)

Population (2025-01-01)
  - Total: 332
  - Density: 8.5/km^{2} (22/sq mi)
- Time zone: UTC+1 (CET)
  - Summer (DST): UTC+2 (CEST)

Mariana is a municipality located in the province of Cuenca, Castile-La Mancha, Spain. According to the 2006 census (INE), the municipality has a population of 334 inhabitants.
