= Mariano =

- Gender: Male
- Language: Italian, Portuguese, Spanish

Origin
- Origin: Latin: Marianus
- Meaning: Child of Marius
- Region of origin: Italy, Portugal, Spain

Other names
- Related names: Marian (Czech; Slovak; Polish), Mariana (female variant)
- See also: Mario, Marios

Mariano is a masculine name from the Romance languages, corresponding to the feminine Mariana.

It is an Italian, Spanish and Portuguese variant of the Roman Marianus which derived from Marius, and Marius derived from the Roman god Mars (see also Ares) or from the Latin maris "male".

Mariano and Marian are sometimes seen as a conjunction of the two female names Mary and Ann. This name is an homage to The Virgin Mary, Mother of Jesus.

Mariano, as a surname, is of Italian, Spanish and Portuguese origin from the personal name Mariano, from the Latin family name Marianus (a derivative of the ancient personal name Marius, of Etruscan origin). In the early Christian era it came to be taken as an adjective derived from Maria, and was associated with the cult of the Virgin Mary. It was borne by various early saints, including a 3rd-century martyr in Numidia and a 5th-century hermit of Berry, France.

== First name ==
- Mariano Armellino (1657–1737), Italian Benedictine historian
- Mariano Azuela, Mexican writer
- Mariano Baracetti, Argentine beach volleyball player
- Mariano d'Ayala (1808–1877), Sicilian soldier and politician
- Mariano Díaz Mejía, Dominican football player
- Mariano Duncan, baseball player and coach
- Mariano Egaña, Chilean lawyer and politician
- Mariano Fernández Bermejo (born 1948), Spanish jurist and politician
- Mariano Ferreira Filho (born 1986), Brazilian footballer
- Mariano Frumboli, Argentine tango dancer
- Mariano González, Argentine footballer
- Mariano Grondona, Argentine journalist
- Mariano Hoyas, Spanish footballer
- Mariano Iberico Rodríguez, Peruvian philosopher
- Mariano Marquez, Puerto Rican boxer
- Mariano Martínez, Argentine actor and model
- Mariano Moreno, Argentine national hero
- Mariano Mores, Argentine tango pianist and composer
- Mariano Navarro Rubio, Spanish politician
- Mariano Navone, Argentine tennis player
- Mariano Ozores (1926–2025), Spanish film director and screenwriter
- Mariano Ponce, Filipino physician and member of the Propaganda Movement
- Mariano Rajoy, Spanish politician, Prime Minister of Spain (2011–2018)
- Mariano Rampolla, Italian cardinal
- Mariano Rivera, baseball player
- Mariano Eduardo de Rivero y Ustáriz (1798–1857), Peruvian scientist and mineralogist
- Mariano Rubio, Spanish economist
- Mariano Scartezzini, Italian long-distance runner
- Mariano Sori-Marin (born 1999), American football coach
- Mariano Torres, Argentine footballer
- Mariano Trías, Filipino vice president of the brief Republic of Biak-na-Bato
- Mariano Troilo, Italian footballer
- Mariano Trípodi, Argentine footballer
- Mariano Vallejo, Californian politician, military commander, and rancher
- Mariano Zabaleta, Argentine tennis player
- Mariano Di Vaio, Italian fashion blogger

== Surname ==
- Aaron Mariano (died 2003), Belizean shooting victim
- Amber Mariano, American television personality
- Ayra Mariano, Filipina-American actress, singer, dancer, host and model
- Belle Mariano, Filipina actress, model and singer
- Bob Mariano, American corporate executive
- Charlie Mariano, American jazz musician
- Eleanor Concepcion Mariano, also known as Connie Mariano, former White House physician
- Jarah Mariano, American model
- Jess Mariano, a fictional character from Gilmore Girls
- Jimmy Mariano (1941–2025), Filipino basketball player and coach
- Joseph Mariano, flutist
- Guy Mariano, professional skateboarder
- Lucas Mariano (born 1993), Brazilian basketball player
- Luis Mariano, Spanish-French singer
- Mariano (footballer, born 1975), Portuguese footballer, full name Carlos Alberto Teixeira Mariano
- Michael Mariano, Somali politician
- Olegário Mariano, Brazilian poet and politician
- Otacílio Mariano Neto (born 1982), Brazilian footballer
- Nelson Mariano, chess grandmaster
- Rafael de Jesus Mariano (born 1990), Brazilian footballer
- Rob Mariano, American television personality
- Sivan Mariano, contestant on cycle 1 of Israel's Next Top Model
- Ian Mariano, a Guamanian international footballer

== See also ==
- Marianopolis College, often nicknamed Mariano
