= Mariana, Humacao, Puerto Rico =

Place in Humacao, Puerto Rico

Mariana
- Barrio
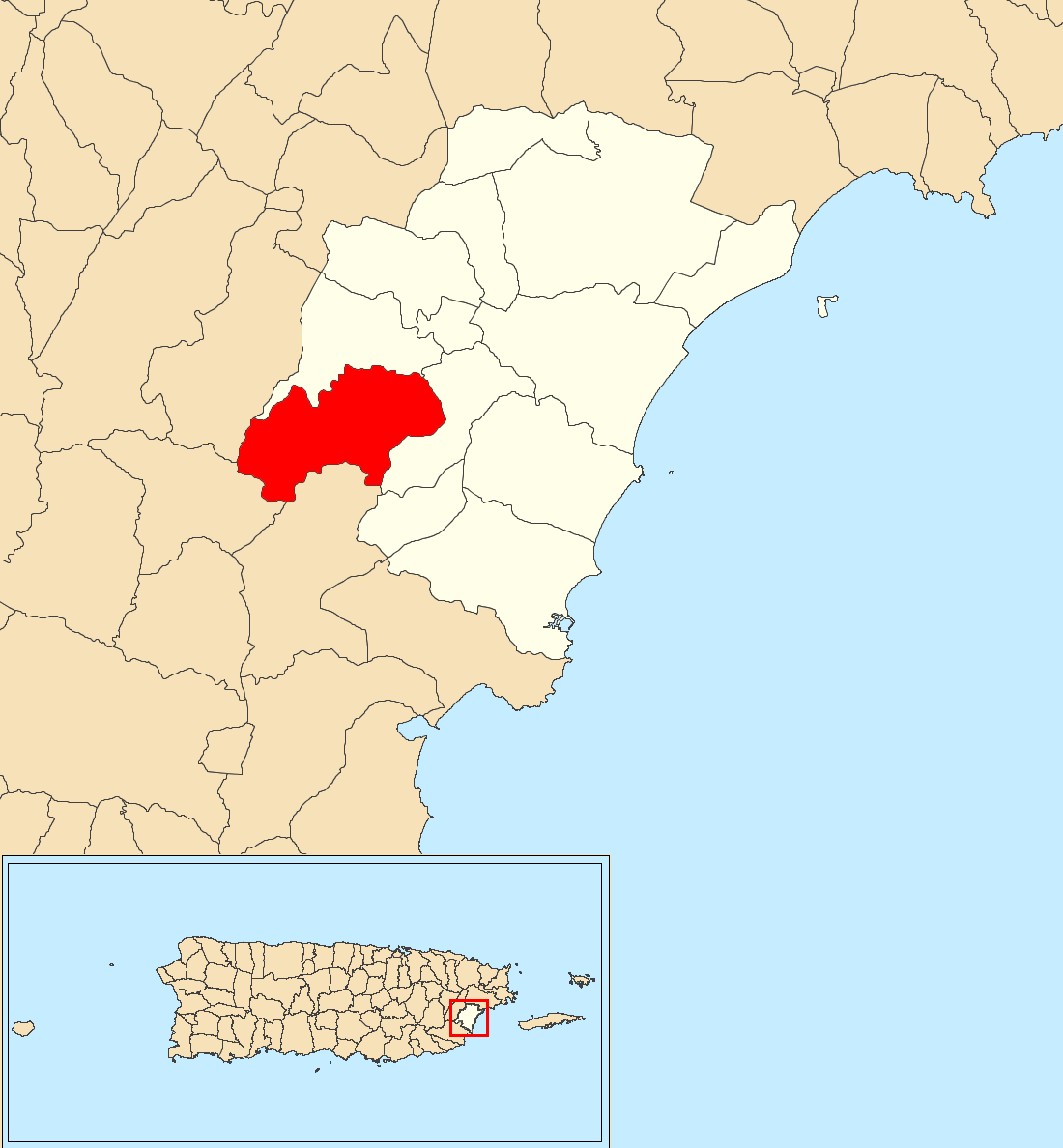
- Location of Mariana within the municipality of Humacao shown in red

- Location of Puerto Rico
- Coordinates: 18°07′34″N 65°51′10″W
- Commonwealth: Puerto Rico
- Municipality: Humacao

Area
  - Total: 4.37 sq mi (11.3 km^{2})
  - Land: 4.37 sq mi (11.3 km^{2})
  - Water: 0 sq mi (0 km^{2})
- Elevation: 545 ft (166 m)

Population (2010)
  - Total: 3,230
  - Density: 739.1/sq mi (285.4/km^{2})
- Source: 2010 Census
- Time zone: UTC−4 (AST)
- ZIP Code: 00791

Mariana is a barrio in the municipality of Humacao, Puerto Rico. Its population in 2010 was 3,230.

== Festivals ==
The breadfruit festival occurs on the last Friday of August ending on Sunday with a span of three days. It celebrates the fruit, and it is prepared in many ways, people make tostones, ice cream, and more with them. Famous salsa singers also perform there, which attracts people from surrounding municipalities like Naguabo and Yabucoa. The breadfruit festival is held in La Loma de La Niña Mariana.

== History ==
Mariana was in Spain's gazetteers until Puerto Rico was ceded by Spain in the aftermath of the Spanish–American War under the terms of the Treaty of Paris of 1898 and became an unincorporated territory of the United States. In 1899, the United States Department of War conducted a census of Puerto Rico finding that the population of Mariana barrio was 1,296.

Historical population
Census	Pop.	Note	%±
1900	1,296		—
1910	1,586		22.4%
1920	1,878		18.4%
1930	1,944		3.5%
1940	2,739		40.9%
1950	2,182		−20.3%
1960	2,439		11.8%
1970	1,944		−20.3%
1980	2,539		30.6%
1990	2,979		17.3%
2000	3,237		8.7%
2010	3,230		−0.2%
U.S. Decennial Census; 1899 (shown as 1900) 1910-1930; 1930-1950 1980-2000 2010

== See also ==
- List of communities in Puerto Rico
