= Humacao Customs House =

- U.S. National Register of Historic Places
- Puerto Rico Historic Sites and Zones
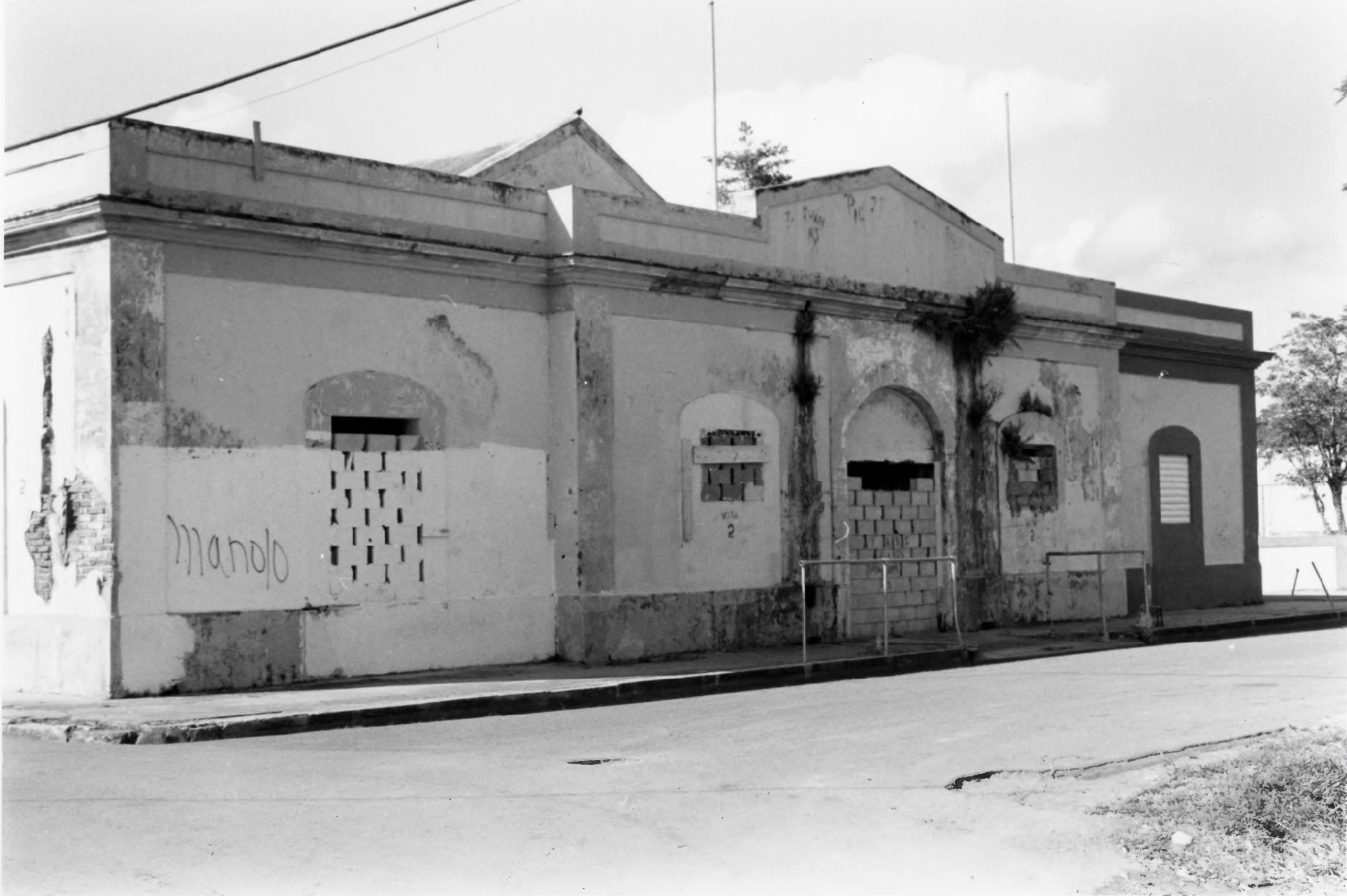
- The abandoned building in 1995.

- Location within Puerto Rico
- Location: Junction of Marina and Aduana Streets Humacao, Puerto Rico
- Coordinates: 18°9′54″N 65°44′38″W
- Built: 1872
- Architect: Julian Cruellas y Rovira
- Architectural style: Spanish Colonial
- NRHP reference No.: 95000599
- RNSZH No.: 2000-(RE)-18-JP-SH

Significant dates
- Added to NRHP: May 18, 1995
- Designated RNSZH: May 16, 2001

The Old Customs House of Humacao (Spanish: Antigua Aduana de Humacao) is a historic building located in Punta Santiago, in the municipality of Humacao, Puerto Rico. The structure was designed in the Spanish Colonial style, architecturally and typologically and finished in 1872 by the Department of Public Works of the Spanish Government in Puerto Rico. Until this time, the customs house was a temporary wooden building, so the need for a permanent structure made it possible that, in 1865, it was decided to construct the present building to serve as the new customs house at Punta Santiago.

The structure served as a school building, named the Francisco Isern School, during the 20th century until it was abandoned. It was added to the United States National Register of Historic Places on May 18, 1995, and to the Puerto Rico Register of Historic Sites and Zones on May 16, 2001.

== Gallery ==
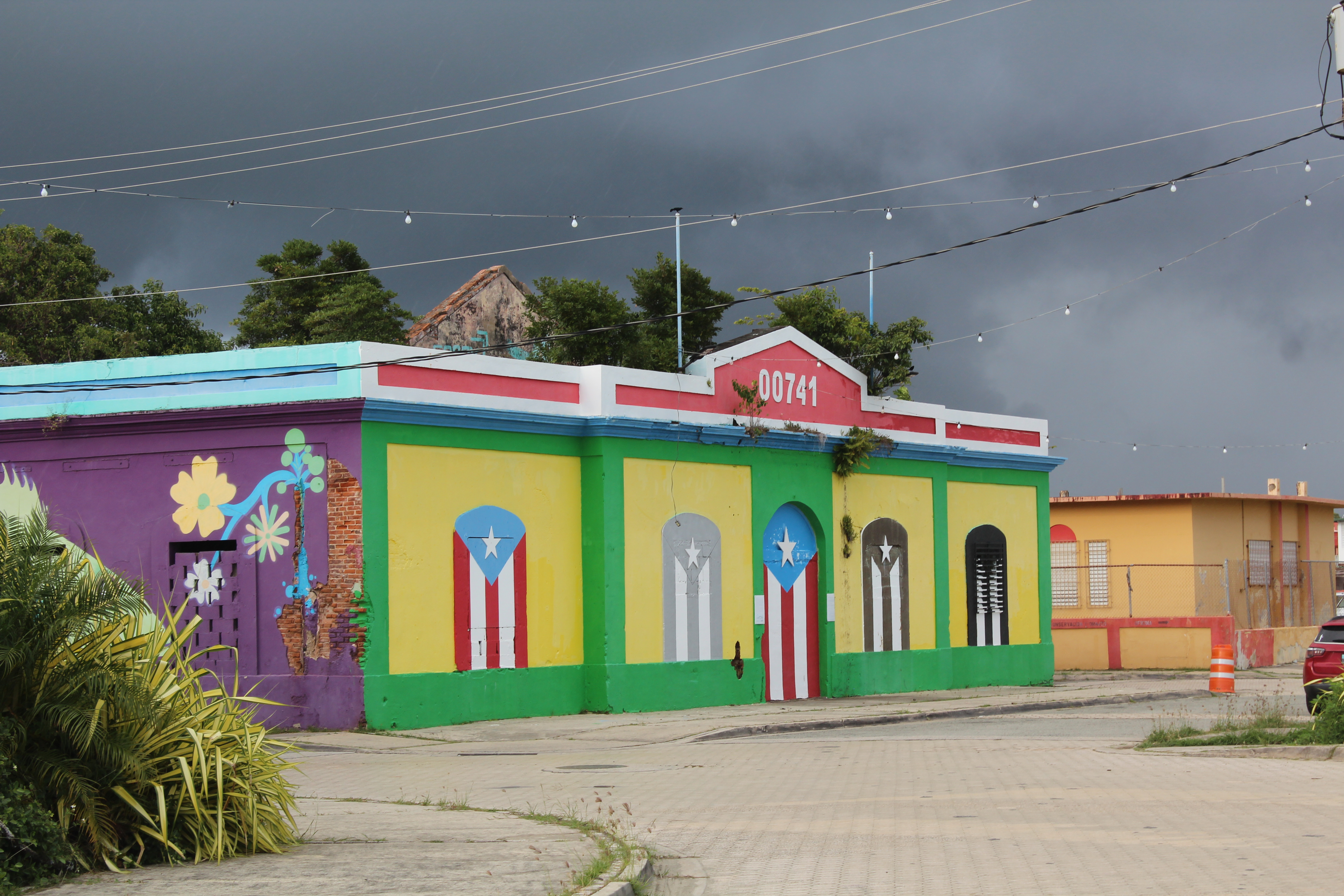
The building in January, 2023.
