= Clarence Ray Carpenter =

American primatologist (1905–1975)

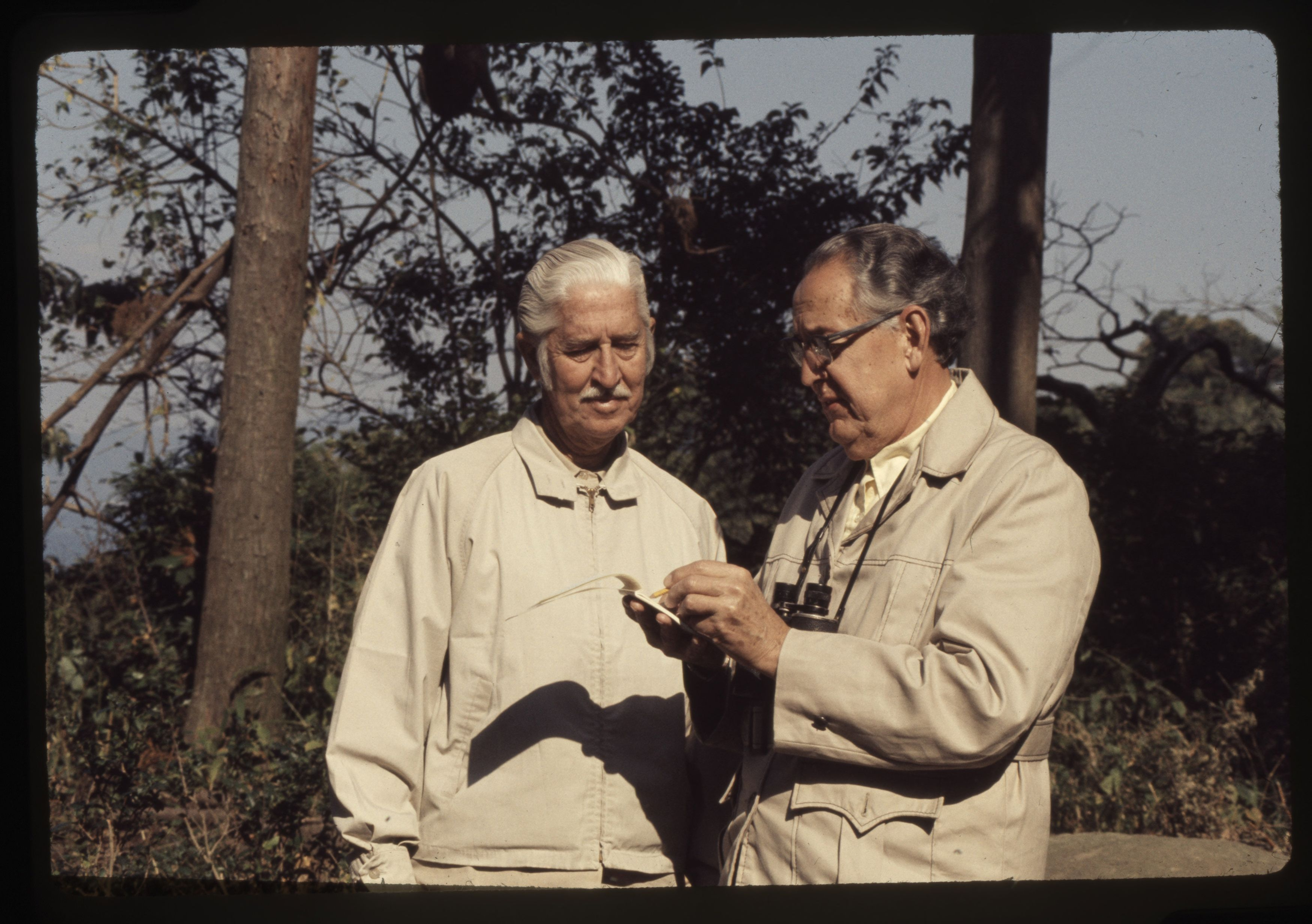
- Ray Carpenter (right) with Marlin Perkins
- Born: November 28, 1905; Lincoln County, North Carolina
- Died: March 1, 1975 (aged 69); Athens, Georgia
- Education: B.S. and M.S. Duke University. PhD. Stanford University.
- Known for: Cayo Santiago Rhesus Colony. Film & video of primate behavior.
- Spouse: Ruth Jones Carpenter (1966-1975, his death)
- Scientific career
- Fields: Primatology
- Workplaces: New Haven Medical School, Yale University. Bard College, Columbia University. College of Physicians and Surgeons, School of Tropical Medicine, Puerto Rico. Yerkes Primate Center, University of Georgia. Pennsylvania State University.
- Doctoral advisor: Robert M. Yerkes

Clarence Ray Carpenter (usually credited as C. R. Carpenter) (November 28, 1905 – March 1, 1975), an American primatologist, was one of the first scientific investigators to record the behavior of primates in their natural environments.

From 1931 to 1934, Carpenter conducted influential field research on primates under the sponsorship of Yale University professor Robert M. Yerkes. Carpenter studied howler and spider monkeys in Panama and gibbons in Thailand. He was the first to recognize that gibbon society consisted of an adult pair, male and female, and their offspring.

Carpenter's field work, part of the Asiatic Primate Expedition team, has been noted for bringing scientific rigor for primate field studies, setting new and lasting standards for data collection. This includes determining how to get an accurate count of individuals, recording and interpreting primate calls, and improving understanding of other complex social behaviors. He clarified and pioneered methods of habituation for wild primates and made explicit the standards for the acceptance of naturalistic observations as facts. According to Irven DeVore, "for the succeeding thirty years almost all of the accurate information available on the behavior of monkeys and apes living in natural environments was the result of Carpenter's research and writing." Carpenter's lar gibbon, Hylobates lar carpenteri, is named in his honor.

Though known for his innovations in field work, Carpenter also advocated for breeding rhesus macaques for scientific experimentation. He initiated an effort to move 400 monkeys from India to Santiago Island, now part of Puerto Rico, for experimentation. Carpenter believed that scientifically understanding primates called for a mix of lab and field research. After observing gibbons in the wild, for example, he collected and killed individual animals to examine their stomach contents.

Born in Lincoln County, North Carolina, Carpenter earned his Bachelor of Science (1928) and Master of Science (1929) degrees at Duke University and his Doctor of Philosophy (1932) degree at Stanford University.

== Books ==
- Behavioral Regulators of Behavior in Primates. C. R. Carpenter, ed. Lewisburg, Pennsylvania: Bucknell University Press, 1974. Hardcover: ISBN 0-8387-1099-9, ISBN 978-0-8387-1099-9.

== Films ==
- C.R. Carpenter Primate Studies Series Pennsylvania State University

== Papers ==
- "Behavior and Social Relations of the Howling Monkey," Comparative Psychology Monographs, Johns Hopkins University, May, 1934.
- "Field Study in Siam of the Behavior and social Relations of the Gibbon," Comparative Psychology Monographs, Johns Hopkins University, December, 1940.
- "Societies of Monkeys and Apes," Biological Symposia, v. 8, 1942.
- "Evolutionary interpretation of human behavior," Transactions of the New York Academy of Sciences, 1942.
- "Social Behavior of the Primates," Colloques internationaux du Centre national de la recherche scientifique, v. 34, March, 1950.
