= Malecón of Naguabo =

Esplanade in Naguabo, Puerto Rico

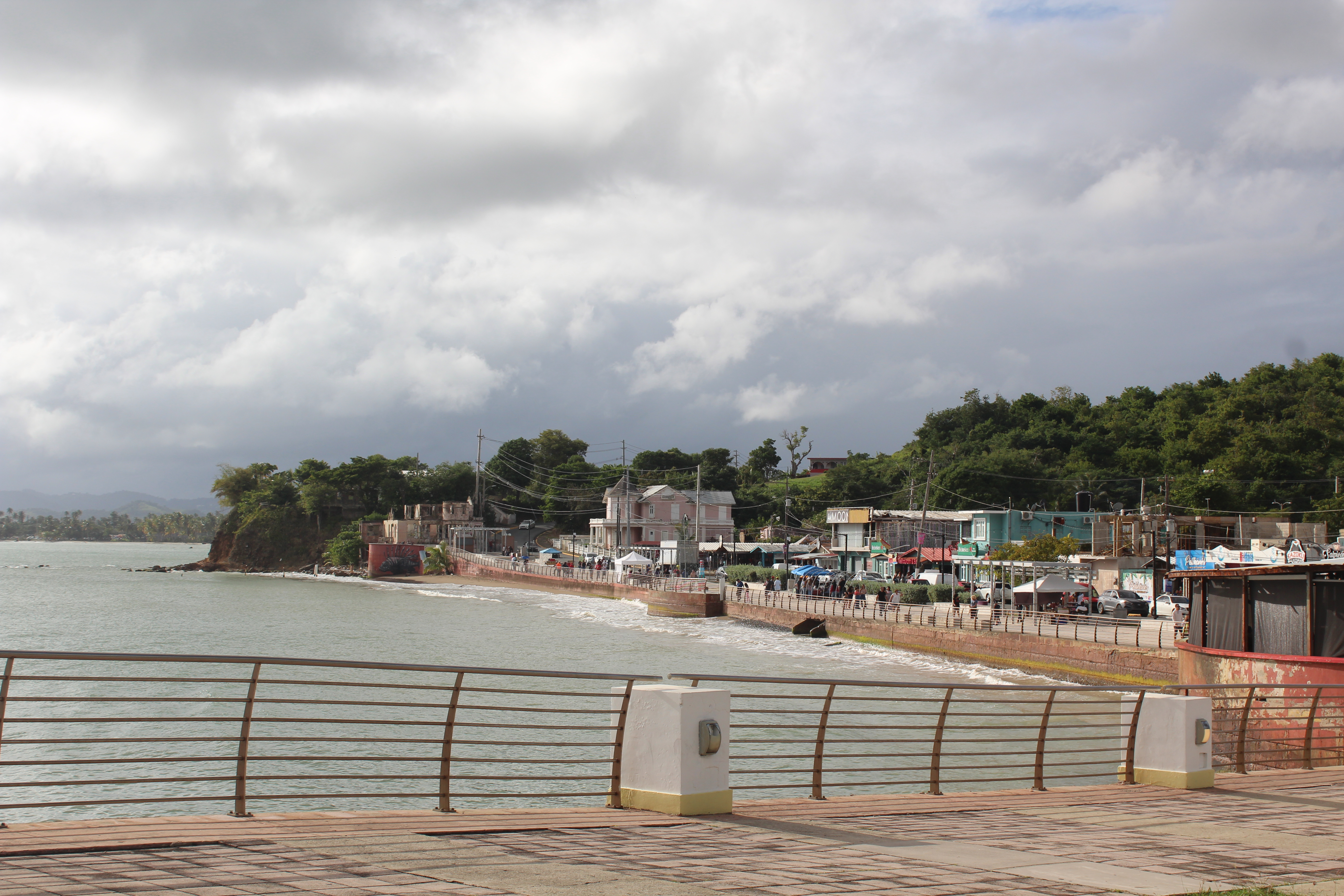
Malecón de Húcares (2023)

The Malecón of Naguabo, officially known as the Malecón de La Playa Húcares, is a waterfront esplanade and tourist attraction located in Húcares, Naguabo in southeastern Puerto Rico. The esplanade and its surrounding area are popularly known as the Playa Húcares, to distinguish it from the rest of the barrio of Húcares. The malecón is a popular tourist attraction due to its panoramic vistas of Vieques, Cayo Santiago and El Yunque, the high number of traditional seafood restaurants (particularly the pastelillos de chapín or trunkfish empanadas), opportunities for boat rentals and watersports, and its fishing piers. The area is home to numerous Victorian houses, such as the National Register of Historic Places-listed Villa Del Mar (popularly known as El Castillo). The municipality of Naguabo also has a tourist information center in Playa Húcares.

The malecón is located along route PR-3, about 2 miles (3 km) southeast of Naguabo Pueblo, the administrative and historic downtown of the municipality of Naguabo. Although the Húcares fishing village (villa pesquera) exists since the foundation of the municipality of Naguabo, the current waterfront esplanade dates to 1990, with upgrades made in the 2010s and reconstructions made in the aftermath of Hurricane Maria in 2017.

== Gallery ==
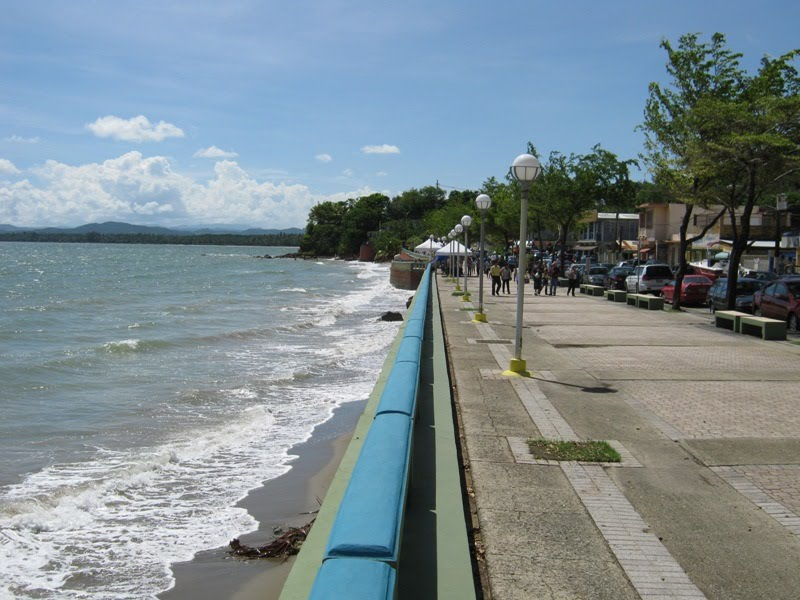
Malecón in 2010

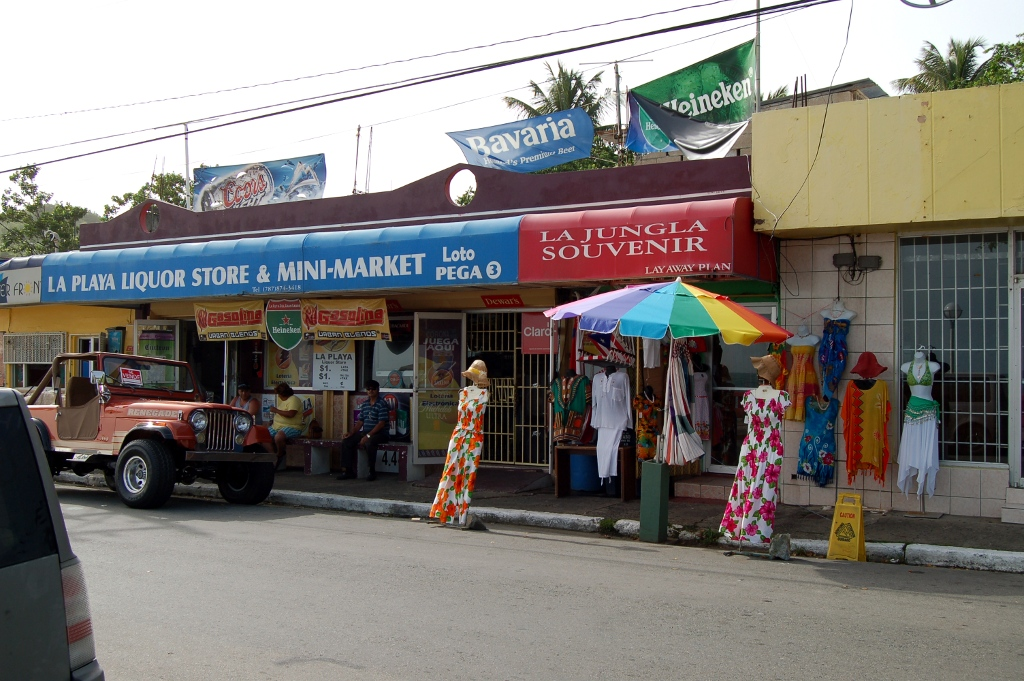
Souvenir stores in 2009

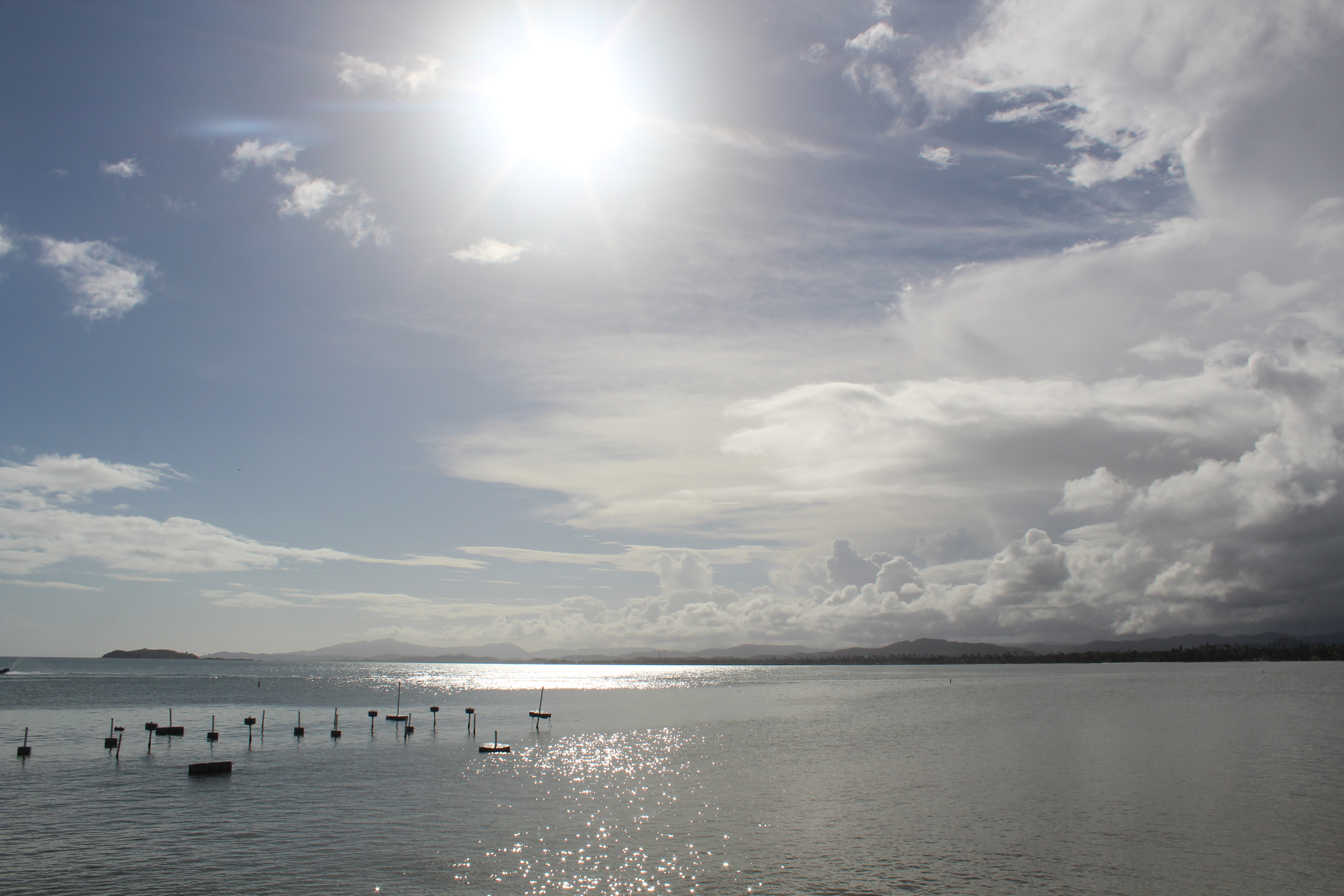
View of Cayo Santiago and Sierra de Luquillo, January 2023.

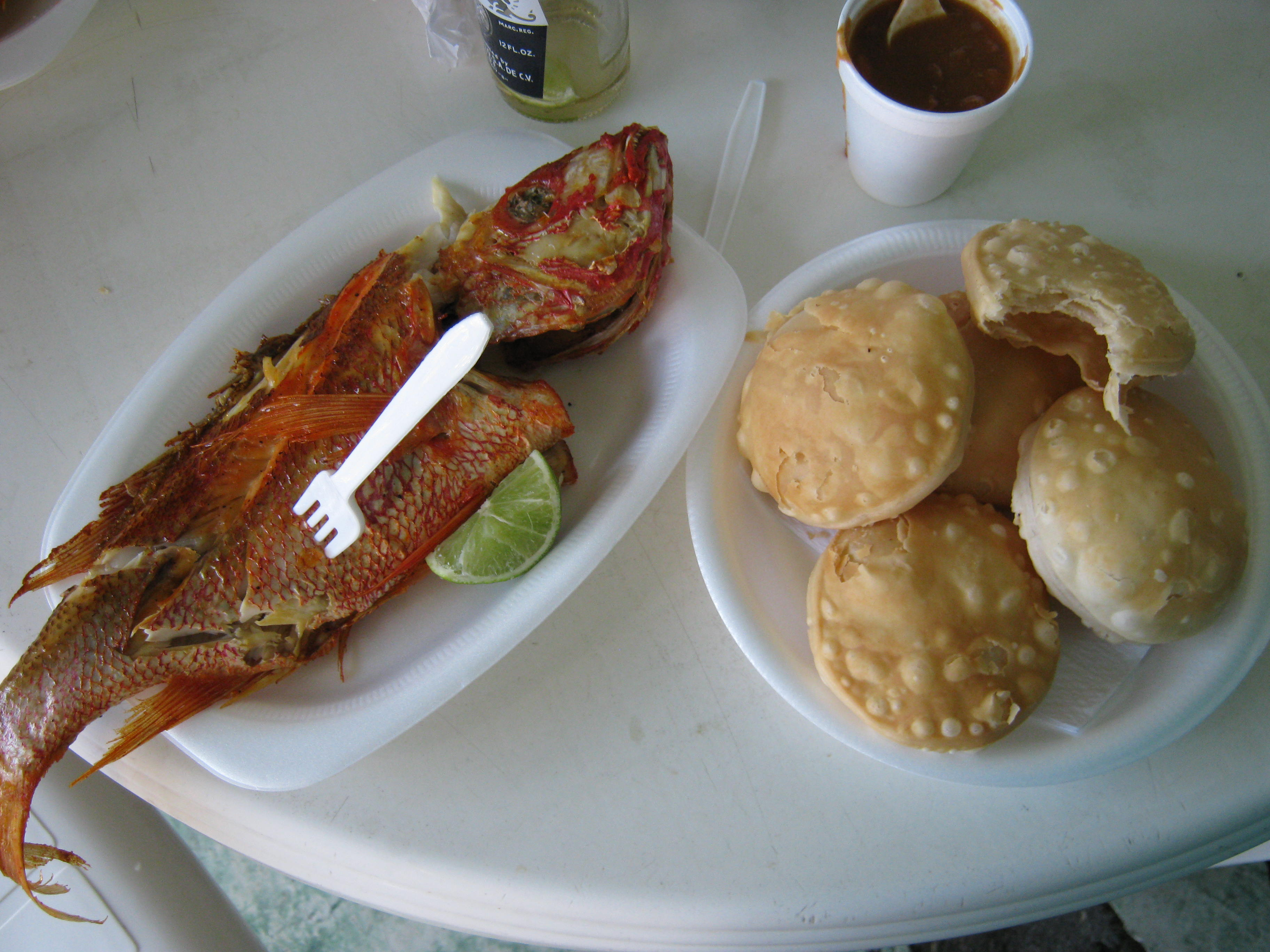
Red snapper (chillo) and domplines (Puerto Rican arepas) at a seafood restaurant in the malecón.

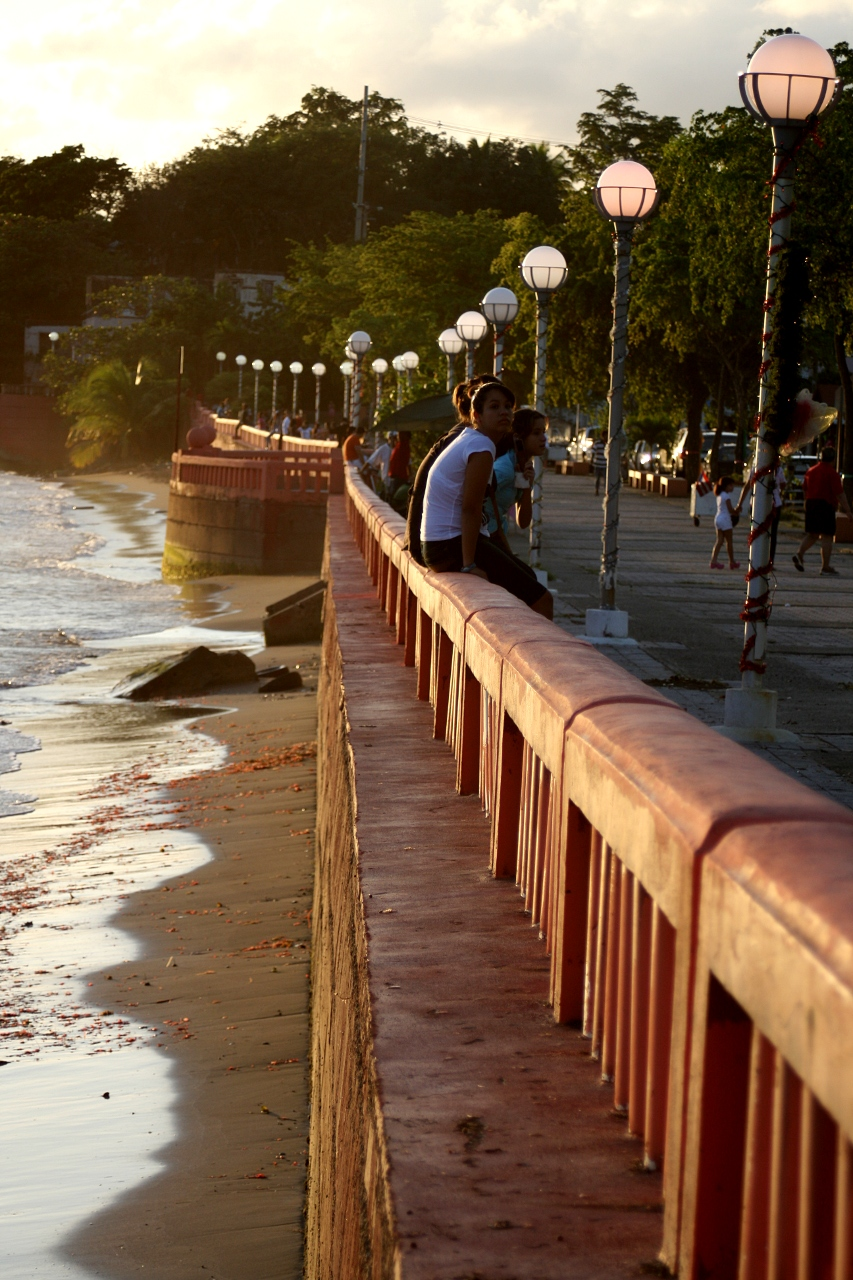
The boardwalk in 2010

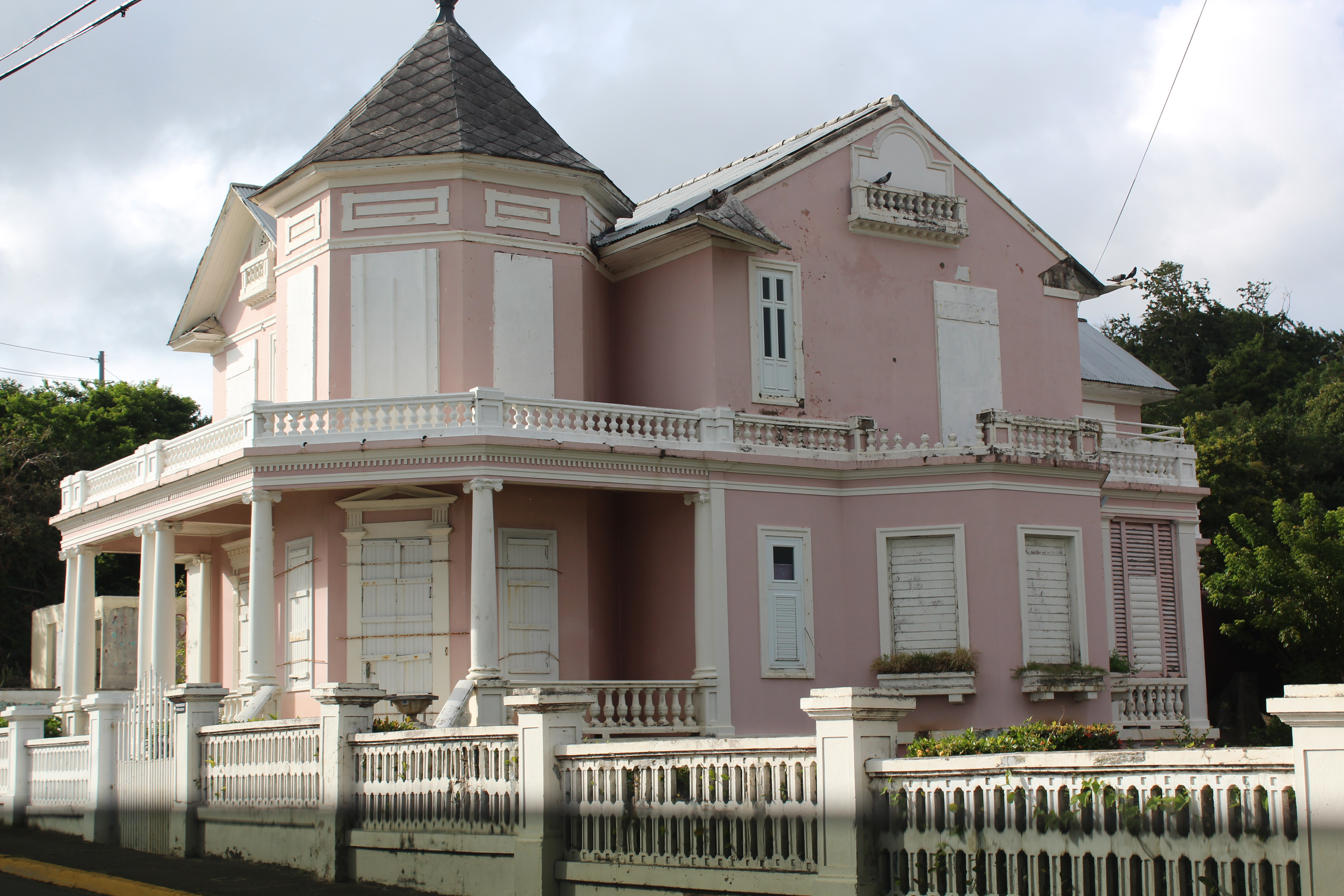
Historic Victorian house at the western end (2023)
