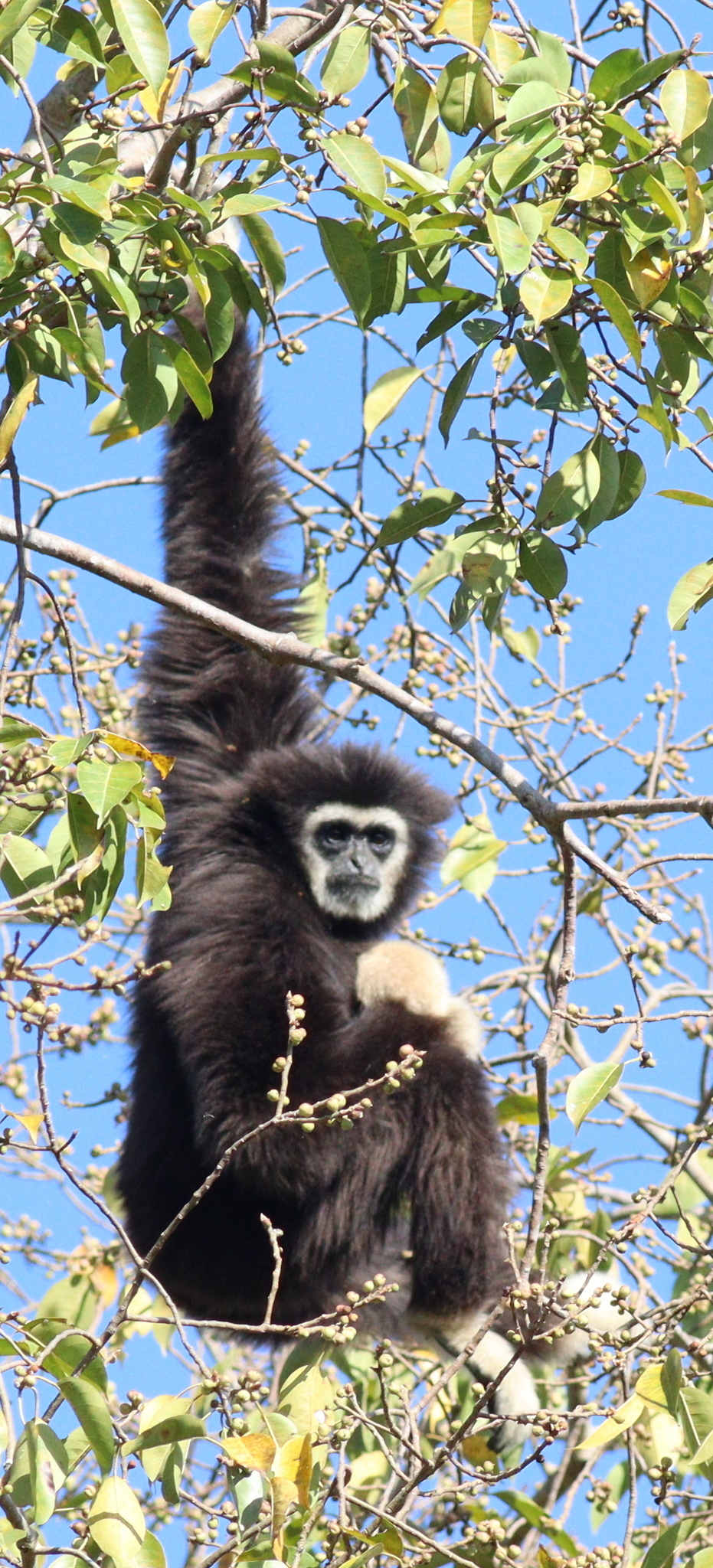

Conservation status
- Endangered (IUCN 3.1)

Scientific classification
- Kingdom: Animalia
- Phylum: Chordata
- Class: Mammalia
- Order: Primates
- Superfamily: Hominoidea
- Family: Hylobatidae
- Genus: Hylobates
- Species: H. lar
- Subspecies: H. l. carpenteri

Trinomial name
- Hylobates lar carpenteri Groves, 1968

= Carpenter's lar gibbon =

Subspecies of ape

Carpenter's lar gibbon (Hylobates lar carpenteri) is an endangered subspecies of white-handed gibbon, also known as the lar gibbon. It is listed as an endangered species because it is believed to have undergone a decline of more than 50% in the prior three generations due to loss of forest habitat and loss of mature individuals to hunting. The subspecific name honors primatologist Clarence R. Carpenter.

The subspecies is distinguished by sharply distinct dark and light color forms, both having a ring of white hair around the face, with hands and feet white sometimes as far as the wrists and ankles, and the hair much longer than in other subspecies. The dark form is very dark chocolate brown, the tips of the hairs being blackish and their bases silvery-brown, whereas the light form is creamy-white, with the basal one-quarter to one-third of the hairs light gray. Its range is confined to northern and part of northeastern Thailand. In the southwest part of its range, its distribution abuts that of the pileated gibbon, Hylobates pileatus.
