= Villa Del Mar =

- U.S. National Register of Historic Places
- Puerto Rico Historic Sites and Zones
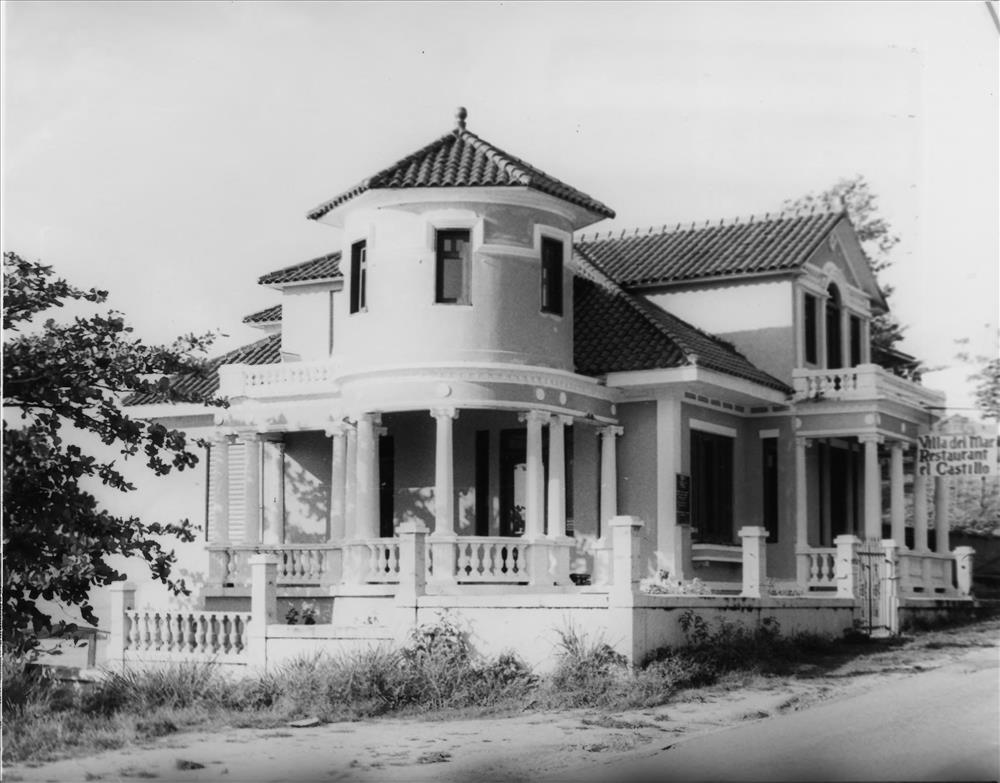
- Villa Del Mar in 1977.

- Location within Puerto Rico
- Location: PR-3, Km 66.2 Húcares, Naguabo, Puerto Rico
- Coordinates: 18°11′20″N 65°42′54″W
- Built: 1917
- Architect: Antonio Higuera
- Architectural style: Late 19th and 20th century Revivals (elements of Victorian and Criollo styles)
- NRHP reference No.: 83002293
- RNSZH No.: 2000-(RE)-18-JP-SH

Significant dates
- Added to NRHP: June 23, 1983
- Designated RNSZH: May 16, 2001

Villa Del Mar, popularly known as El Castillo, is a historic 1917 residence located in Naguabo, Puerto Rico, in the vicinity of the Malecón of Naguabo.

Villa Del Mar is located in a coastal settlement named Húcares, also known as Naguabo Playa, in a section of PR-3 by the malecón that is home to numerous notorious Criollo-style residences with elements of and inspired by Late Victorian (Queen Anne) architecture. The building, also inspired by the previously mentioned architectural styles, was built in 1917 for Mr. Faustino Rodríguez and Mrs. Carmen Fuertes, owners of the Triunfo (Central Triunfo) and Gurabo (Central Gurabo) Sugarcane Refineries, located in Naguabo and Gurabo, respectively. The structure was important in the architectural development of private residences of sugarcane plantation owners of Puerto Rico during the early 20th century.

The historic residence was added to the National Register of Historic Places in 1983 and to the Puerto Rico Register of Historic Sites and Zones in 2001. At the time of the NRHP-listing the building was owned by Arnaldo Castro López, and in addition to having served as a private residence it had served as a municipal center and as a restaurant. The building was last restored between 1980 and 1982. Local folklore and popular culture describe the structure as being haunted. As of 2023, the building is in ruins after falling into disrepair in the aftermath of hurricanes and neglect.

== See also ==
- National Register of Historic Places listings in eastern Puerto Rico
