= Cayo Batata =

Uninhabited island of Puerto Rico

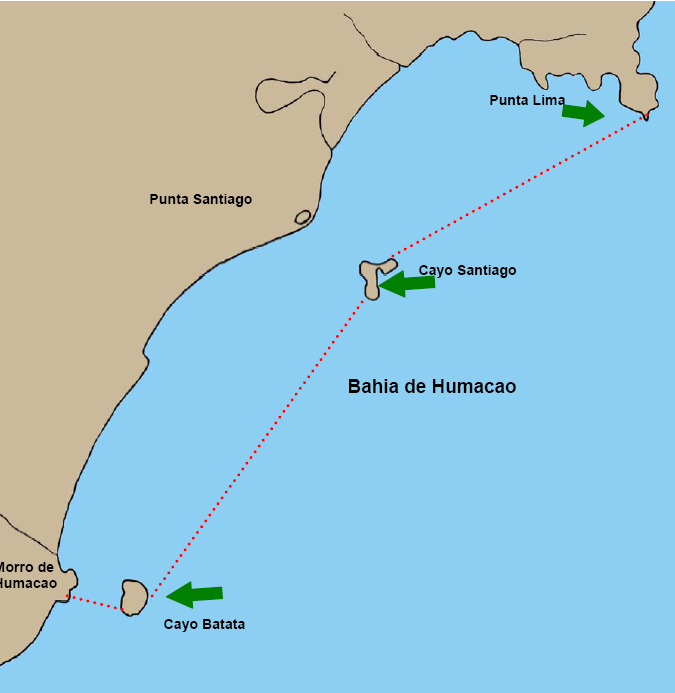
- Map of Humacao Estuary with Cayo Batata in the southwest

- Location within Puerto Rico Location within Lesser Antilles Location within the Caribbean

Geography
- Location: Humacao, Puerto Rico
- Coordinates: 18°6′56″N 65°46′17″W
- Area: 4,679 m^{2} (50,360 sq ft)
- Highest elevation: 12.1 m (39.7 ft)
- Commonwealth: Puerto Rico
- Municipality: Humacao

Cayo Batata is an uninhabited, grass-covered island, located at 18°06′56″N 65°46′17″W, 1,969 feet (600 m) east of Morro de Humacao, the closest mainland feature (which is immediately south of the mouth of Río Humacao), in Humacao, Puerto Rico.

== Geography ==
The island is rectangular with sides between 197 and 230 feet (60 and 70 m) in length. It is up to 39.7 ft (12.1 m) high. The area is 50,364.34 square feet (4,679.00 m^{2}) (Block 3060, Block Group 3, Census Tract 1805, Humacao Municipio, Puerto Rico). The island is part of Río Abajo barrio of Humacao.

A bare ledge, with five rocks and a reef, called Caballo Blanco (literally, White Horse, not to be confused with the islet of same name northwest of Vieques) awash and steep-to, is located 492 to 984 feet (150 to 300 m) east and south of Cayo Batata.

Cayo Santiago (Monkey Island), the second island belonging to Humacao, is located 3.5 mi (5.6 km) to the northeast.

== Gallery ==
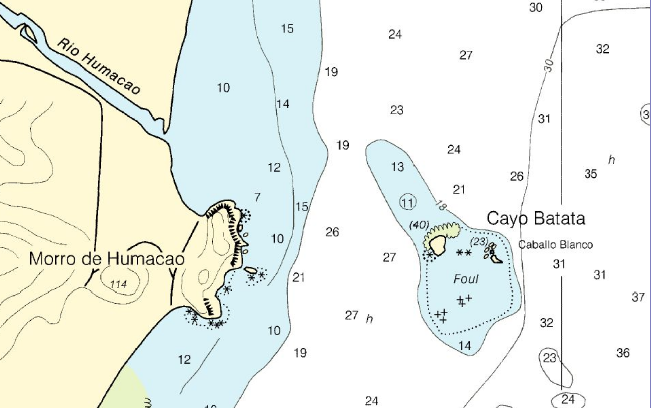
Nautical chart of Cayo Batata area
