= Antón Ruiz River =

River of Puerto Rico

Coordinates: 18.1738489°N 65.7396061°W

Río Antón Ruiz

Location
- Commonwealth: Puerto Rico
- Municipality: Humacao

Physical characteristics
- Source
  - location: Collores, Humacao
  - elevation: 344 ft
- Mouth
  - location: Vieques Sound
  - elevation: 0 ft
- Length: 6.73 miles
- Basin size: 8.72 sq miles

The Antón Ruiz River (Spanish: Río Antón Ruiz) is a river of Humacao and Naguabo in Puerto Rico. It is 6.73 miles long, having its origins at the Collores and Mambiche Creeks of barrio Antón Ruiz, in the northeastern hills of the San Lorenzo Batholith, and its source at the Vieques Sound (Canal de Vieques). The river forms the natural boundary between the municipalities of Humacao and Naguabo throughout its Pterocarpus-forested delta, which is protected by the Humacao Nature Reserve.

A bridge carrying Puerto Rico Highway 3 and another bridge carrying Puerto Rico Highway 53 cross over the Antón Ruiz River in Humacao.

== See also ==
- List of rivers of Puerto Rico
