= Candelero River =

River of Puerto Rico

Coordinates: 18.0980189°N 65.7896058°W

- Native name: Río Candelero (Spanish)

Location
- Commonwealth: Puerto Rico
- Municipality: Humacao

Physical characteristics
- Source
  - location: Candelero Arriba, Humacao
- Mouth
  - location: Palmas del Mar in Candelero Abajo, Humacao
  - elevation: 0 ft.

The Candelero River (Spanish: Río Candelero) is a river of Humacao, Puerto Rico.

== See also ==
- List of rivers of Puerto Rico
