= Trelles (surname) =

Trelles is a surname. Notable people with the surname include:

- Augusto Barcía Trelles (1881–1961), Spanish politician, briefly acting Prime Minister of Spain
- Efraín Trelles (1953–2018), Peruvian historian, writer, journalist and sports commentator
- Gustavo Trelles (born 1955), Uruguayan former rally driver
- Ignacio Trelles (1916–2020), Mexican football player and coach
- Norbert Trelle (born 1942), German Roman Catholic bishop
- Rafael Trelles (born 1957), Puerto Rican artist

== See also ==
- José Alonso y Trelles (1857–1924), Uruguayan poet
