= Alicia Candiani =

Argentine artist (born 1953)

- Born: 1953 (age 72–73); Buenos Aires, Argentina
- Known for: Printmaking, digital media
- Website: episodesanditineraries.com

Alicia Candiani (born 1953) is an Argentine artist specializing in printmaking and digital media. She is an active participant in the international printmaking community.

== Work and Life ==
Candiani graduated from the National University of Cordoba, Argentina, where she received a Master in Fine Art in 1976 and a degree in Architecture and Urbanism in 1978. She did postgraduate studies on Latin American Art and art criticism at the University of Buenos Aires (1989/90 and 1992/93), Argentina.

Her international artistic practice consists of expanded print and digital media work, architectural interventions and collaborative art projects, as well as curated exhibitions. In her professional activity, she includes three conjoined strategies: production-exhibition, critical discourse, and education-collaborative work encompassing artists, students, and communities around the world.

In 2005, Candiani founded Proyecto Ace, an artist-in-residence program located in Buenos Aires. The international residency program promotes artistic exchange between visiting artists and the local art community through collaborative work, studio discussions and exhibitions. Contemporary printmaking, especially projects that explore the use of photography, design, and digital media is a special focus of the centre.

Candiani is an active participant in the international printmaking community. She served as the international member on the Executive Committee of the Southern Graphics Council 2008-2010. She has served as a jury member in numerous international print exhibitions and biennials.

From 2005 to 2011, Candiani led The Self-Portraits Project. In nearly one hundred self-portraits, artists offer insights into their lives and personal concerns while addressing controversial issues such as sexual identity, aging, and stereotypes. Eleven nationalities, six countries, eight sessions hosted by major artistic institutions participated over the term of the project. Guest artists included Rafael Trelles, Guillermo Nunez and Hugh Merrill.

== Recognition ==
Candiani’s work has been shown in over 300 shows and one-person exhibitions since 1977. It has been the recipient of major international awards, including the first prize in Prints without Borders in Oldenburg, Germany (2010) and the Excellence in Fine Arts Award, Turner Museum, USA (2009).

She has been selected by the Argentine National Academy of Fine Arts as one of the ten best printmakers in her country in 1998, 2000 and 2004. In 2010 she represented Argentina in the International Art Biennial in Beijing, China.

Candiani has been awarded residencies at the Kansas City Artists Coalition, Kansas City, USA (2011); Akademija, Belgrade, Serbia (2011); Center of Contemporary Printmaking / International Artist-in-Residence Fellowship, Connecticut, USA (2009), Guanlan Original Print Base, Shenzhen, China (2009); National Chalcography of Madrid, Madrid, Spain (2006); Inky Paper Series, University of Wyoming, USA (2002), Atelier Presse Papier in Trois Riviéres, Canada (1999); Frans Masereel Centre for the Graphics in Kasterlee, Belgium (1997) and Iowa State University/College of Design in Iowa, United States (1991–92).

Alicia has been invited as a guest professor, visiting artist, member of the international jury, curator and lecturer at numerous institutions around the world including the Library of Congress, Washington DC, UNESCO and many universities in the United States as well as art institutions in Spain, Egypt, the Czech Republic, Germany, Sweden, Peru, Mexico, Ecuador, Cuba, Puerto Rico, Brazil, the United Kingdom, Poland, China, Bulgaria, Canada, Portugal and Argentina.
