= Orellano =

Orellano (Spanish pronunciation: [oɾeˈʝano]) is a Spanish-language surname. Notable people with this surname include:

- Luca Orellano (born 2000), Argentine footballer
- Rafael Orellano (born 1973), American baseball player
