= Luis Enrique Juliá =

- Born: September 8, 1953 (age 72); Humacao, Puerto Rico
- Education: Conservatorio Superior de Música Oscar Esplá de Alicante, Universidad de Puerto Rico
- Occupations: guitarist and composer
- Awards: Nomination for a Latin Grammy in Best Classical Album, 2009

Luis Enrique Juliá, composer and guitarist, was nominated for a Latin Grammy award in 2009 in Best Classical Album category for Concierto de Aniversario, a double CD he produced for Pro Arte Musical, containing works by Mendelssohn and Brahms as well as Juliá's own five-movement Quintet for Clarinet and Strings (2008), performed by Ricardo Morales, principal clarinetist of the Philadelphia Orchestra, and the Pacifica Quartet, Musical America's 2009 Ensemble of the Year and quartet-in-residence of New York's Metropolitan Museum of Art from 2009 to 2012.

== Summary ==
Born and raised in Puerto Rico, maestro Juliá has created music in contemporary Caribbean styles for the stage. His ballet scores include Retablo del nacimiento (Tableau of the Birth of Christ), Venus sobre el cielo del Caribe (Venus Above the Caribbean Sky) and Son de Andanza (Sounds of Andanza).

He has also composed songs, dances and incidental music for experimental theater pieces, among them Juegos de obsesión (Games of Obsession), Tartufo (Tartuffe), La bella y la bestia (Beauty and the Beast), Espejos (Mirrors), Don Juan Tenorio, La vida es sueño (Life is a Dream), and Goyita (an hommage to painter Rafael Tufiño in 2013). In 1993 he recorded the CD Luis Enrique Juliá / CARIBE, a combination of classical melodies with popular themes and jazz techniques.

== Studies ==
Although self-taught in the field of composition, Juliá was trained in the tradition of the classical guitar by José Tomás in Spain, Rey de la Torre in California, and Leonardo Egúrbida in Puerto Rico. He participated in master classes with Andrés Segovia, Alirio Díaz, Oscar Ghiglia and Leo Brouwer. He holds a Bachelor of Arts degree from the University of Puerto Rico, and a "Profesor Superior de Guitarra" degree from "Oscar Esplá" Conservatory in Alicante, Spain.

== Academic life ==
He's been since 1988 in the faculty of the Puerto Rico Conservatory of Music, Luis Enrique Juliá is now full Professor of Classical Guitar and Chair of the Strings Department. Among his most recognized pupils, guitarist-composer Hermelindo Ruiz Mestre, after graduating with a Bachelor of Music degree under his guidance, pursued graduate studies in Yale University, where he obtained a Master of Music degree in May 2012, and a Performance Diploma a year later. Dr. Isaac Lausell, also a student of maestro Juliá, is currently in the faculty of Southern Illinois University at Carbondale, teaching both classic and jazz guitar, and has published four books. Dr. Lausell obtained a Master of Music degree from the University of North Texas and a Doctor of Musical Arts degree from SUNY Stonybrook.

== Performances ==
Luis Enrique Juliá has appeared in concerts, lectures, recitals, radio and television in the United States, Spain, Italy, France, Mexico, Colombia, Venezuela, and throughout the Caribbean. His interest in interdisciplinary exploration has led him to collaborate with such artists as baritone Justino Díaz, violinist Henry Hutchinson Negrón, Argentinean actress Norma Aleandro, Cuban filmmaker Enrique Pineda Barnet, painter Rafael Trelles, literary critic Mercedes López-Baralt, and most recently with jazz legendary double-bassist Eddie Gomez.

== Multimedia ==
TV Interview: Entrevista de Noticentro 4 al Prof. Luis Enrique Juliá
