= Humacao, Puerto Rico =

City and municipality in Puerto Rico

Humacao Municipio Autónomo de Humacao
- City and Municipality
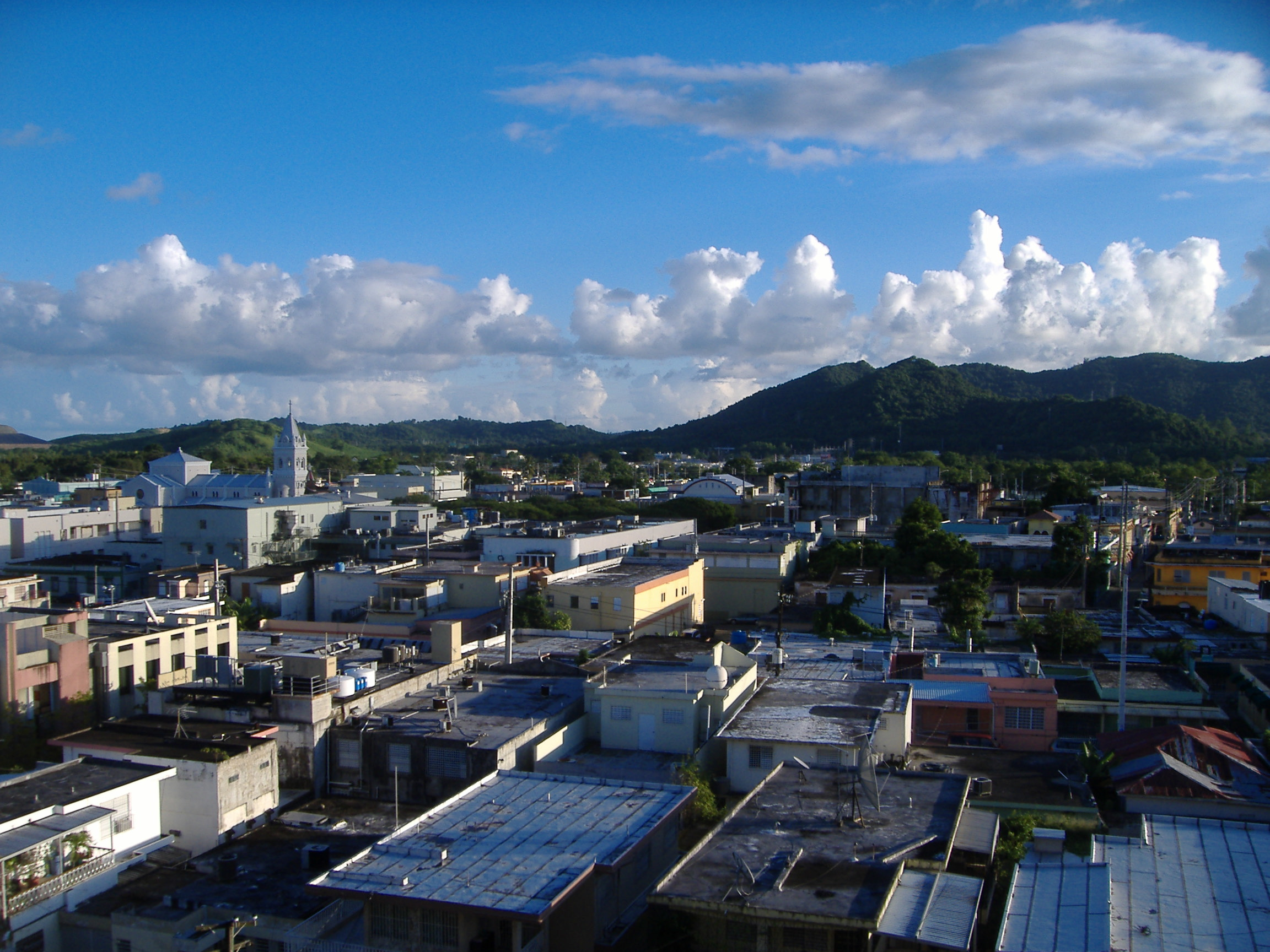
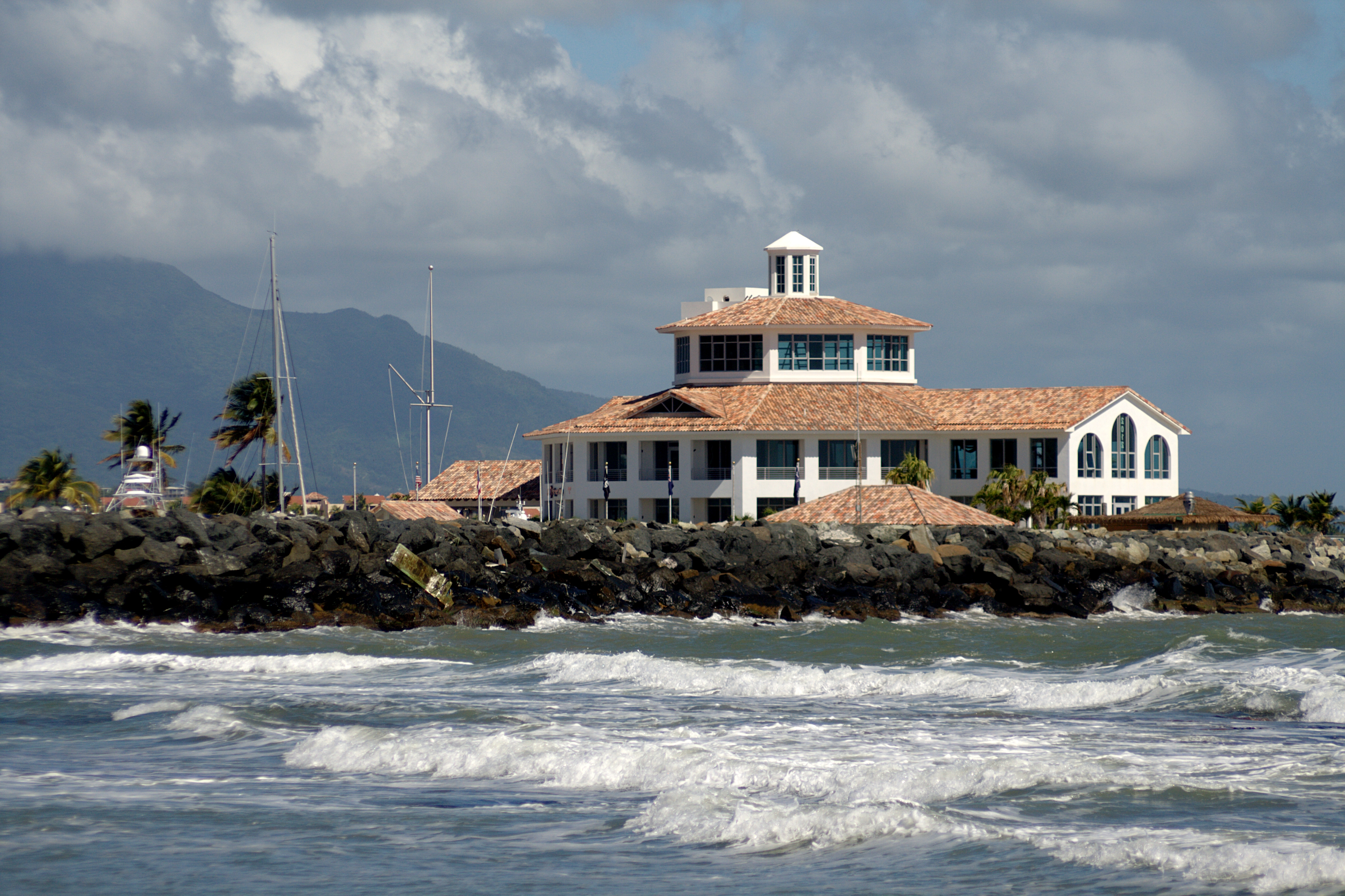
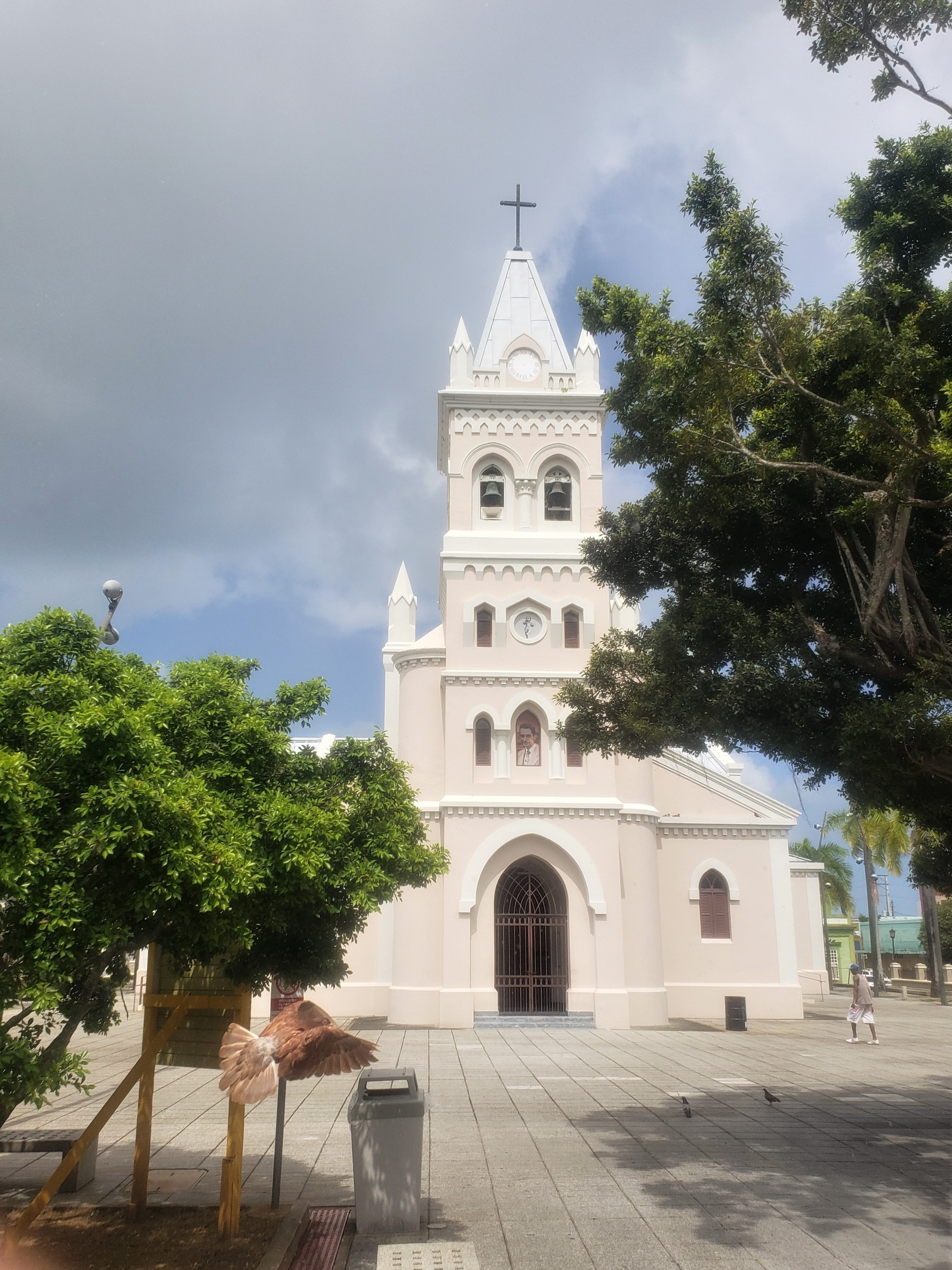
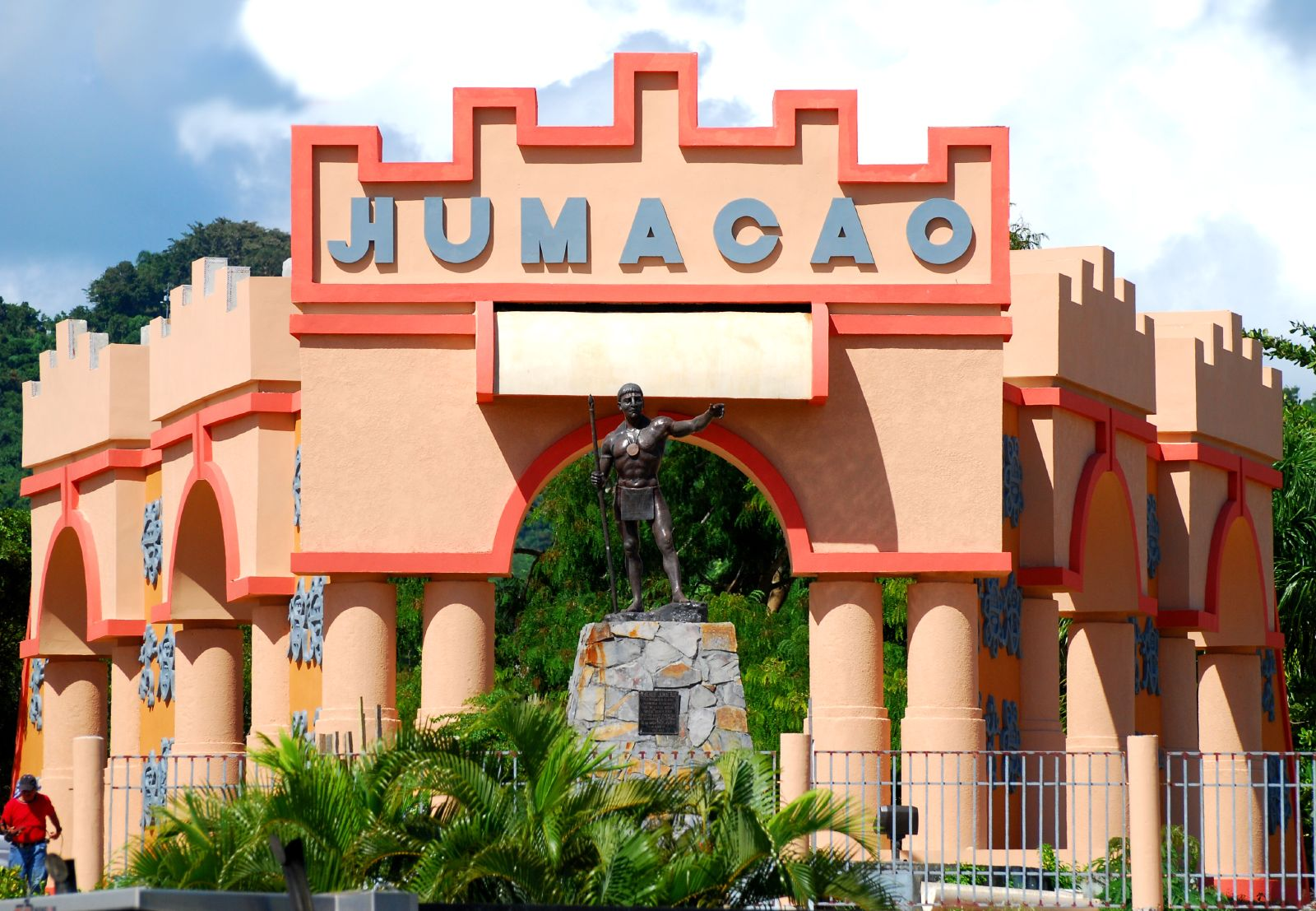
- From top, left to right: Downtown Humacao from the city hall; Palmas del Mar; Humacao Co-Cathedral; and the Humacao Monument

- Flag Coat of arms
- Nicknames: "La Perla del Oriente", "La Ciudad Gris", "Roye Huesos"
- Anthem: "Humacao, Hijo del Taíno Bravío"
- Map of Puerto Rico highlighting Humacao Municipality
- Coordinates: 18°08′59″N 65°49′39″W
- Country: Puerto Rico
- Department: Humacao Department
- European settlement: 16th century
- Founded: April 5, 1722
- Named for: Humaka
- Barrios: 13 barrios: Antón Ruíz; Buena Vista; Candelero Abajo; Candelero Arriba; Cataño; Collores; Humacao barrio-pueblo; Mabú; Mambiche; Mariana; Punta Santiago; Río Abajo; Tejas

Government
  - Mayor: Rosamar Trujillo Plumey (PPD)
  - Senatorial dist.: 7 – Humacao
  - Representative dist.: 35

Area
  - Total: 55.46 sq mi (143.63 km^{2})
  - Land: 45 sq mi (117 km^{2})
  - Water: 10.28 sq mi (26.63 km^{2})

Population (2020)
  - Total: 50,896
  - Estimate (2025): 49,249 ▼
  - Rank: 14th in Puerto Rico
  - Density: 1,130/sq mi (435/km^{2})
  - Racial groups (2000 Census): 69.7% White; 12.9% Black; 0.3% Asian
- Demonym: Humacaeños
- Time zone: UTC-4 (AST)
- ZIP Codes: 00791, 00792, 00741
- Area code: 787/939

Humacao (Spanish pronunciation: [umaˈkao]) is a city, municipality in Puerto Rico and capital of the department of the same name located in the eastern coast of the island, north of Yabucoa; south of Naguabo; east of Las Piedras; and west of Vieques. Humacao is spread over 12 barrios and Humacao Pueblo (the downtown area and the administrative center of the city). It is part of the San Juan-Caguas-Guaynabo Metropolitan Statistical Area.

== History ==
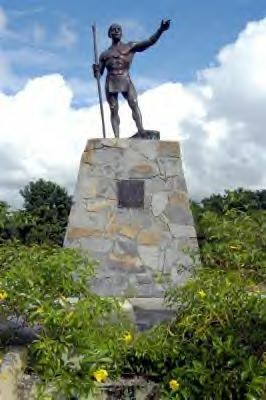
Statue of Cacique Jumacao

The region of what became Humacao belonged to the Taíno region of Humaka, which covered a portion of the southeast coast of Puerto Rico. The region was led by cacique Jumacao (also referred to as "Macao"). The Taíno settlement was located on the shores of what became the Humacao River. It is believed that the Taíno chief Jumacao was the first "cacique" to learn to read and write in Spanish, since he wrote a letter to the King of Spain Charles I complaining about how the Governor of the island wasn't complying with their peace agreement. In the letter, Jumacao argued that their people were virtually prisoners of Spain. It is said that King Charles was so moved by the letter that he ordered the Governor to obey the terms of the treaty.

During the early 16th century, the region was populated by cattle ranchers. However, since most of them officially resided in San Juan, a settlement was never officially organized. At the beginning of the 18th century, specifically around 1721–1722, the first official settlement was constituted in the area. Most of the residents at the time were immigrants from the Canary Islands, but due to attacks from Caribs, pirates, and other settlers, some of them moved farther into the island in what became Las Piedras. Still, some settlers remained and by 1776, historian Fray Íñigo Abbad y Lasierra visited the area and wrote about the population there. By 1793, the church was recognized as parish and the settlement was officially recognized as town.

By 1894, Humacao was recognized as a city. Due to its thriving population, buildings and structures like a hospital, a theater, and a prison were built in the city. In 1899, after the United States invasion of the island as a result of the Spanish–American War, the municipality of Las Piedras was annexed to Humacao. This lasted until 1914, when the Legislative Assembly of Puerto Rico voted on splitting both towns again.

Puerto Rico was ceded by Spain in the aftermath of the Spanish–American War under the terms of the Treaty of Paris of 1898 and became a territory of the United States. In 1899, the United States Department of War conducted a census of Puerto Rico finding that the population of Humacao was 14,313.

In March 2008, a new Roman Catholic diocese was established as the Fajardo-Humacao diocese. Its first bishop is Monsignor Eusebio 'Chebito' Ramos Morales, a maunabeño who was rector of the Humacao's main parish in the 1990s.

On September 20, 2017 Hurricane Maria struck Puerto Rico. Punta Santiago in Humacao saw a six-foot storm surge. The hurricane caused destruction of homes and infrastructure.

== Geography ==
Humacao is located in the southeast coast of Puerto Rico. It is bordered by the municipalities of Naguabo to the north, Yabucoa to the south, and Las Piedras to the west. The Atlantic Ocean borders the city in the east. Humacao is located in the region of the Eastern Coastal Plains, with most of its territory being flat. There are minor elevations to the southwest, like Candelero Hill, and northwest, like Mabú. Humacao's territory covers 45 square miles (117 km^{2}). Two islands belong to Humacao: Cayo Santiago and Cayo Batata.

=== Water features ===
Humacao's hydrographic system consists of many rivers and creeks like Humacao, Antón Ruíz, and Candelero. Some of its creeks are Frontera, Mariana, and Del Obispo, among many others.

In 2019, updated flood zone maps show that Humacao is extremely vulnerable to flooding, along with Toa Baja, Rincón, Barceloneta, and Corozal. Located where most cyclones enter the island, Humacao is one of the most vulnerable areas of Puerto Rico. Humacao was working on flood mitigation plans and shared that its barrios located on the coast; Antón Ruíz, Punta Santiago, Río Abajo, Buena Vista and Candelero Abajo barrios, are extremely vulnerable to flooding and destruction.

=== Barrios ===
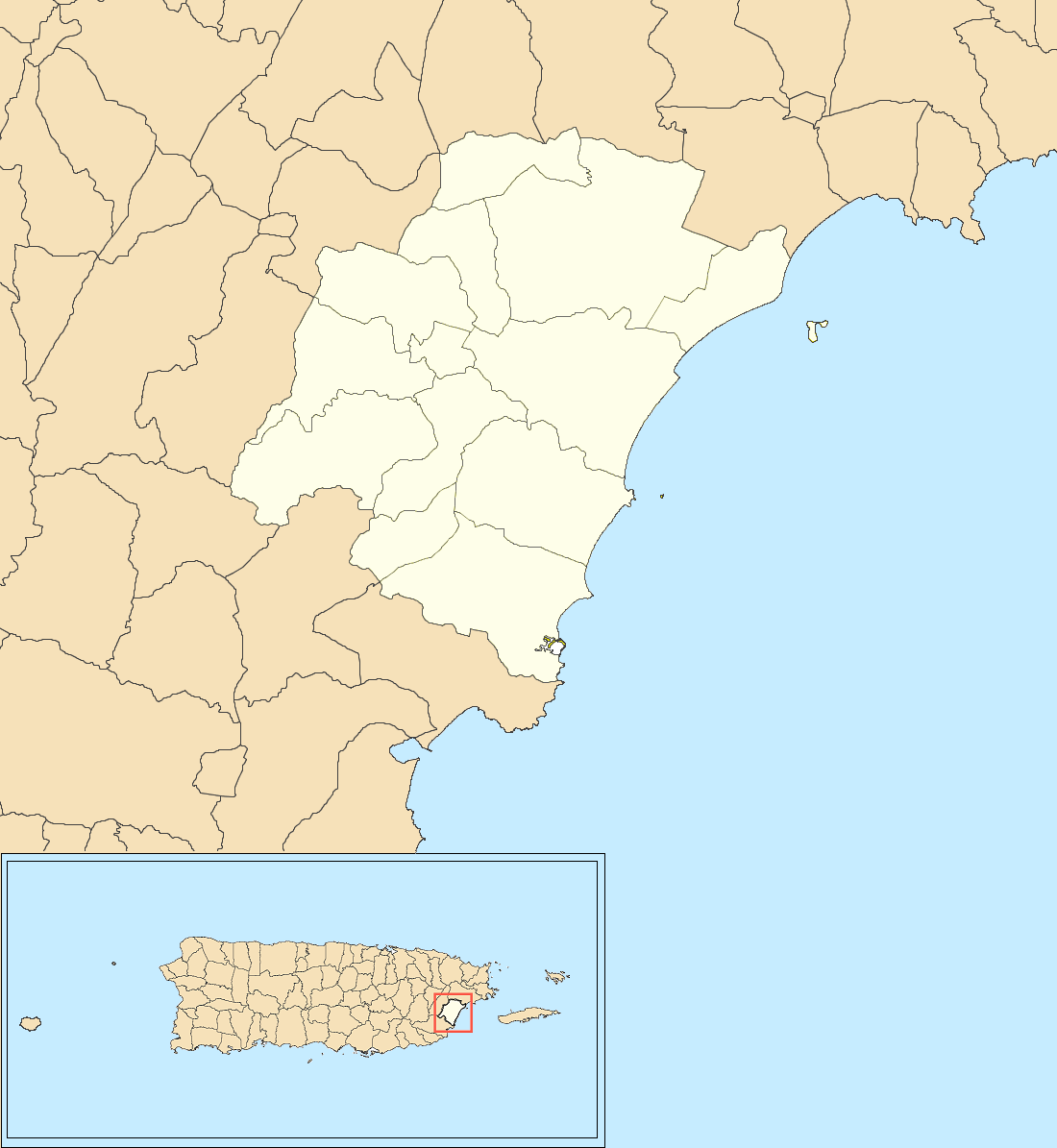
Humacao map with barrio subdivisions

Like all municipalities of Puerto Rico, Humacao is subdivided into barrios. The municipal buildings, central square and large Catholic church are located in a small barrio referred to as "el pueblo", near the center of the municipality.

1. Antón Ruíz
2. Buena Vista
3. Candelero Abajo
4. Candelero Arriba
5. Cataño
6. Collores
7. Humacao barrio-pueblo
8. Mabú
9. Mambiche
10. Mariana
11. Punta Santiago
12. Río Abajo
13. Tejas

=== Sectors ===
Barrios (which are, in contemporary times, roughly comparable to minor civil divisions) and subbarrios, are further subdivided into smaller areas called sectores (sectors in English). The types of sectores may vary, from normally sector to urbanización to reparto to barriada to residencial, among others.

=== Special Communities ===
Comunidades Especiales de Puerto Rico (Special Communities of Puerto Rico) are marginalized communities whose citizens are experiencing a certain amount of social exclusion. A map shows these communities occur in nearly every municipality of the commonwealth. Of the 742 places that were on the list in 2014, the following barrios, communities, sectors, or neighborhoods were in Humacao: Antón Ruiz, Obrera neighborhood, Cotto Mabú-Fermina, Buena Vista, Parcelas Aniseto Cruz in Candelero Abajo, Parcelas Martínez in Candelero Abajo, Cataño, Punta Santiago, Verde Mar, and Cangrejos.

== Demographics ==
Historical population
Census	Pop.	Note	%±
1900	14,313		—
1910	26,678		86.4%
1920	20,229		−24.2%
1930	25,466		25.9%
1940	29,833		17.1%
1950	34,853		16.8%
1960	33,381		−4.2%
1970	36,023		7.9%
1980	46,134		28.1%
1990	55,203		19.7%
2000	59,035		6.9%
2010	58,466		−1.0%
2020	50,896		−12.9%
2025 (est.)	49,249	▼	−3.2%
U.S. Decennial Census; 1899 (shown as 1900) 1910–1930; 1930–1950 1960–2000 2010 2020

== Tourism ==
To stimulate local tourism, the Puerto Rico Tourism Company launched the Voy Turistiendo ("I'm Touring") campaign, with a passport book and website. The Humacao page lists Reserva Natural de Humacao, its Pueblo with historic architecture, and its cuisine, specifically Granito, as places and things of interest.

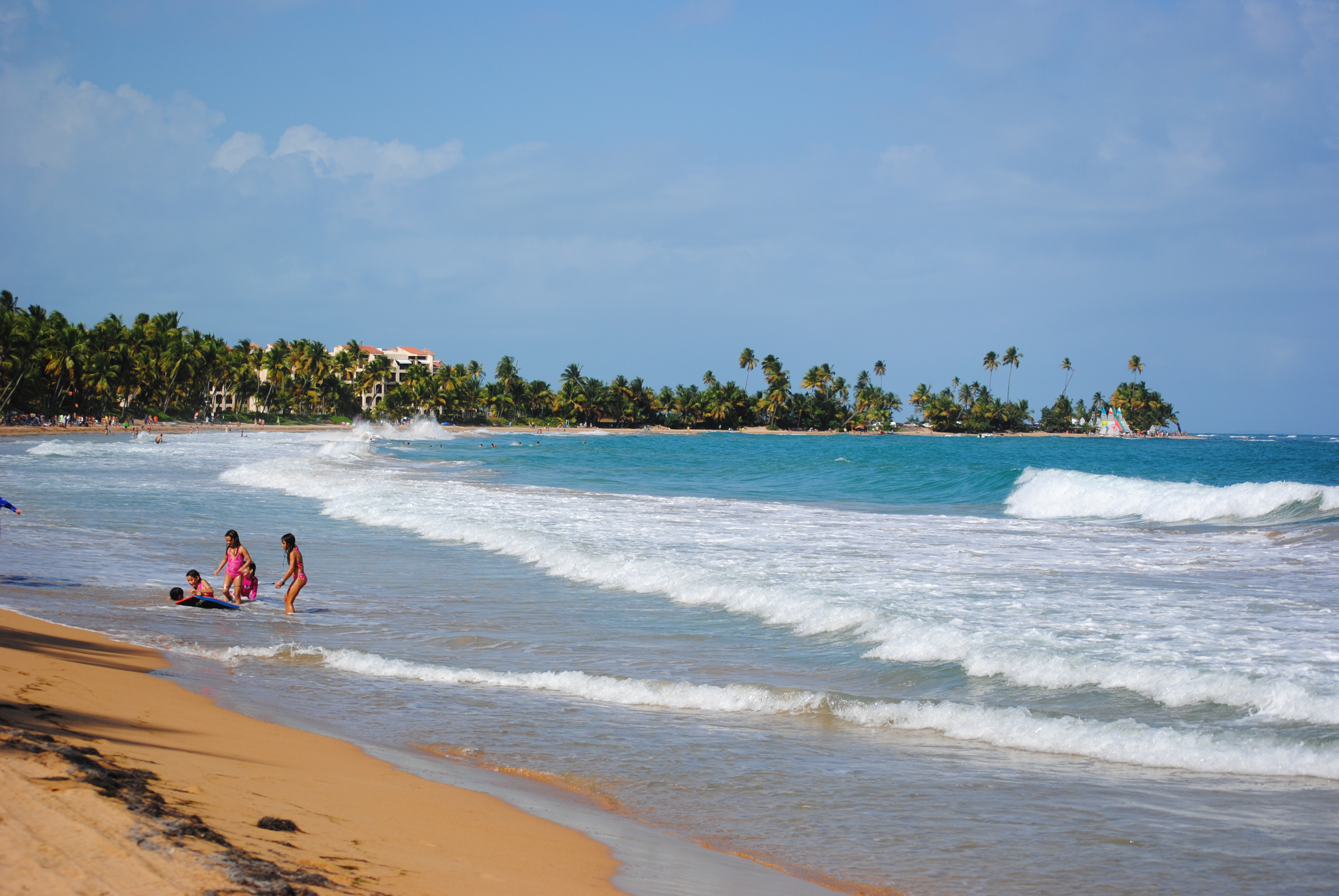
The beach at Palmas del Mar resort

According to a news article by Primera Hora, there are 8 beaches in Humacao including Punta Santiago. Palmas del Mar Beach in Humacao is considered a dangerous beach due to its strong currents.

Due to its location on the coast and relative short distance from the capital, Humacao is a frequent stop for tourists. One of the most notable tourist mainstays is the Palmas del Mar resort, which is Puerto Rico's largest resort. This mega-resort is composed of over 3,000 acres (12 km^{2}) of land and occupies the entire southeastern portion of Humacao. The resort contains tennis courts, two world-class golf courses, beach access, several restaurants and a riding center.

Aside from the beaches at the Palmas del Mar resort, Humacao has other beaches. The most popular ones are Punta Santiago, Buena Vista, Punta Candelero, and El Morrillo. The Candelero Beach Resort, built in 1973, with its 107 rooms, 25 which are suites, was purchased and revitalized by the Suarez family.

The Astronomical Observatory at the University of Puerto Rico at Humacao, Casa Roig, the Guzmán Ermit, the Humacao Wildlife Refuge, and the Church Dulce Nombre de Jesús may be classed as other places of interest.

In the 1980s, the Puerto Rico Department of Natural and Environmental Resources established the Humacao Nature Reserve (also called the Punta Santiago Nature Reserve) in the municipality. The Palmas del Mar Tropical Forest is also located in Humacao.

== Economy ==
Burlington in Humacao employs under 100 people and reopened its doors in March 2019. The store had been shuttered since Hurricane Maria destroyed it on September 19, 2017.

== Culture ==
=== Festivals and events ===
Humacao celebrates its patron saint festival in December. The Fiestas Patronales Inmaculada Concepcion de Maria is a religious and cultural celebration that generally features parades, games, artisans, amusement rides, regional food, and live entertainment.

The Breadfruit Festival (Festival de la Pana) is celebrated during the first weekend of September. It is organized by the Mariana's Recreational and Cultural Association (ARECMA), a community organization of the Mariana barrio. Its main theme is about the preparation of dishes whose main ingredient is breadfruit. Typical Puerto Rican music, crafts and foods as well as other cultural and sports activities can also be enjoyed. Most years it has been held at one of the highest elevations within the sector with views to Humacao, Las Piedras, Naguabo, Vieques and Yabucoa.

Humacao Grita is an urban art festival held in November.

Other festivals and events celebrated in Humacao include:

- Three Kings’ Day- January
- Festival of the Cross – May
- Flat-bottom Boat Festival – June
- Saint Cecilia Festival (patron saint of musicians) – November
- Catholic Church Community Festival – December

=== Sports ===
The Grises basketball team (Humacao Grays), founded in 2005, belongs to Puerto Rico's National Superior Basketball league. In 2010, they changed their name to the Caciques de Humacao. They play at the new Humacao Coliseum.

The Grises is also a Double A class amateur baseball team that has won one championship (1951) and four time runners-up in (1950, 1960, 1965 and 1967).

== Government ==
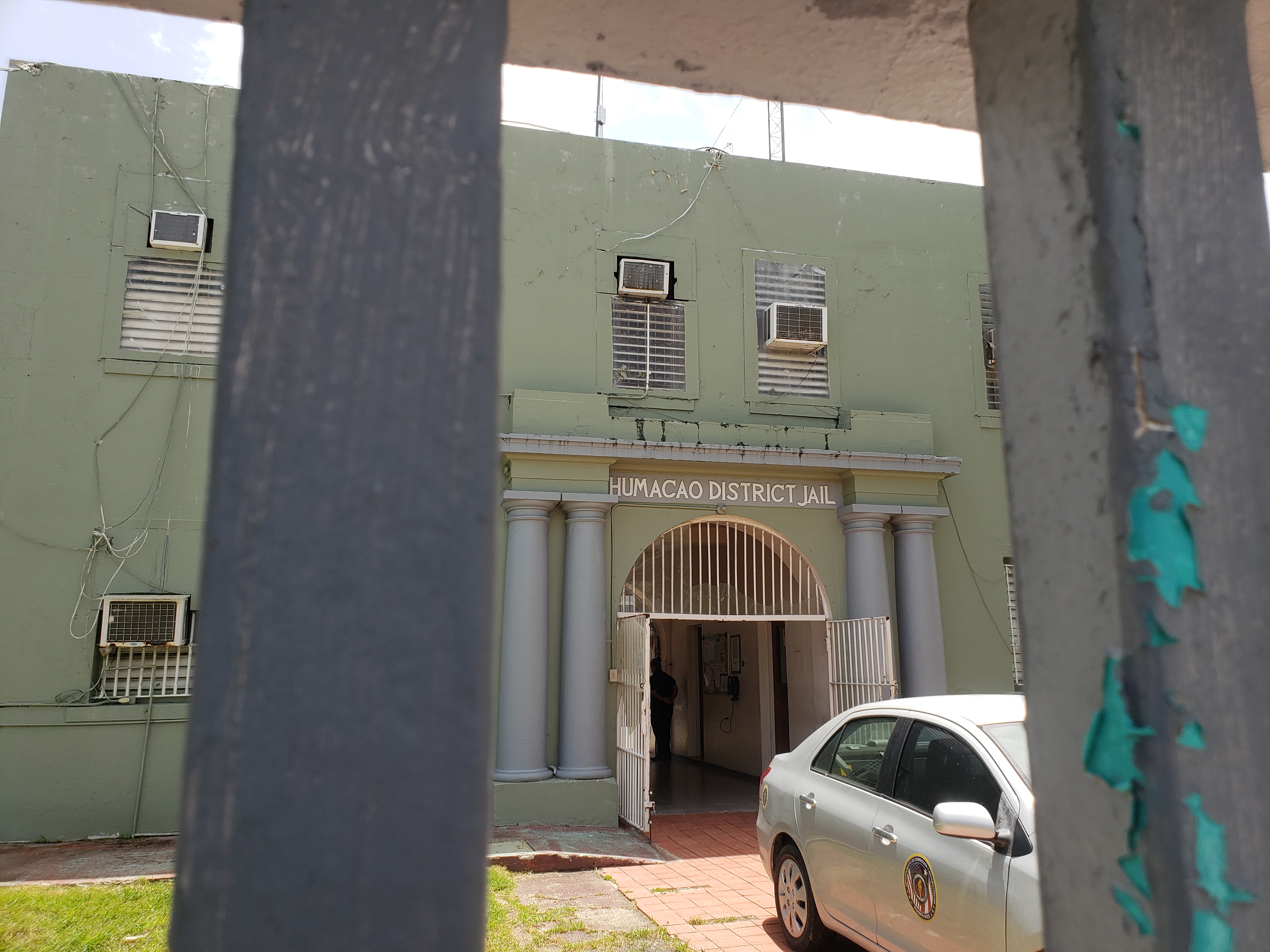
Humacao District Jail

All municipalities in Puerto Rico are administered by a mayor, elected every four years. The mayor of Humacao is former Senator Rosamar Trujillo Plumey, of the Popular Democratic Party (PPD). She was first elected at the 2024 general elections. Trujillo Plumey is the daughter of Marcelo Trujillo, a former mayor of Humacao from 2001 until his death in 2019.

In 2019, Luis Raul Sanchez became interim mayor of Humacao after Marcelo Trujillo Panisse died in September 2019.

The city belongs to the Puerto Rico Senatorial district VII, which is represented by two Senators. In 2024, Wanda Soto Tolentino and Luis Daniel Colón La Santa were elected as District Senators.

=== FBI satellite office ===
There is an FBI satellite office located in Humacao.

== Healthcare ==
Humacao has three secondary care hospitals HIMA-San Pablo Humacao, Menonita (Hospital Oriente), and Ryder Memorial Hospital.

== Symbols ==
The municipio has an official flag and coat of arms.

=== Flag ===
It consists of three horizontal stripes: gold that stands for Chief Jumacao's crown, red that symbolizes the coat of arms and the green that represents the arrows used by the Taínos.

=== Coat of arms ===
The coat of arms mainly consists of two colors, gold and green but also has gules. The gold represents the sun, Humacao is located in the island were the sun rises. Green symbolizes the native Indian heritage as well as the natural tropical valley where the city is located. The shield itself represents Humacao's native and Indian name origin. The coat of arms was designed by Roberto Brascochea Lota in 1975 and approved by Humacao on November 13, 1975.

== Transportation ==
Humacao's airport is no longer used for daily flights to Vieques and Culebra as it was in the past. It is used for private flights.

Humacao is served by two freeways and one tolled expressway, therefore is one of a few cities in Puerto Rico with good access. Puerto Rico Highway 30, Autopista Cruz Ortiz Stella, serves as the main highway coming from the west (Caguas, Las Piedras), while Puerto Rico Highway 53 serves from the north (Fajardo, Naguabo) and south (Yabucoa). Puerto Rico Highway 60, the Carretera Dionisio Casillas, is a short freeway located entirely in Humacao, and has exits serving downtown Humacao and Anton Ruiz.

Puerto Rico Highway 3, the main highway bordering the east coastline of Puerto Rico from San Juan, passes through Humacao and has its only alt route in the town, known locally as the Bulevar del Rio (River Boulevard) where it has access to the main judiciary center of the city, as well as a future theatre that is being built, the Centro de Bellas Artes de Humacao (Humacao Fine Arts Center). The alt route allows people to pass by the downtown area, as PR-3 enters into the downtown and business center of the town.

Puerto Rico Highway 908 is another important highway, which begins at PR-3 and intersects PR-30 and has access to the University of Puerto Rico at Humacao, as well as some main schools in the municipality.

Humacao, together with San Juan and Salinas, is one of three municipalities in Puerto Rico that has controlled-access highways leaving its boundaries in all directions (in this case north to Naguabo and south to Yabucoa via PR-53 and west to Las Piedras via PR-30)

There are 68 bridges in Humacao.

== Education ==
There are various elementary and high school facilities, three of which were recognized by the Middle States Association of Secondary Schools and each has its own National Honor Society chapters. These include Colegio San Antonio Abad, founded in 1957 and operated by the Benedictine monks of the Abadía San Antonio Abad.

The University of Puerto Rico at Humacao, formerly the CUH, educates over 4,000 students and is well known for its sciences, producing many of the island's most skilled microbiologists, marine biologists, wildlife biologists and chemists at the undergraduate level. It also manages an astronomical observatory where many tourists and locals come visit and view the stars and planets and the Museo Casa Roig where arts expositions and cultural events are celebrated.

== Natives and residents ==
- Rita Moreno, Academy Award-winning actress
- Edwin Núñez, professional baseball player
- Luis Rafael Sánchez, novelist and author
- Rossana Rodriguez-Sanchez, member of the Chicago City Council
- Eddie Miró, TV personality
- Julio M. Fuentes, US Circuit Court judge
- Tito Rojas, salsa singer
- Adamari López, actress
- Jaquira Díaz, author, journalist
- Cosculluela, rapper, songwriter
- Eladio Carrión, rapper, songwriter
- Jumacao, Taino Cacique
- Benito Pastoriza Iyodo, poet, narrator, and essayist
- Carlos Ponce, actor
- Luis Antonio "Yoyo Boing" Rivera, actor and comedian
- Diplo, comedian
- Jerry Rivera, singer and dancer
- Junior Ortiz, former Major League Baseball player
- Raul Casanova, former Major League Baseball player
- Rafael Orellano, former professional baseball player
- Jantony Ortiz, professional boxer
- José Estrada Jr., former professional wrestler
- Ana Otero, Pianist, composer, arranger, conductor, activist.
- Jon Z, rapper, songwriter
- Luis Enrique Juliá, composer
- Yomo, rapper, singer

== Gallery ==
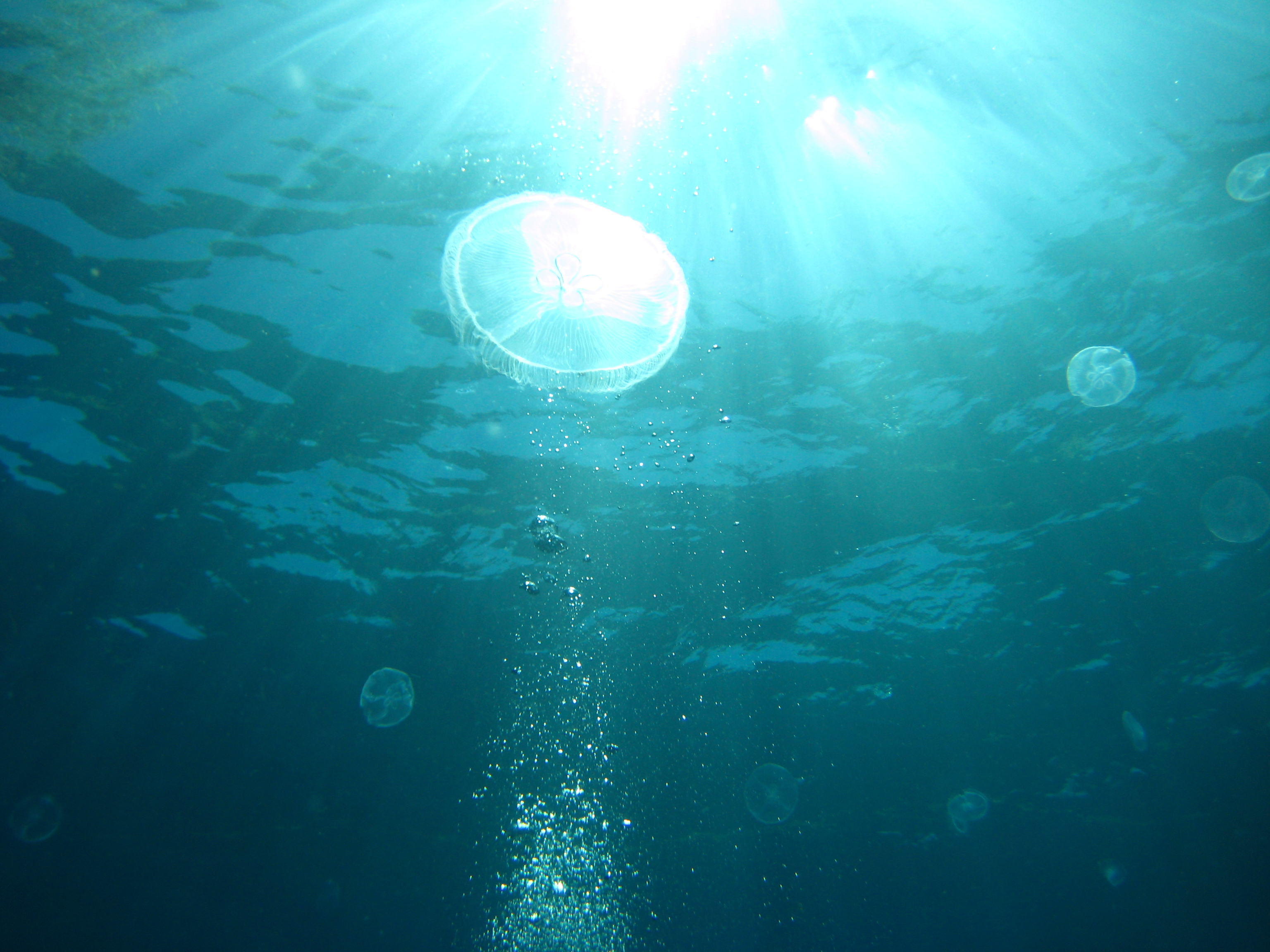
Moon jellyfish off the coast of Humacao

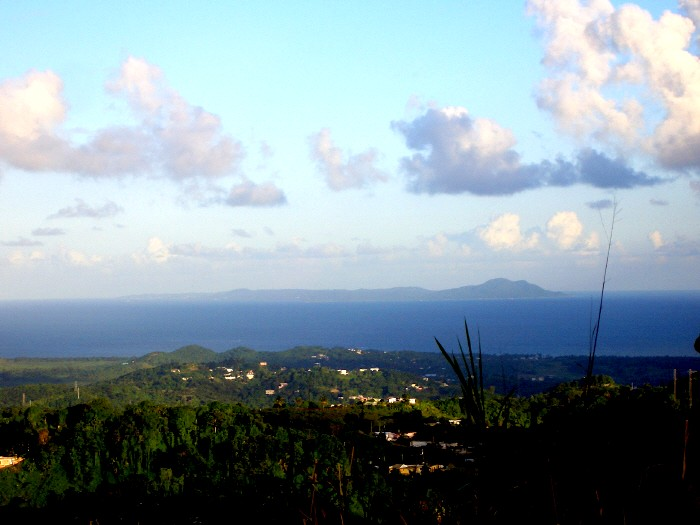
View of Vieques Island from Humacao

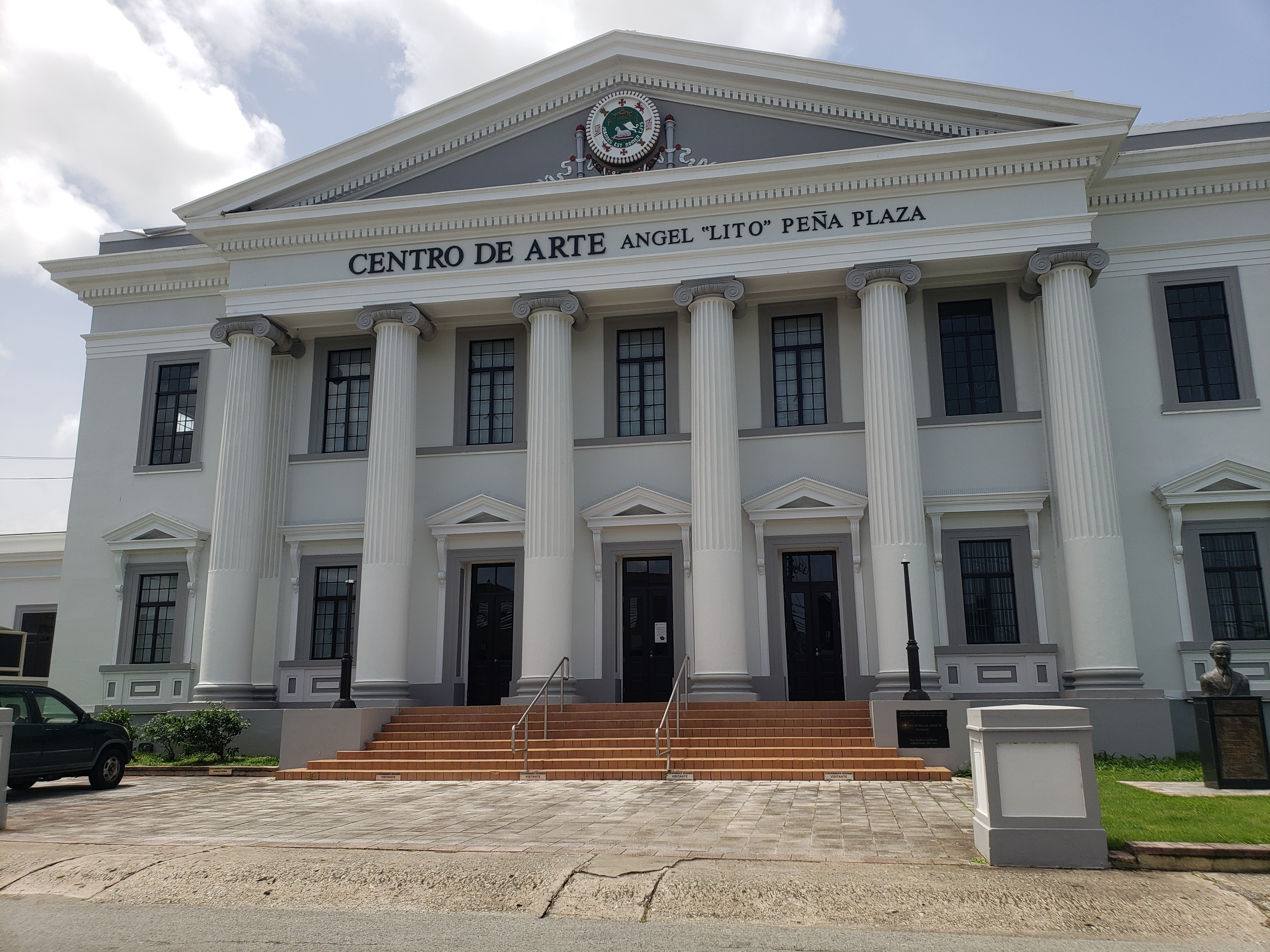
The Centro de Arte Angel "Lito" Peña Plaza in 2020, which used to be the Alcaldía or town hall of Humacao is on the US National Register of Historic Places.

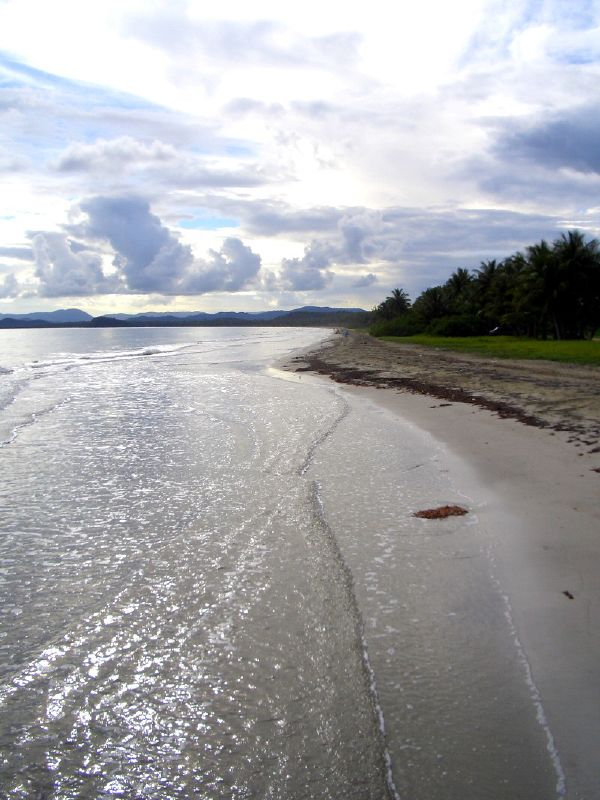
A beach in Humacao

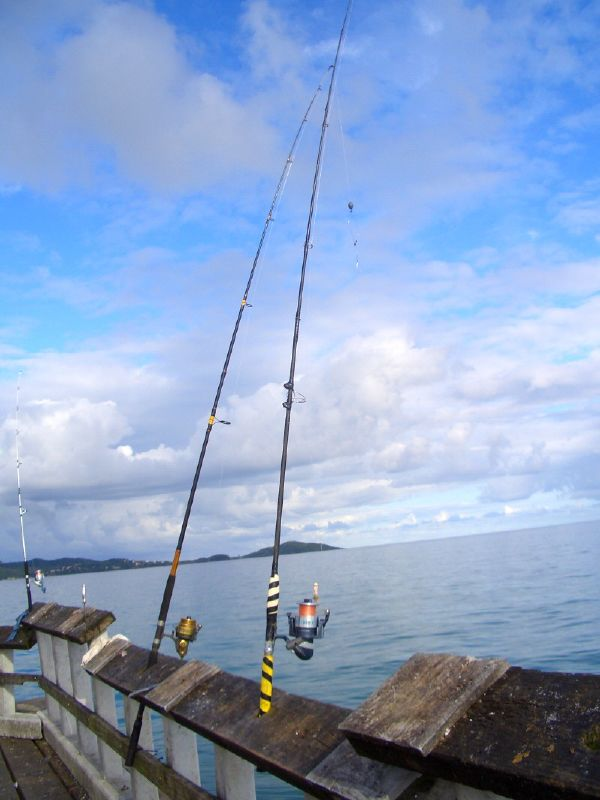
Fishing from a pier in Humacao

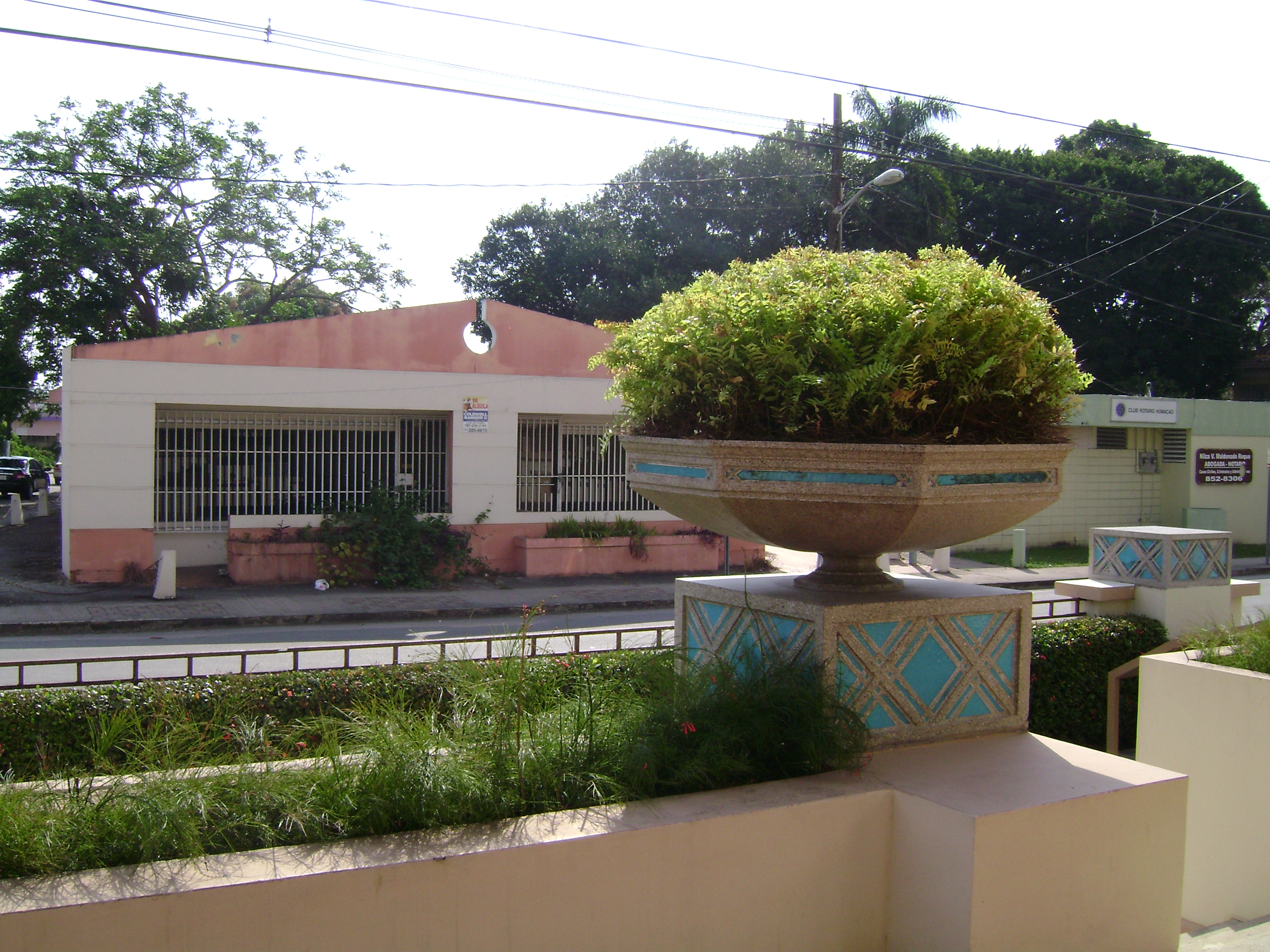
Large planter in Humacao barrio-pueblo

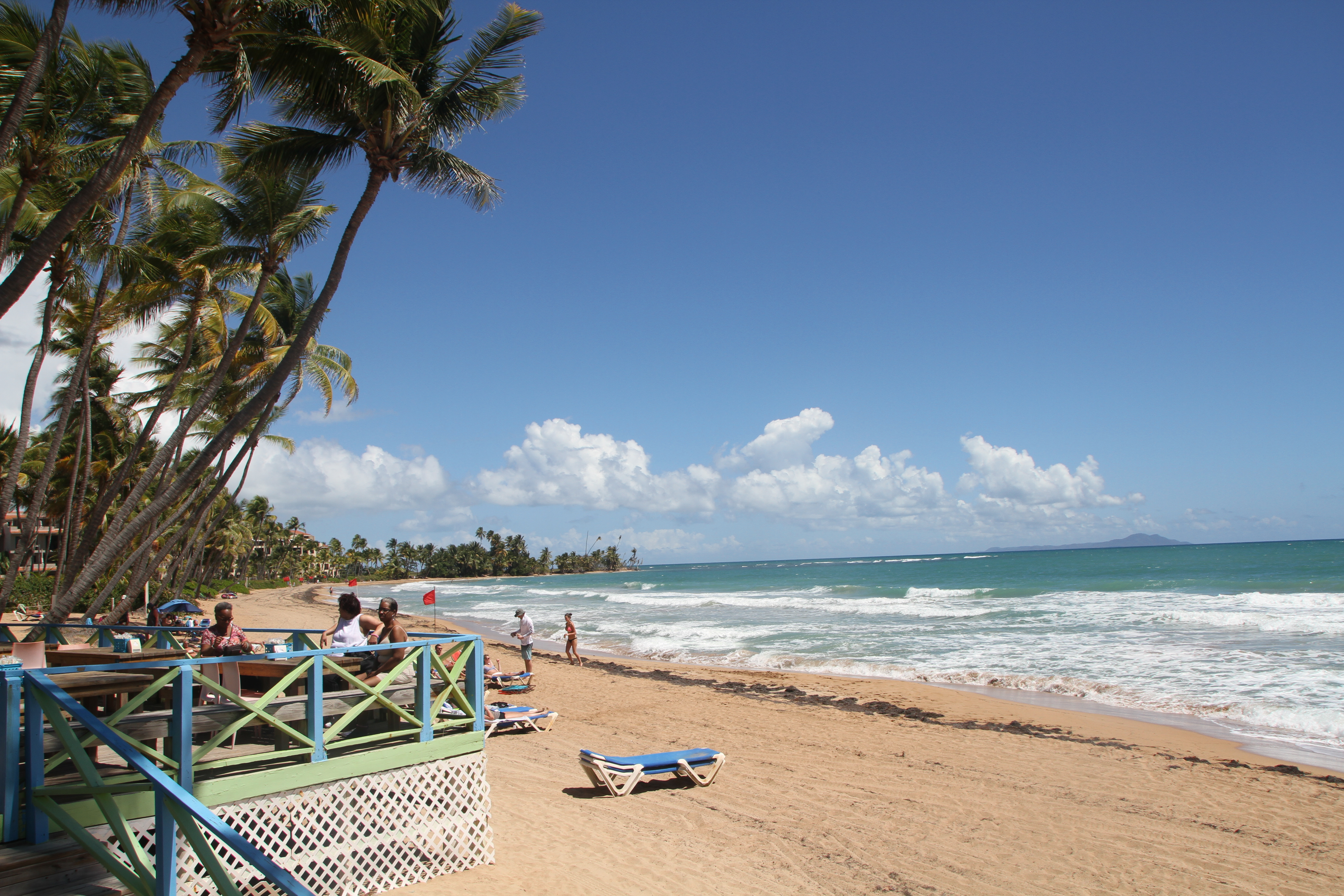
Palmas del Mar Beach

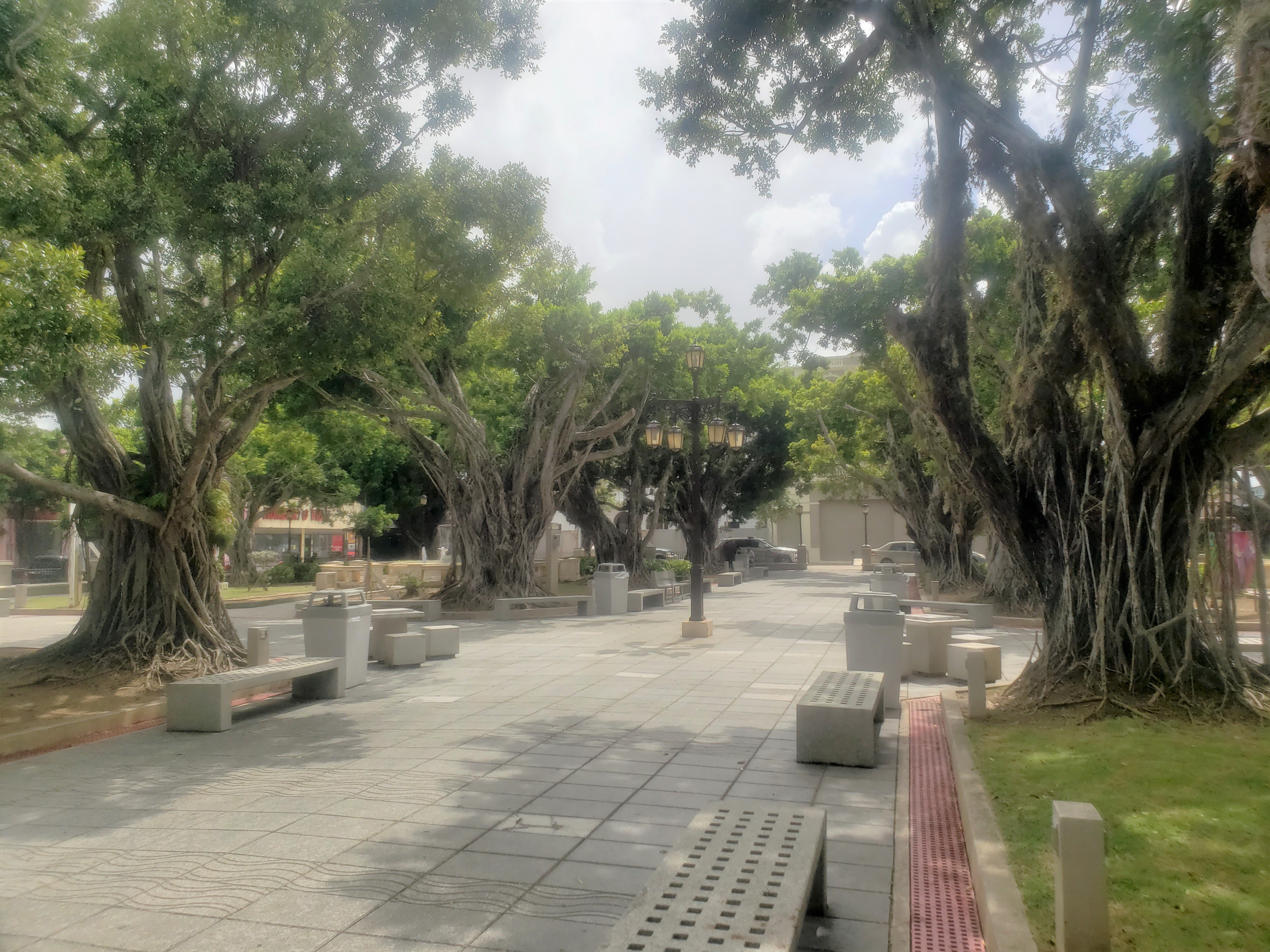
Square in the Pueblo of Humacao

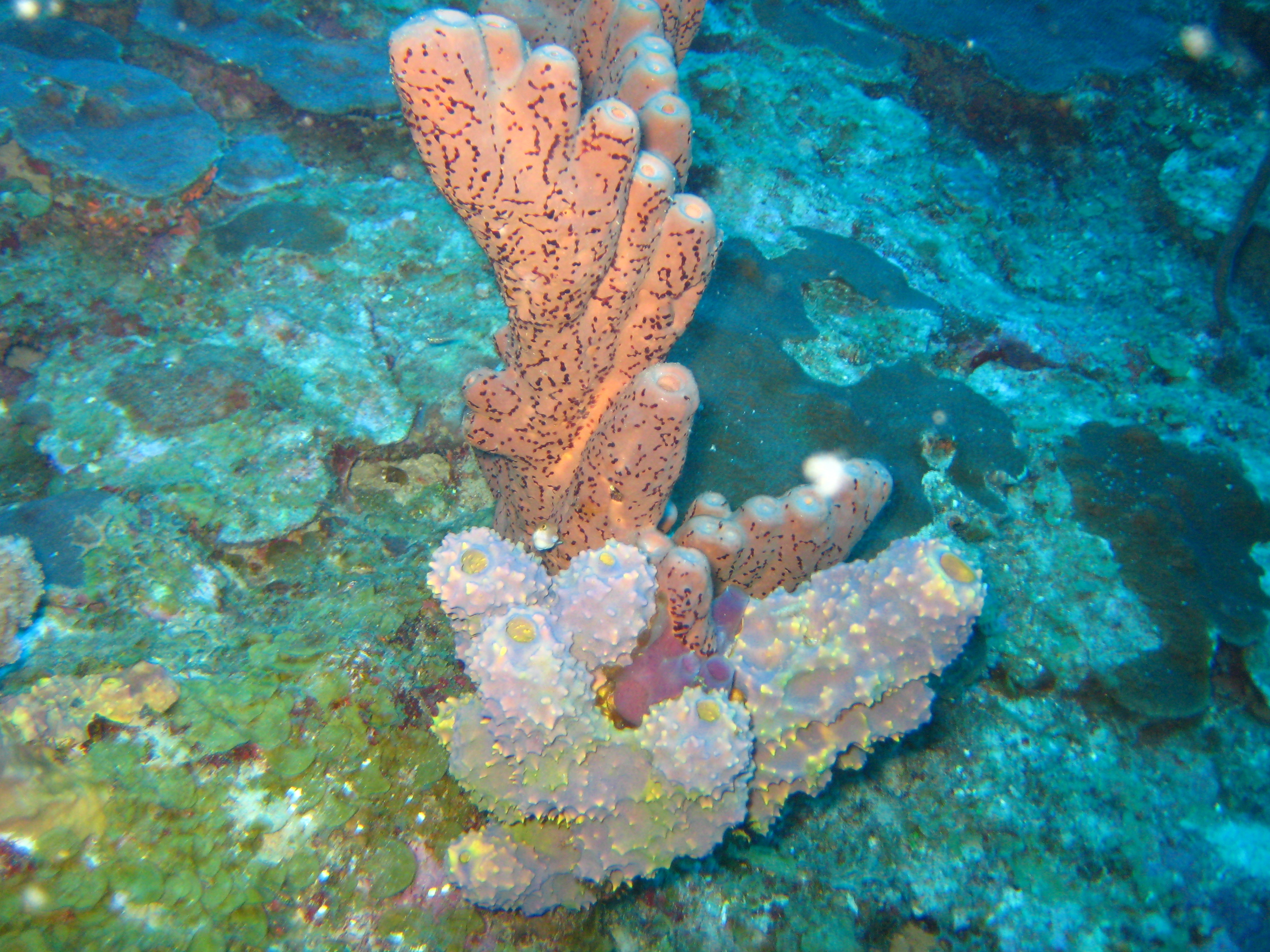
Underwater scene off the coast of Humacao

== See also ==
- List of Puerto Ricans
- History of Puerto Rico
- Did you know-Puerto Rico?
