= Mambiche =

Barrio of Humacao, Puerto Rico

- Barrio
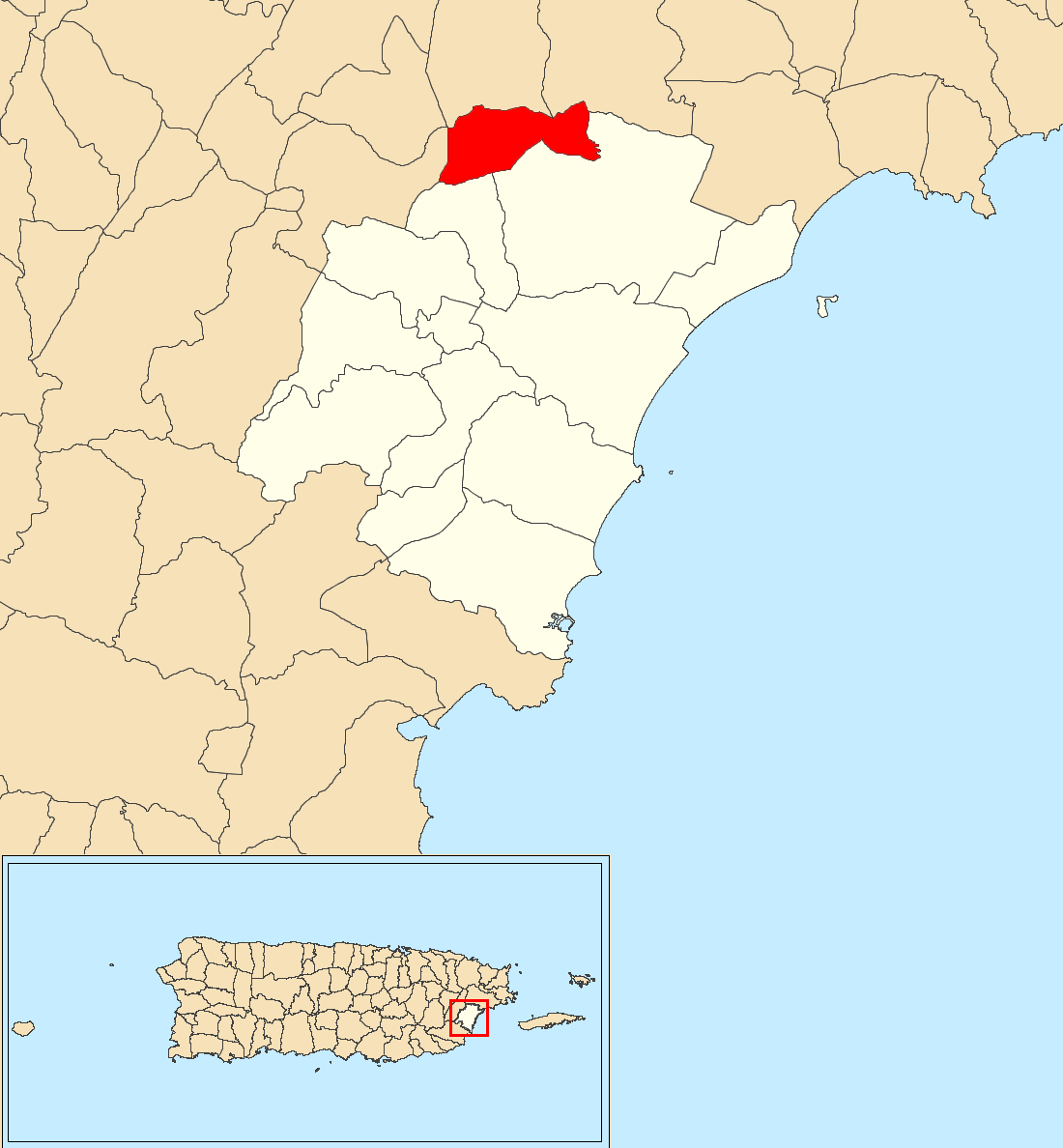
- Location of Mambiche within the municipality of Humacao shown in red

- Location of Puerto Rico
- Coordinates: 18°11′51″N 65°48′36″W
- Commonwealth: Puerto Rico
- Municipality: Humacao

Area
  - Total: 2.09 sq mi (5.4 km^{2})
  - Land: 2.09 sq mi (5.4 km^{2})
  - Water: 0 sq mi (0 km^{2})
- Elevation: 295 ft (90 m)

Population (2010)
  - Total: 2,387
  - Density: 1,147.6/sq mi (443.1/km^{2})
- Source: 2010 Census
- Time zone: UTC−4 (AST)
- ZIP Code: 00791

Mambiche is a barrio in the municipality of Humacao, Puerto Rico. Its population in 2010 was 2,387.

== History ==
Mambiche was in Spain's gazetteers until Puerto Rico was ceded by Spain in the aftermath of the Spanish–American War under the terms of the Treaty of Paris of 1898 and became an unincorporated territory of the United States. In 1899, the United States Department of War conducted a census of Puerto Rico finding that the population of Río Abajo and Mambiche barrios was 1,289.

Historical population
Census	Pop.	Note	%±
1910	826		—
1920	870		5.3%
1930	1,468		68.7%
1940	1,233		−16.0%
1950	1,260		2.2%
1960	1,295		2.8%
1970	1,231		−4.9%
1980	1,572		27.7%
1990	1,943		23.6%
2000	2,052		5.6%
2010	2,387		16.3%
U.S. Decennial Census; 1899 (shown as 1900) 1910-1930; 1930-1950 1980-2000 2010

== See also ==
- List of communities in Puerto Rico
