= Candelero Abajo =

Barrio of Humacao, Puerto Rico

- Barrio
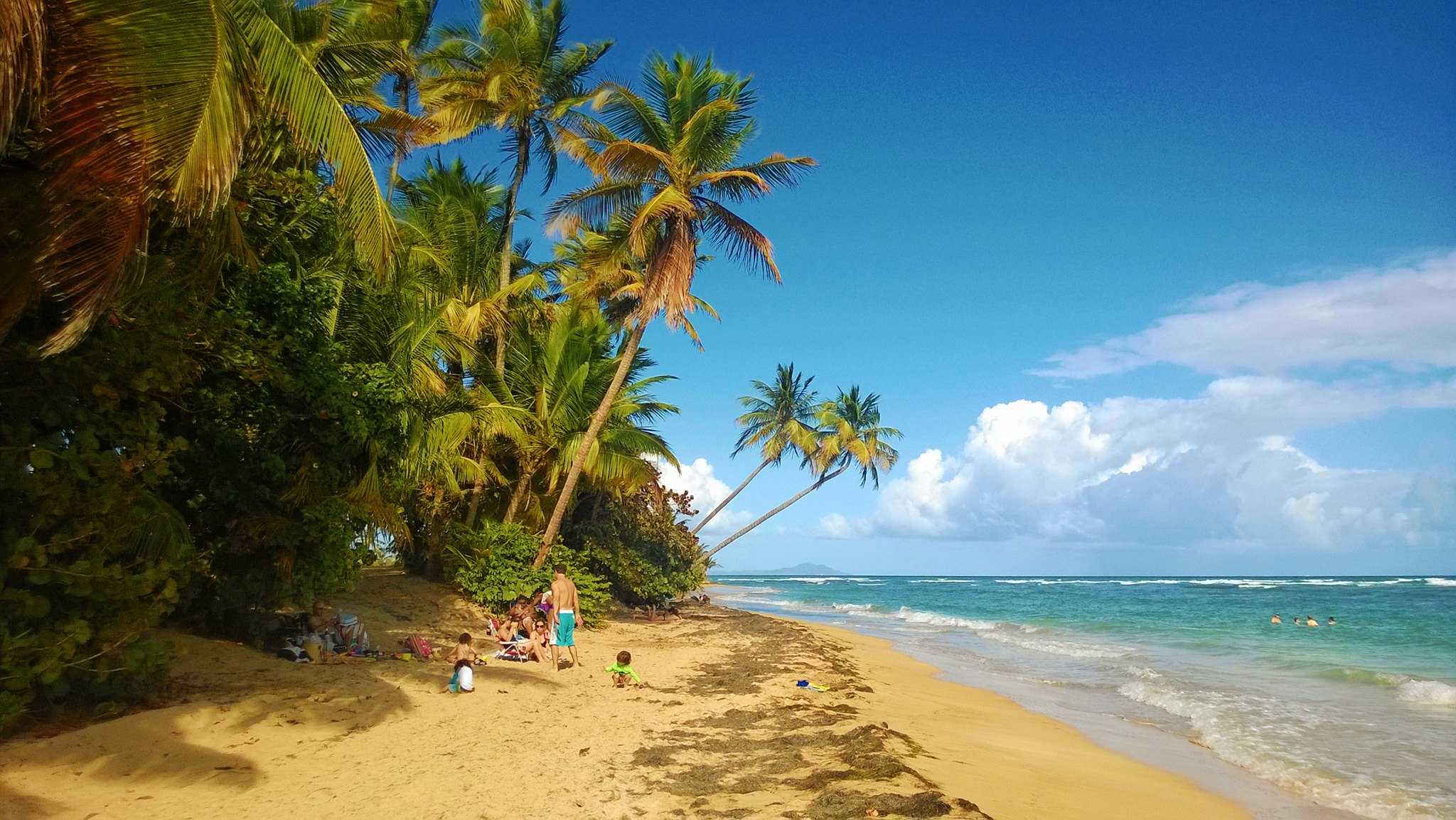
- Punta Candelero in Candelero Abajo

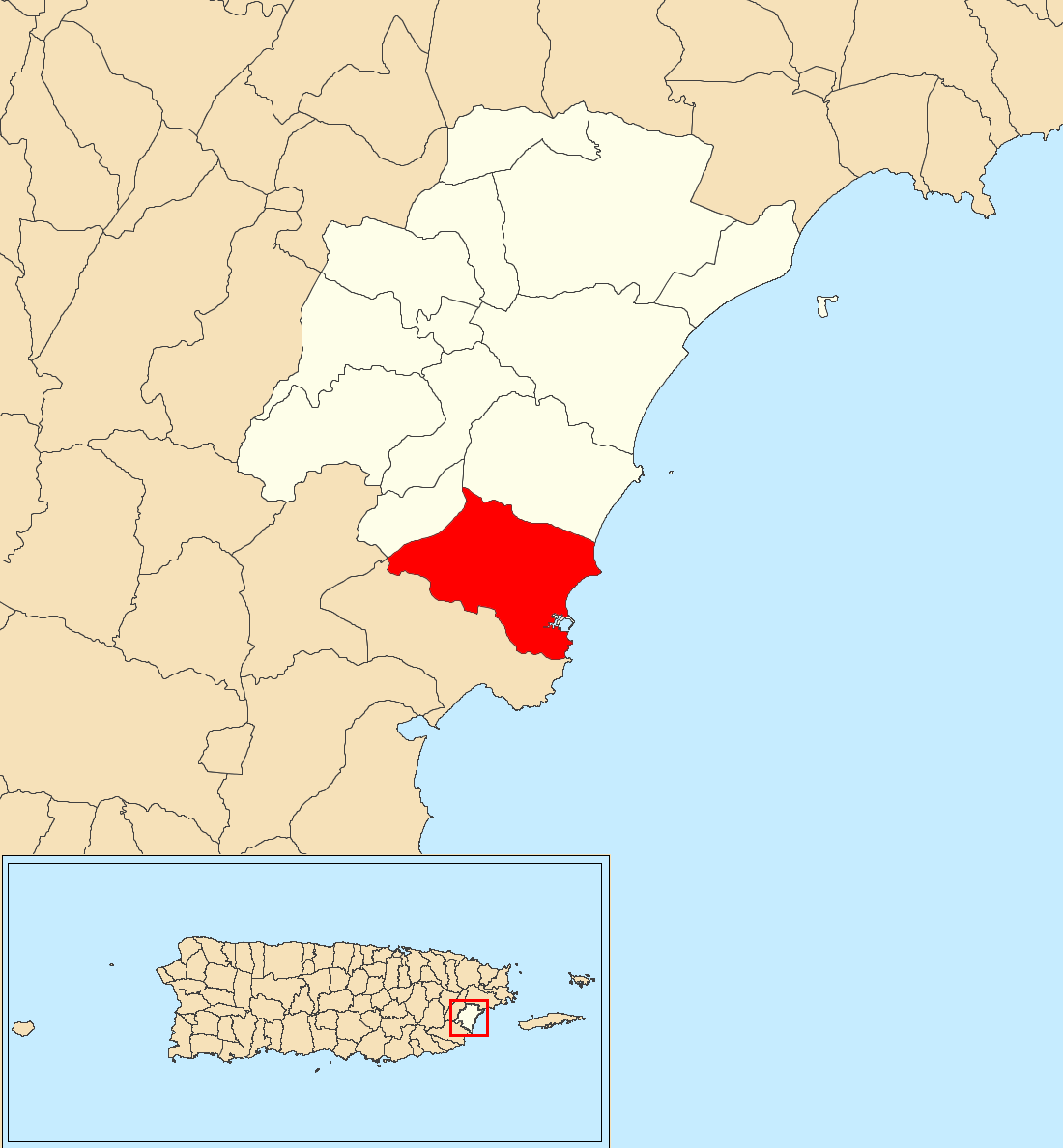
- Location of Candelero Abajo within the municipality of Humacao shown in red

- Location of Puerto Rico
- Coordinates: 18°05′25″N 65°48′36″W
- Commonwealth: Puerto Rico
- Municipality: Humacao

Area
  - Total: 5.80 sq mi (15.0 km^{2})
  - Land: 4.83 sq mi (12.5 km^{2})
  - Water: 0.97 sq mi (2.5 km^{2})
- Elevation: 95 ft (29 m)

Population (2010)
  - Total: 5,135
  - Density: 1,054.4/sq mi (407.1/km^{2})
- Source: 2010 Census
- Time zone: UTC−4 (AST)
- ZIP Code: 00791

Candelero Abajo is a barrio in the municipality of Humacao, Puerto Rico. Its population in 2010 was 5,135.

== History ==
Candelero Abajo was in Spain's gazetteers until Puerto Rico was ceded by Spain in the aftermath of the Spanish–American War under the terms of the Treaty of Paris of 1898 and became an unincorporated territory of the United States. In 1899, the United States Department of War conducted a census of Puerto Rico finding that the population of Candelero Abajo barrio was 972.

Historical population
Census	Pop.	Note	%±
1900	972		—
1910	884		−9.1%
1920	1,046		18.3%
1930	1,220		16.6%
1940	1,675		37.3%
1950	1,474		−12.0%
1960	1,422		−3.5%
1970	1,388		−2.4%
1980	1,907		37.4%
1990	2,825		48.1%
2000	3,365		19.1%
2010	5,135		52.6%
U.S. Decennial Census; 1899 (shown as 1900) 1910-1930; 1930-1950 1980-2000 2010

== Flood zone ==
In 2019, updated flood zone maps show that because of its location- where most cyclones enter the island, Humacao is one of the most vulnerable areas of Puerto Rico. Humacao was working on flood mitigation plans and shared that its barrios located on the coast; Antón Ruíz, Punta Santiago, Río Abajo, Buena Vista and Candelero Abajo barrios, are prone to flooding and in danger of being completed destroyed by a hurricane.

== Gallery ==
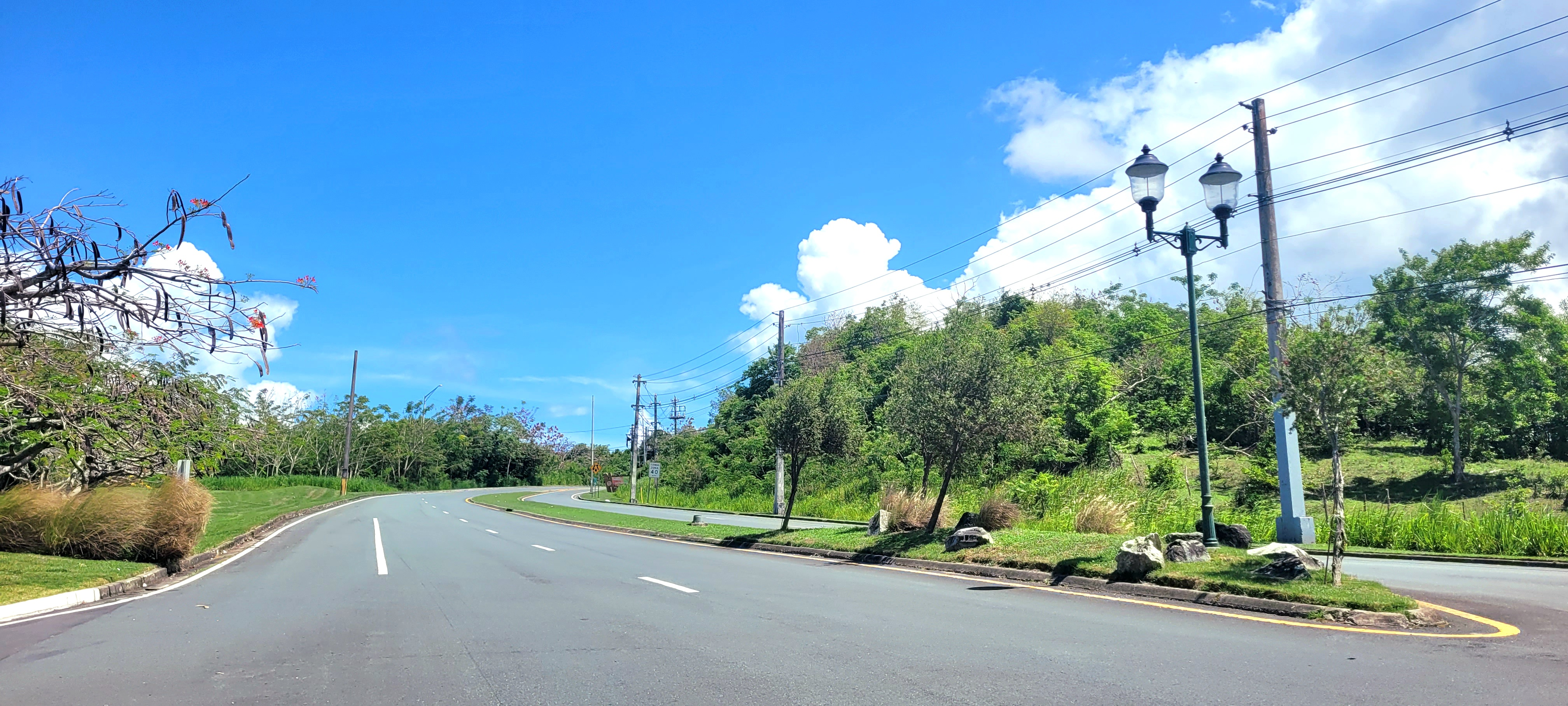
Puerto Rico Highway 906 in Candelero Abajo

== See also ==
- List of communities in Puerto Rico
