= Collores, Humacao, Puerto Rico =

Barrio of Puerto Rico

Collores
- Barrio
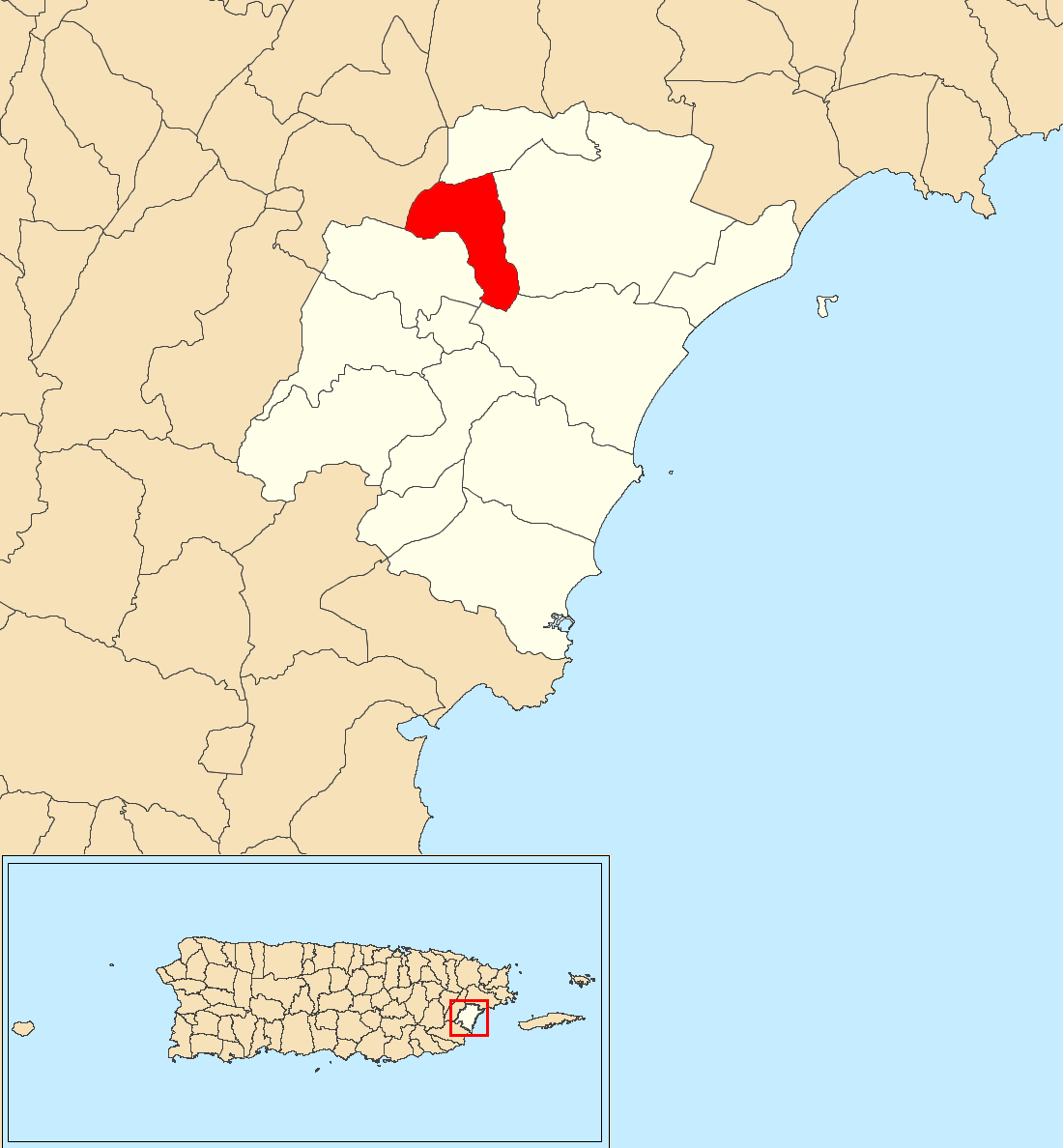
- Location of Collores within the municipality of Humacao shown in red

- Location of Puerto Rico
- Coordinates: 18°10′29″N 65°49′13″W
- Commonwealth: Puerto Rico
- Municipality: Humacao

Area
  - Total: 2.03 sq mi (5.3 km^{2})
  - Land: 2.03 sq mi (5.3 km^{2})
  - Water: 0 sq mi (0 km^{2})
- Elevation: 466 ft (142 m)

Population (2010)
  - Total: 2,770
  - Density: 1,364.5/sq mi (526.8/km^{2})
- Source: 2010 Census
- Time zone: UTC−4 (AST)
- ZIP Code: 00791

Collores is a barrio in the municipality of Humacao, Puerto Rico. Its population in 2010 was 2,770.

== History ==
Collores was in Spain's gazetteers until Puerto Rico was ceded by Spain in the aftermath of the Spanish–American War under the terms of the Treaty of Paris of 1898 and became an unincorporated territory of the United States. In 1899, the United States Department of War conducted a census of Puerto Rico finding that the population of Collores barrio was 1,016.

Historical population
Census	Pop.	Note	%±
1900	1,016		—
1910	1,167		14.9%
1920	1,188		1.8%
1930	1,210		1.9%
1940	1,138		−6.0%
1950	1,840		61.7%
1960	1,098		−40.3%
1970	1,258		14.6%
1980	1,656		31.6%
1990	1,940		17.1%
2000	2,653		36.8%
2010	2,770		4.4%
U.S. Decennial Census; 1899 (shown as 1900) 1910-1930; 1930-1950 1980-2000 2010

== See also ==
- List of communities in Puerto Rico
