= Rafael Orellano =

American baseball player (born 1973)

- Pitcher
- Born: April 28, 1973 (age 53); Humacao, Puerto Rico
- Batted: Left Threw: Left

debut
- 1998, for the Nippon Ham Fighters

Last appearance
- 2000, for the Nippon Ham Fighters

Career statistics
- Win–loss record: 2-8
- Earned run average: 6.17
- Strikeouts: 49

Teams
- Nippon Ham Fighters (1998–2000)

Rafael Antonio Orellano Hernandez (born April 28, 1973) is a Puerto Rican former pitcher who played for the Nippon Ham Fighters of Nippon Professional Baseball from 1998 to 2000.

== Playing career ==
=== American minor leagues ===
The left-handed hurler began his professional baseball career in 1993, playing in the Boston Red Sox minor league system. In 1995, he was ranked the club's 6th-best prospect by Baseball America after going 11–3 with a 2.36 ERA for the GCL Red Sox and Sarasota Red Sox the year before. After going 11–7 with a 3.09 ERA in 27 starts for the Trenton Thunder in 1995, he was named Boston's 9th-best prospect for 1996. His career soon soured, however, and he was out of the minor leagues after the 1997 season. He was 32–29 with a 4.70 ERA in 100 career games (81 starts) at that level.

=== Japan ===
Orellano signed with the Nippon Ham Fighters for 1998 and appeared in 14 games for the club that year, going 1–3 with a 7.50 ERA in 14 games (4 starts). In 30 innings, he allowed 29 walks and struck out 22 batters. In 1999, he was 1–5 with a 4.99 ERA in 21 games (5 starts) and in 2000, he made a single appearance, allowing two walks, one hit and an earned run in 1/3 of an inning. Overall, he went 2–8 with 58 walks, 49 strikeouts and a 6.17 ERA in 36 games (9 starts) in his NPB career.

== Personal life ==
He was born in Humacao, Puerto Rico.
