= Efraín Trelles =

Peruvian historian, writer, journalist and sports commentator

- Born: 28 May 1953; Andahuaylas, Peru
- Died: 1 April 2018 (aged 64); Lima, Peru
- Education: Pontifical Catholic University of Peru; University of Texas at Austin
- Known for: Sports commentator
- Scientific career
- Fields: Spanish colonization of the Americas

Efraín "Cholo" Trelles Aréstegui (28 May 1953 – 1 April 2018) was a Peruvian historian, writer, journalist and sports commentator for press, television and radio.

== Biography ==
Efraín Trelles was born in 1953, in Andahuaylas. Historian trained in colonial history, graduated by the Pontifical Catholic University of Peru, with a thesis that became the classic: Lucas Martínez Vegazo: operation of an initial Peruvian encomienda. He was one of the pioneers in introducing the analysis of data and computer models in his study on the loyalties of the kurakas in the Rebellion of Túpac Amaru II, which he published with Magnus Mörner in 1986.

He then traveled to the University of Austin to do his doctorate studies.

His foray into sports journalism began as a personal hobby. He worked as a columnist in several newspapers of the Peruvian capital as Expreso and La República. He worked as a journalist and historian in RPP and Latina Televisión. His last work was as host of the program La cátedra at Radio Nacional del Perú, along with Roberto Zegarra, Wilmer del Aguila, Ítalo Villarreal, Martín Fernández, Miguel Portanova, Santos Calderón, Dante Mateo, Tito Ponte, Josè Espinoza, among other journalists.
