= Antón Ruíz =

Barrio of Humacao, Puerto Rico

- Barrio
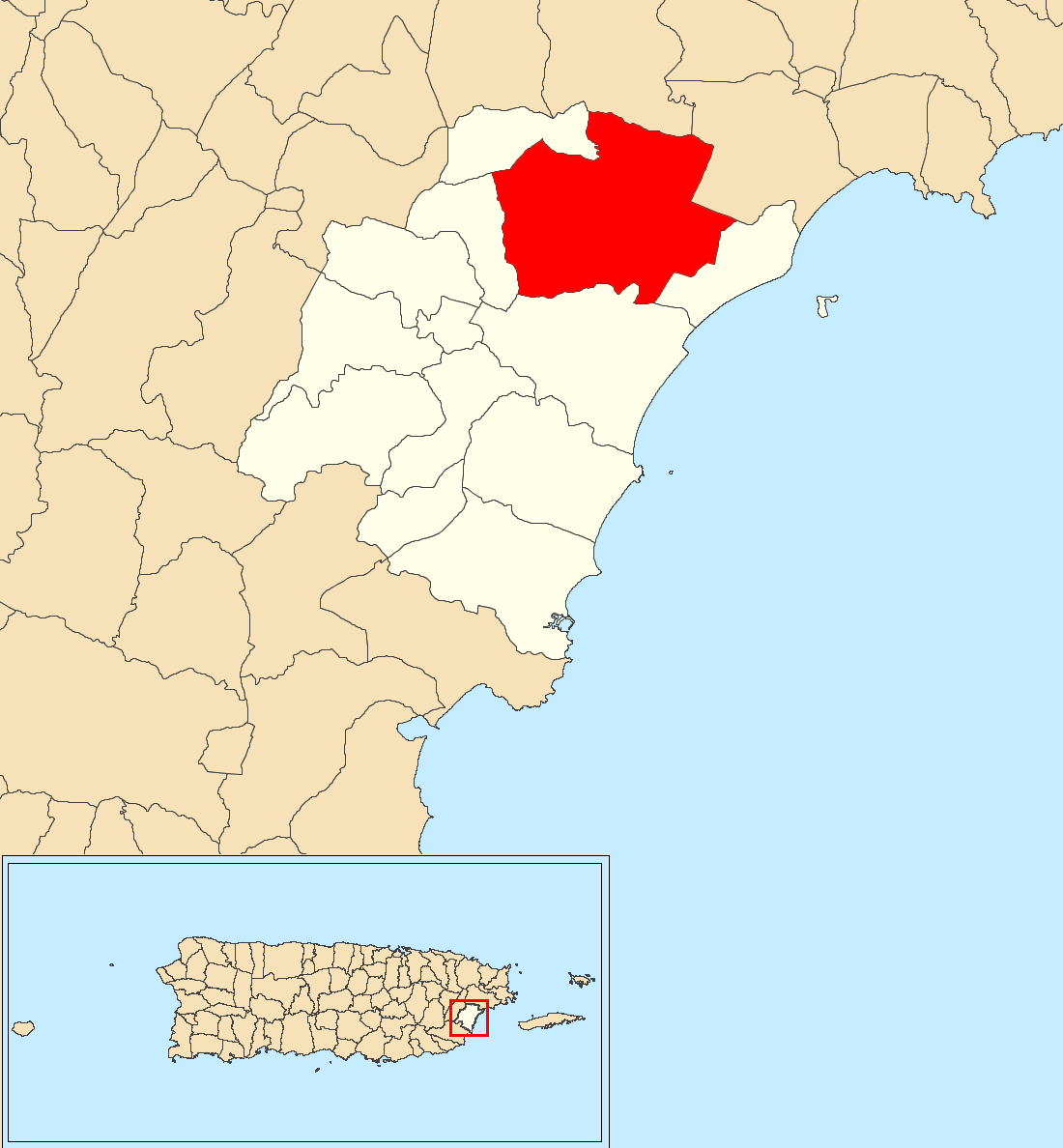
- Location of Antón Ruíz within the municipality of Humacao shown in red

- Location of Puerto Rico
- Coordinates: 18°10′39″N 65°47′06″W
- Commonwealth: Puerto Rico
- Municipality: Humacao

Area
  - Total: 8.4 sq mi (22 km^{2})
  - Land: 8.4 sq mi (22 km^{2})
  - Water: 0 sq mi (0 km^{2})
- Elevation: 13 ft (4.0 m)

Population (2010)
  - Total: 3,496
  - Density: 416.2/sq mi (160.7/km^{2})
- Source: 2010 Census
- Time zone: UTC−4 (AST)
- ZIP Code: 00791

Antón Ruíz is a barrio in the municipality of Humacao, Puerto Rico. Its population in 2010 was 3,496.

== History ==
Antón Ruíz was in Spain's gazetteers until Puerto Rico was ceded by Spain in the aftermath of the Spanish–American War under the terms of the Treaty of Paris of 1898 and became an unincorporated territory of the United States. In 1899, the United States Department of War conducted a census of Puerto Rico finding that the population of Antón Ruíz barrio was 987.

Historical population
Census	Pop.	Note	%±
1900	987		—
1910	1,165		18.0%
1920	1,505		29.2%
1930	2,500		66.1%
1940	2,362		−5.5%
1950	2,327		−1.5%
1960	2,077		−10.7%
1970	2,056		−1.0%
1980	2,429		18.1%
1990	3,672		51.2%
2000	3,770		2.7%
2010	3,496		−7.3%
U.S. Decennial Census; 1899 (shown as 1900) 1910-1930; 1930-1950 1980-2000 2010

== Flood zone ==
In 2019, updated flood zone maps show that because of its location- where most cyclones enter the island, Humacao is one of the most vulnerable areas of Puerto Rico. Humacao was working on flood mitigation plans and shared that its barrios located on the coast; Antón Ruíz, Punta Santiago, Río Abajo, Buena Vista and Candelero Abajo barrios, are prone to flooding and in danger of being completed destroyed by a hurricane.

== See also ==
- List of communities in Puerto Rico
