= Candelero Arriba =

Barrio of Humacao, Puerto Rico

- Barrio
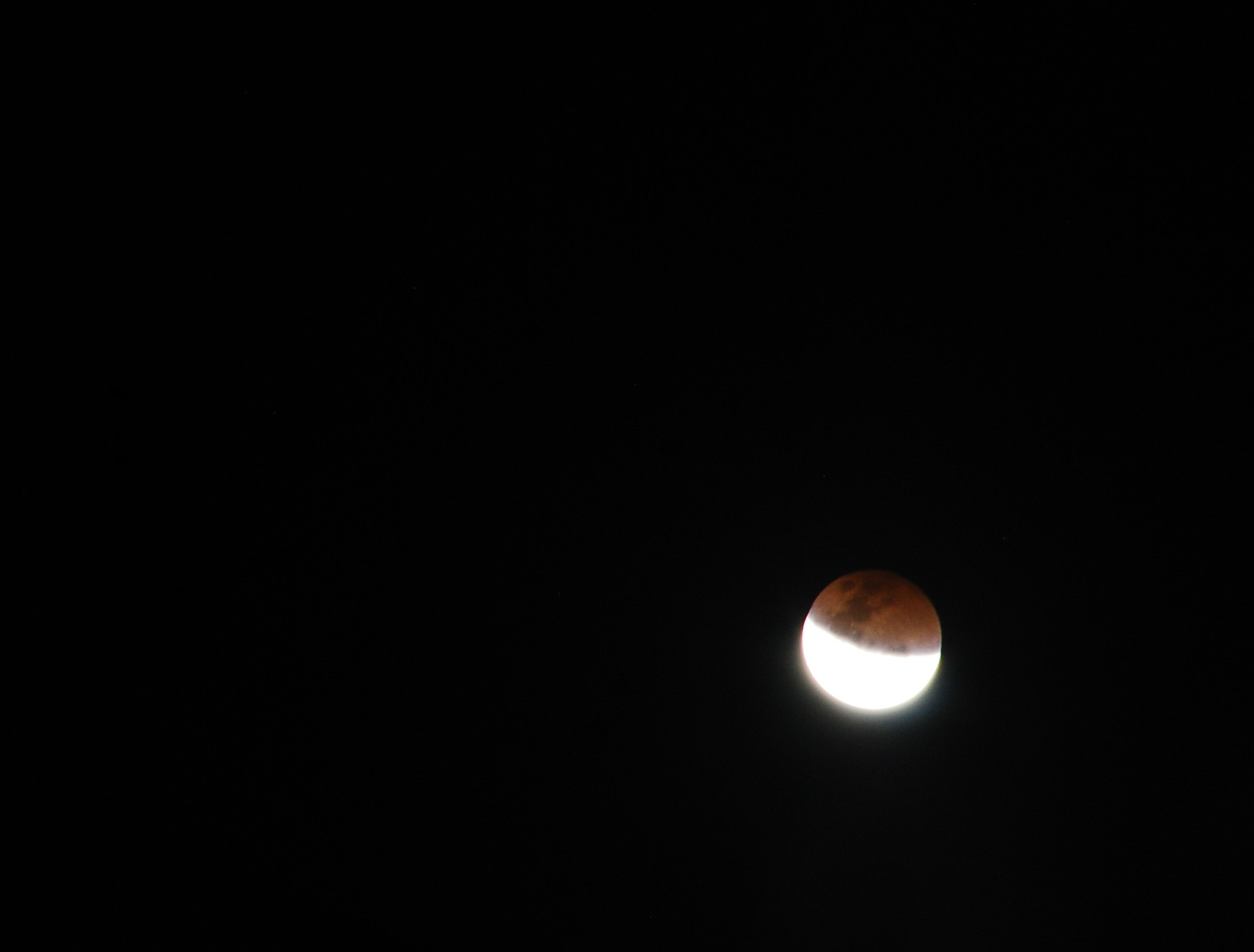
- March 2007 lunar eclipse as seen from Candelero Arriba

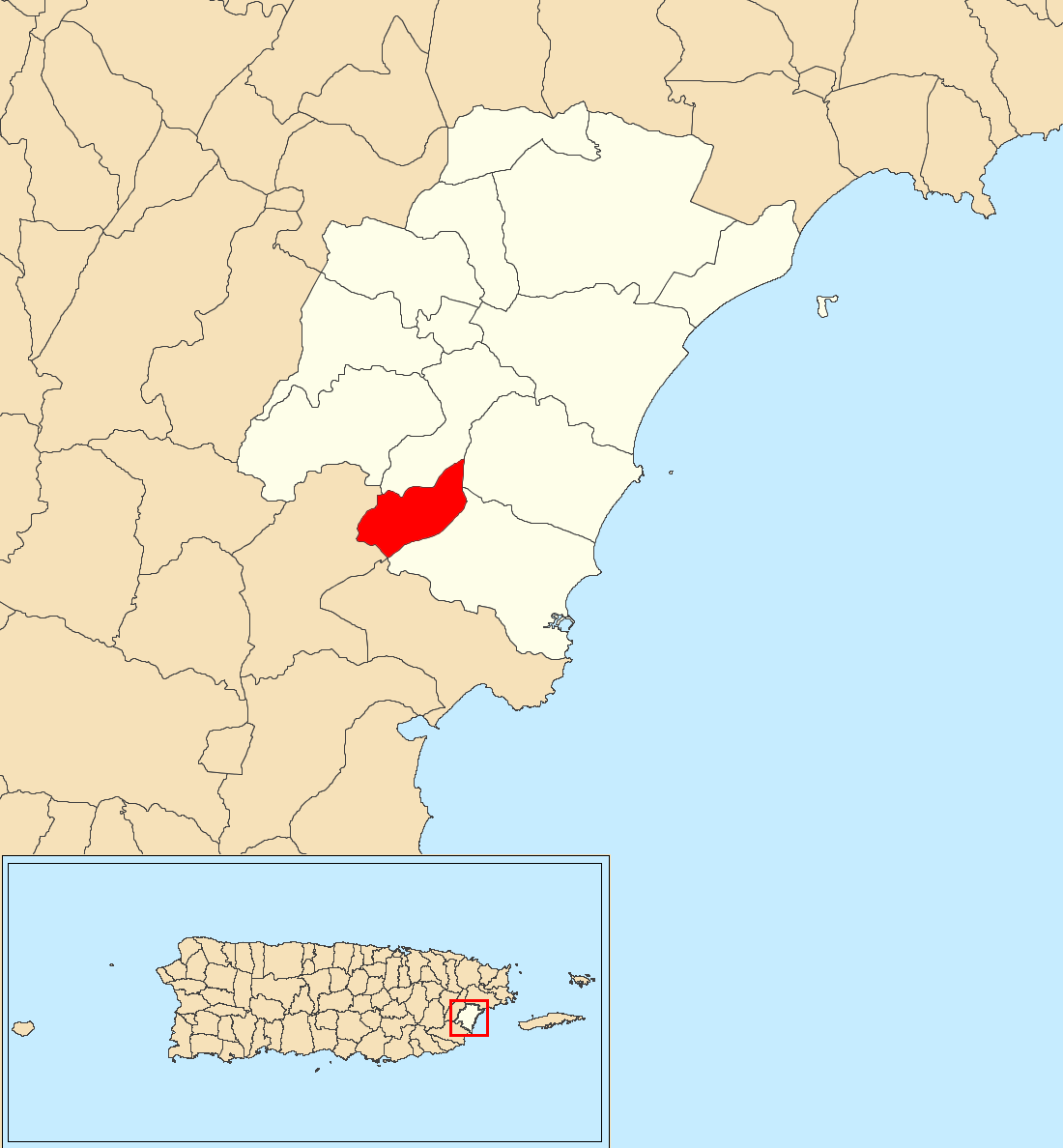
- Location of Candelero Arriba within the municipality of Humacao shown in red

- Location of Puerto Rico
- Coordinates: 18°06′20″N 65°50′03″W
- Commonwealth: Puerto Rico
- Municipality: Humacao

Area
  - Total: 1.47 sq mi (3.8 km^{2})
  - Land: 1.47 sq mi (3.8 km^{2})
  - Water: 0 sq mi (0 km^{2})
- Elevation: 420 ft (130 m)

Population (2010)
  - Total: 3,596
  - Density: 2,463/sq mi (951/km^{2})
- Source: 2010 Census
- Time zone: UTC−4 (AST)
- ZIP Code: 00791

Candelero Arriba is a barrio in the municipality of Humacao, Puerto Rico. Its population in 2010 was 3,596.

== History ==
Candelero Arriba was in Spain's gazetteers until Puerto Rico was ceded by Spain in the aftermath of the Spanish–American War under the terms of the Treaty of Paris of 1898 and became an unincorporated territory of the United States. In 1899, the United States Department of War conducted a census of Puerto Rico finding that the population of Candelero Arriba barrio was 811.

Historical population
Census	Pop.	Note	%±
1900	811		—
1910	889		9.6%
1920	1,128		26.9%
1930	1,080		−4.3%
1940	1,347		24.7%
1950	2,023		50.2%
1960	2,227		10.1%
1970	2,364		6.2%
1980	2,951		24.8%
1990	3,443		16.7%
2000	3,747		8.8%
2010	3,596		−4.0%
U.S. Decennial Census; 1899 (shown as 1900) 1910-1930; 1930-1950 1980-2000 2010

== See also ==
- List of communities in Puerto Rico
