= Rafael Trelles =

Puerto Rican postmodern artist

Rafael Trelles (born April 27, 1957) is a postmodern artist from Puerto Rico.

== Early life and education ==
Rafael Trelles was born on April 27, 1957, in Santurce, Puerto Rico. After receiving a bachelor's degree in Art from the University of Puerto Rico, Trelles enrolled as a graduate student at the University of Mexico in Mexico City, where he eventually earned a doctorate. In 1985 he moved to the Canary Islands in Spain.

== On Concrete (Urban Graphic in Buenos Aires) – Documentary (2007) ==
En Concreto (translates to On Concrete) is an artistic project of urban interventions developed by Rafael Trelles since the summer of 2004 on the walls, side walks and utility poles of several cities including the island of Vieques.
