= Puerto Rico Highway 192 =

Highway in Puerto Rico

Highway 192
- Ruta 192

Route information
- Maintained by Puerto Rico DTPW
- Length: 3.1 km (1.9 mi)
- Existed: 1953–present

Major junctions
- South end: PR-3 in Húcares
- PR-971 in Húcares–Naguabo barrio-pueblo
- North end: PR-31 in Río–Maizales

Location
- Country: United States
- Territory: Puerto Rico
- Municipalities: Naguabo

Highway system
- Roads in Puerto Rico; List
← PR-191	→ PR-193

Puerto Rico Highway 192 (PR-192) is the main access to downtown Naguabo, Puerto Rico. This road extends from PR-31 between Río and Maizales barrios (west of downtown) to PR-3 in Húcares.

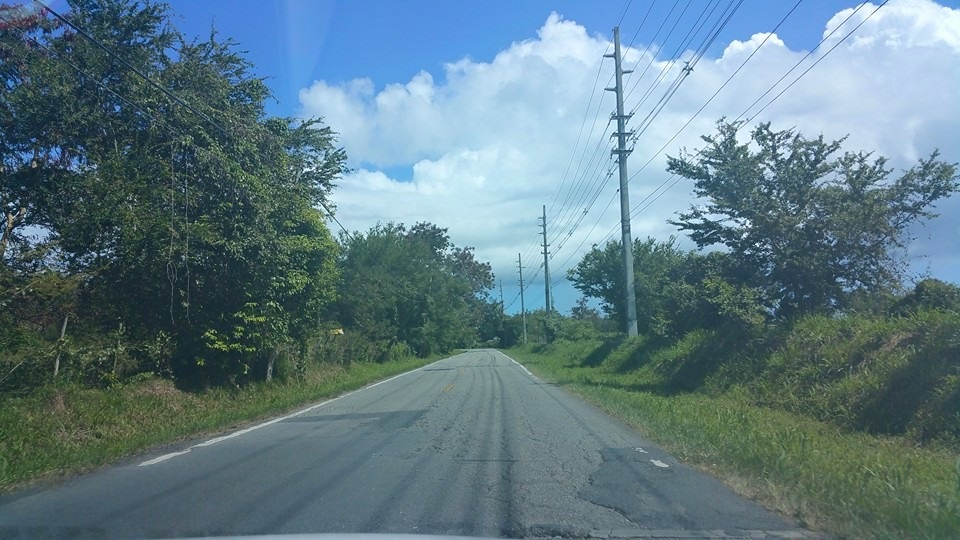
Puerto Rico Highway 192 in Húcares, looking south

== Major intersections ==
The entire route is located in Naguabo.

Location	km	mi	Destinations	Notes
Húcares	0.0	0.0	PR-3 – Ceiba, Humacao	Southern terminus of PR-192
Húcares–Naguabo barrio-pueblo line	1.8	1.1	PR-971 – Duque	
Naguabo barrio-pueblo	2.4– 2.5	1.5– 1.6	To PR-927 – Río	
Río–Maizales line	3.1	1.9	PR-31 – Juncos, Ceiba	Northern terminus of PR-192
1.000 mi = 1.609 km; 1.000 km = 0.621 mi

== See also ==
- 1953 Puerto Rico highway renumbering
