= List of barrios and sectors of Naguabo, Puerto Rico =

Like all municipalities of Puerto Rico, Naguabo is subdivided into administrative units called barrios, which are, in contemporary times, roughly comparable to minor civil divisions, (and means wards or boroughs or neighborhoods in English). The barrios and subbarrios, in turn, are further subdivided into smaller local populated place areas/units called sectores (sectors in English). The types of sectores may vary, from normally sector to urbanización to reparto to barriada to residencial, among others. Some sectors appear in two barrios.

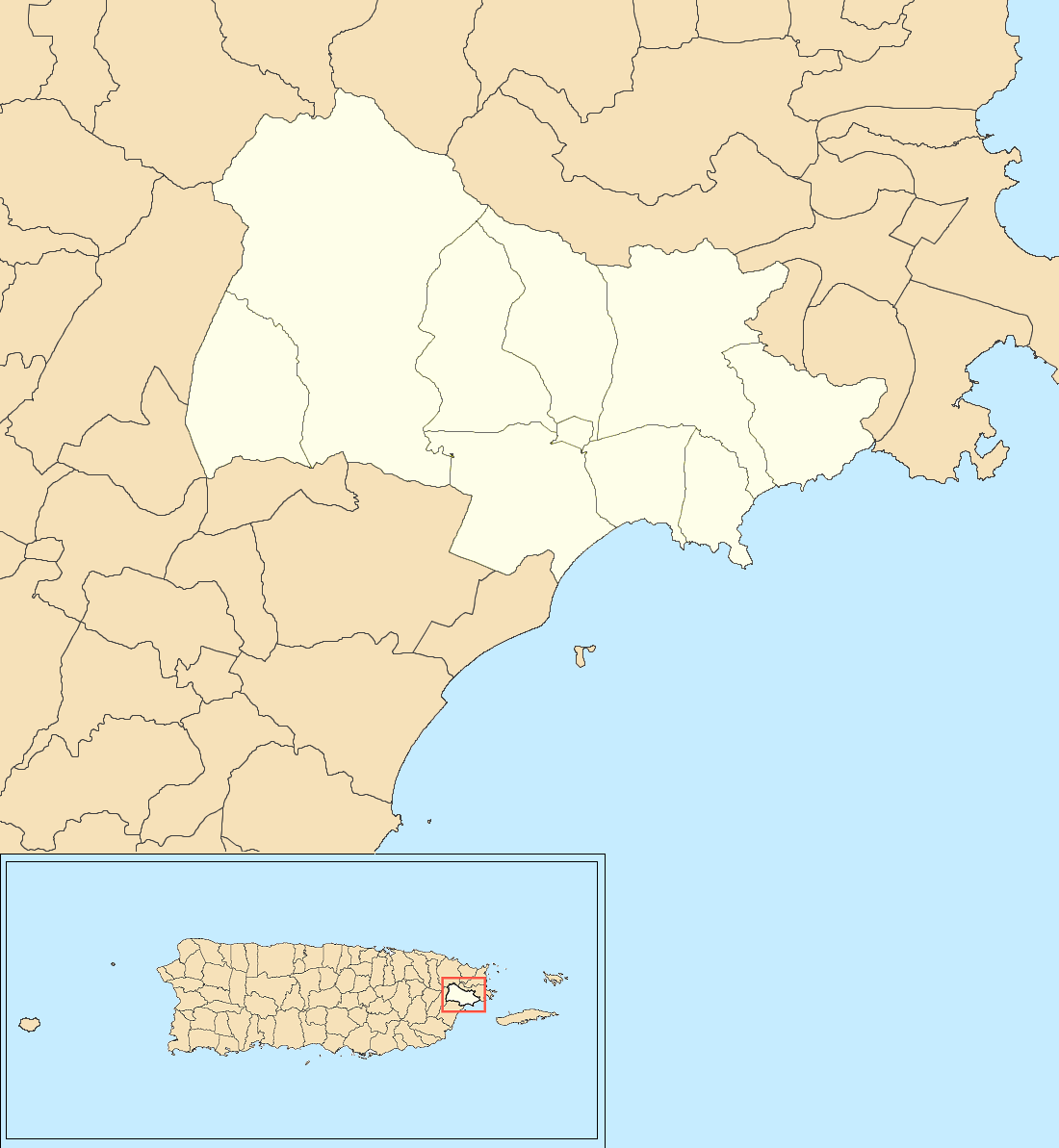
Naguabo map with barrio subdivisions

== List of sectors by barrio ==
=== Daguao ===
- Parcelas Esperanza
- Parcelas Nuevas
- Parcelas Viejas
- Sector Armando Medina
- Sector Cipey
- Sector Cuesta Esperanza
- Sector Daguao Arriba
- Sector El Corcho
- Sector Fanguito
- Sector Los Millones
- Sector Medina
- Sector Shangai
- Urbanización Casa Bella
- Urbanización Hacienda Grande
- Urbanización Promised Land

=== Duque ===
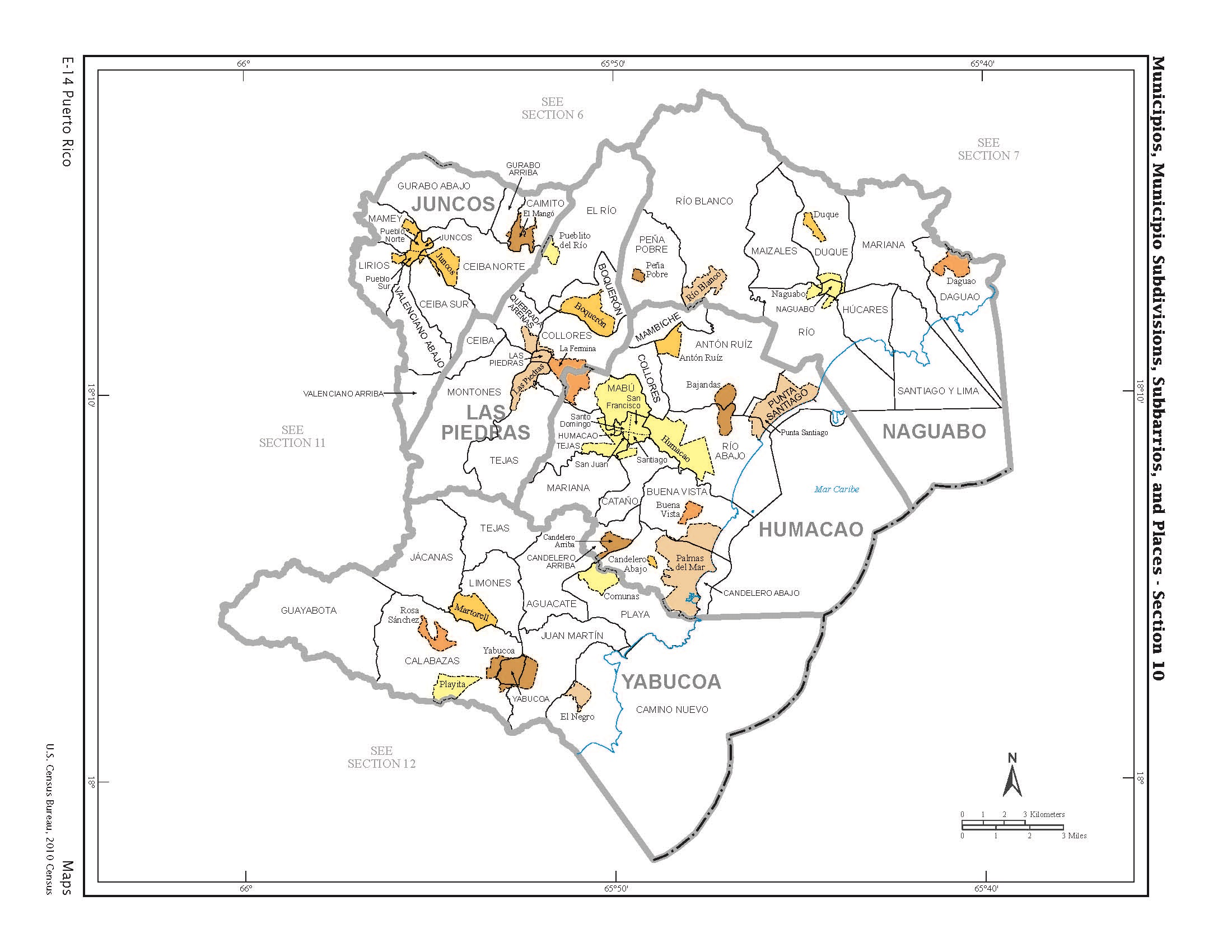
US 2010 Census map of Municipio Subdivisions of Naguabo, and neighboring municipios

- Camino Municipal
- Parcelas Duque
- Parcelas Invasión
- Reparto Santiago
- Sector Dávila
- Sector Hacienda Correas
- Sector La Sierra
- Sector Paraíso Cabrera (El Pueblito)
- Sector Pomales
- Sector Ramos
- Sector Rivieras del Río
- Sector San Cristóbal
- Sector Tablones
- Sector Villa Awilda
- Urbanización Juan Mendoza
- Urbanización La Quinta
- Villa del Rosario

=== Húcares ===
- Calle Punta Lima
- Estancias de Húcares
- Hacienda El Triunfo
- Las Mercedes (Calle de la Playa)
- Mansiones de Playa Húcares
- Parcelas Invasión
- Parcelas Nuevas
- Parcelas Playa
- Residencial Húcares I y II
- Sector Calle del Pueblo
- Sector Cambímbora
- Sector El Faro
- Sector Fanduca
- Sector La Changa
- Sector La Ola
- Urbanización Cala de Húcares
- Urbanización Jardín del Este
- Urbanización Lomas de Santo Tomás
- Urbanización Los Valles
- Urbanización Mar Caribe
- Urbanización Santo Tomás

=== Maizales ===
- La Pitina
- Loma del Viento
- Parcelas La Fe
- Parcelas Maizales
- Rancho Grande
- Sector Capiro
- Sector Cecilia
- Sector Colonia La Fe
- Sector El Cabro
- Sector Los Ramírez
- Sector Ponderosa
- Sector Rincón
- Urbanización Vista Verde

=== Mariana ===
- Barriada Ensanche Relámpago
- Comunidad Finquitas
- Parcelas Mariana
- Quebrada Palma
- Sector Agosto
- Sector Alturas de Mariana (Sector Santiago y Lima)
- Sector Arenas Blancas
- Sector Botijita
- Sector Daguao Arriba
- Sector El Banco
- Sector José Lima
- Sector La Coroza
- Sector La Paloma
- Sector La Vega
- Sector Las Malangas
- Sector Limones
- Sector Los Romanes
- Sector Marzot
- Sector Rincón

=== Naguabo barrio-pueblo ===
- Barriada Salsipuedes (Calle José de Diego)
- Calle Armando González
- Calle Buenos Aires
- Calles del Casco del Pueblo
- Carretera Militar (from Caserío until Centro de Diagnóstico)
- Central El Triunfo
- Edificio Cabrera
- Edificio Inés María Mendoza
- Residencial Ignacio Morales Dávila
- Residencial Naguabo Valley
- Sector Loma El Triunfo
- Urbanización Brisas de Naguabo
- Urbanización City Palace I
- Urbanización City Palace II
- Urbanización El Duque (Los Maestros)
- Urbanización Jardines de la Vía
- Urbanización Riberas del Río

=== Peña Pobre ===
- Callejón Mendoza
- Parcelas Nuevas
- Parcelas Playa
- Parcelas Viejas
- Sector Centro
- Sector Ciénaga
- Sector El Molino Rojo
- Sector El Pilón
- Sector Fanduca
- Sector Higüerillo
- Sector La Loma
- Sector La Suiza
- Sector Los Benítez
- Sector Mambiche Blanco
- Sector Medianía Alta
- Sector Medianía
- Sector Peña Pobre Abajo
- Sector Peña Pobre Arriba
- Sector Villa Terapia
- Urbanización Villa de Monte Cristo

=== Río ===
- Extensión Diplo
- Extensión Diplo III
- Residencial Torres del Río
- Residencial Villa del Río
- Row House
- Sector Brazo Seco
- Urbanización Brisas del Valle
- Urbanización Ciudad Dorada
- Urbanización Jardines de la Esperanza
- Urbanización Praderas del Este
- Urbanización Ramón Rivero
- Urbanización Tropical Beach
- Urbanización Vistas de Naguabo

=== Río Blanco ===
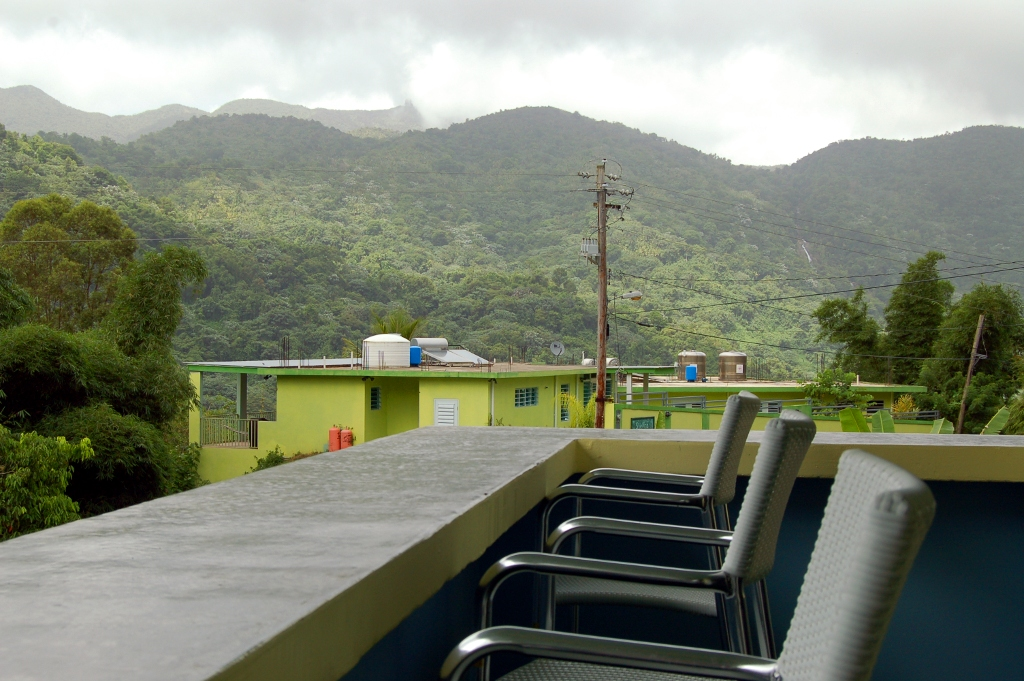
El Yunque from Casa Cubuy Restaurant in Río Blanco

- Finca San Eladio
- Parcelas Río Blanco
- Parcelas Sector Común
- Sector Camino Viejo
- Sector Común
- Sector Cubuy
- Sector El Fuego
- Sector El Puente
- Sector Florida
- Sector La Cuchilla
- Sector La Joba
- Sector La Mina
- Sector Río Blanco Arriba
- Urbanización Río Blanco Heights
- Urbanización Vistas de Río Blanco

=== Santiago y Lima ===
- Carretera 31 (from El Gravero until Edificio Rodríguez)
- Edificio Rodríguez
- Parcelas Nuevas
- Parcelas Viejas
- Reparto Maribel
- Sector La Altura
- Sector Monte Soco
- Sector Morrillo

== See also ==
- List of communities in Puerto Rico
