= Peña Pobre =

Barrio of Naguabo, Puerto Rico)

- Barrio
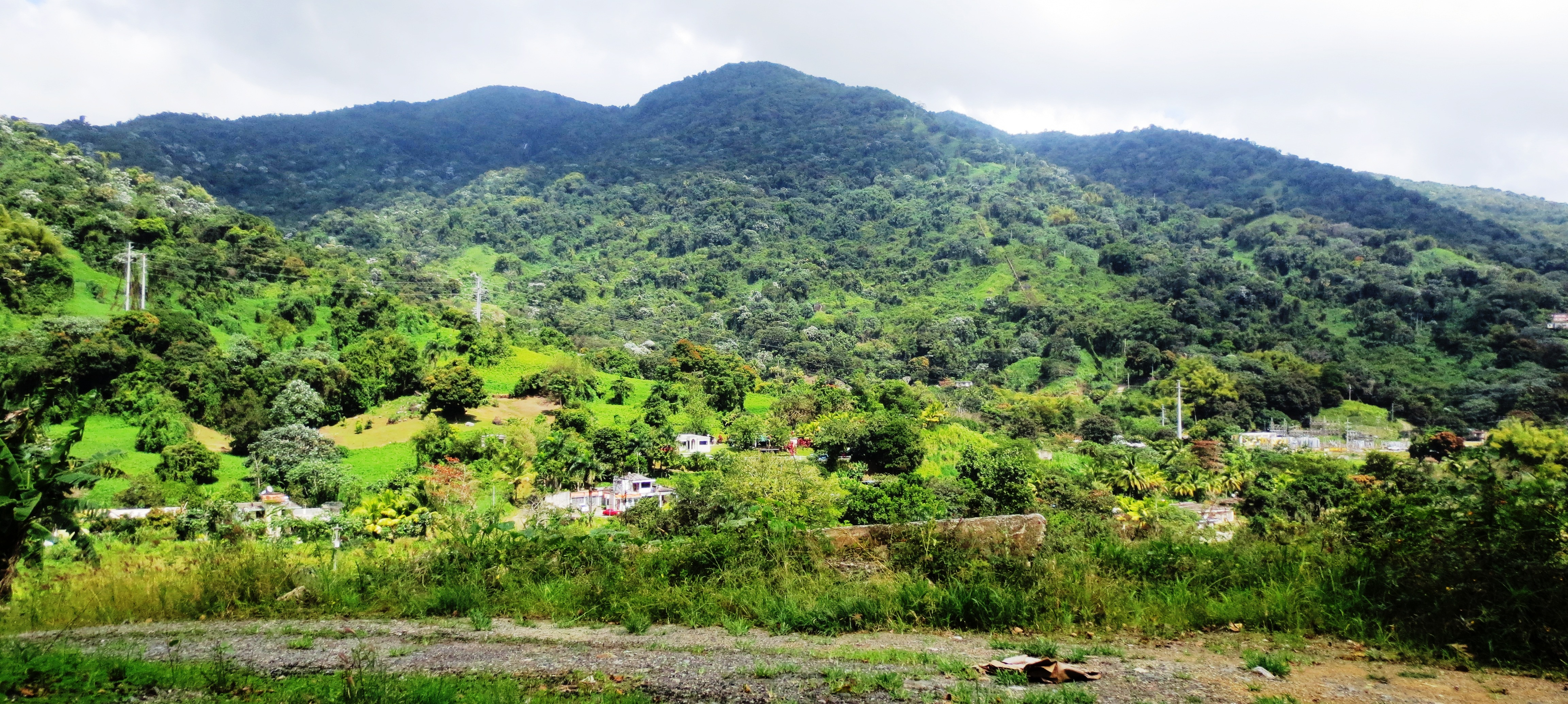
- View of El Toro peak from Peña Pobre

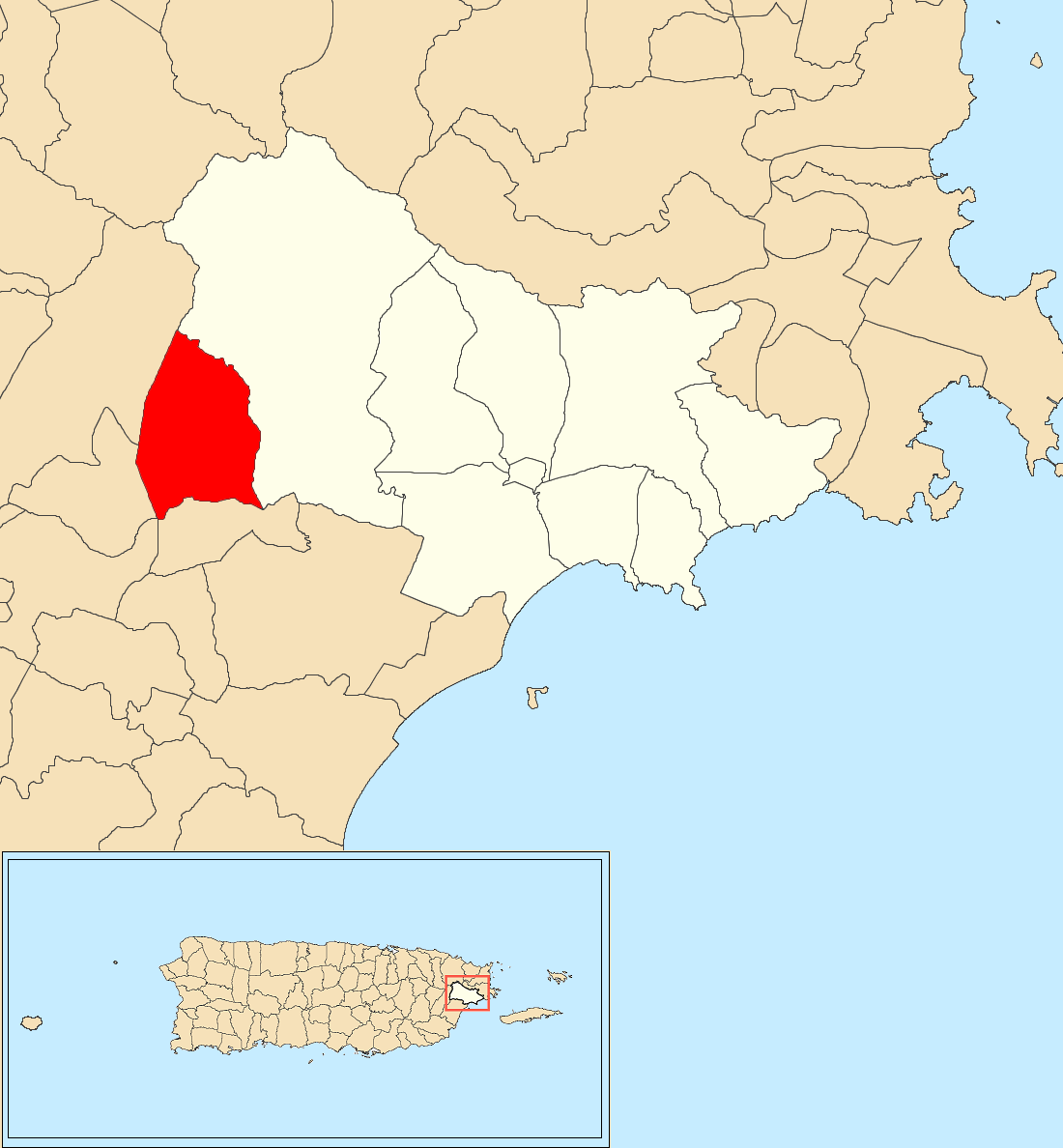
- Location of Peña Pobre within the municipality of Naguabo shown in red

- Location of Puerto Rico
- Coordinates: 18°13′13″N 65°48′55″W
- Commonwealth: Puerto Rico
- Municipality: Naguabo

Area
  - Total: 4.38 sq mi (11.3 km^{2})
  - Land: 4.38 sq mi (11.3 km^{2})
  - Water: 0 sq mi (0 km^{2})
- Elevation: 413 ft (126 m)

Population (2010)
  - Total: 4,131
  - Density: 943.2/sq mi (364.2/km^{2})
- Source: 2010 Census
- Time zone: UTC−4 (AST)

Peña Pobre is a barrio in the municipality of Naguabo, Puerto Rico. Its population in 2010 was 4,131.

== History ==
Peña Pobre was in Spain's gazetteers until Puerto Rico was ceded by Spain in the aftermath of the Spanish–American War under the terms of the Treaty of Paris of 1898 and became an unincorporated territory of the United States. In 1899, the United States Department of War conducted a census of Puerto Rico finding that the population of Peña Pobre barrio was 1,064.

Historical population
Census	Pop.	Note	%±
1900	1,064		—
1910	1,367		28.5%
1920	1,517		11.0%
1930	1,693		11.6%
1940	1,798		6.2%
1950	1,990		10.7%
1960	1,798		−9.6%
1970	2,218		23.4%
1980	3,152		42.1%
1990	3,814		21.0%
2000	3,872		1.5%
2010	4,131		6.7%
U.S. Decennial Census; 1899 (shown as 1900) 1910-1930; 1930-1950 1980-2000 2010

== Sectors ==
Barrios (which are, in contemporary times, roughly comparable to minor civil divisions) in turn are further subdivided into smaller local populated place areas/units called sectores (sectors in English). The types of sectores may vary, from normally sector to urbanización to reparto to barriada to residencial, among others.

The following sectors are in Peña Pobre barrio:

Callejón Mendoza, Parcelas Nuevas, Parcelas Playa, Parcelas Viejas, Sector Centro, Sector Ciénaga, Sector El Molino Rojo, Sector El Pilón, Sector Fanduca, Sector Higüerillo, Sector La Loma, Sector La Suiza, Sector Los Benítez, Sector Mambiche Blanco, Sector Medianía Alta, Sector Medianía, Sector Peña Pobre Abajo, Sector Peña Pobre Arriba, Sector Villa Terapia, and Urbanización Villa de Monte Cristo.

== Hurricane Maria ==
Peña Pobre was hit especially hard by Hurricane Maria on September 20, 2017. Members of Jesucristo Monte Moriah, a local church, worked with World Central Kitchen and José Andrés to prepare meals. The infrastructure had been destroyed and Puerto Ricans were finding it very difficult to find ingredients for cooking, money for buying food, or gasoline to move around. This community is located up in the mountains accessed through steep, curvy roads which had lost their borders. The community worked to cook and deliver meals to families that could not feed themselves and their families.

== See also ==
- List of communities in Puerto Rico
- List of barrios and sectors of Naguabo, Puerto Rico
