= Santiago y Lima =

Barrio of Naguabo, Puerto Rico

- Barrio
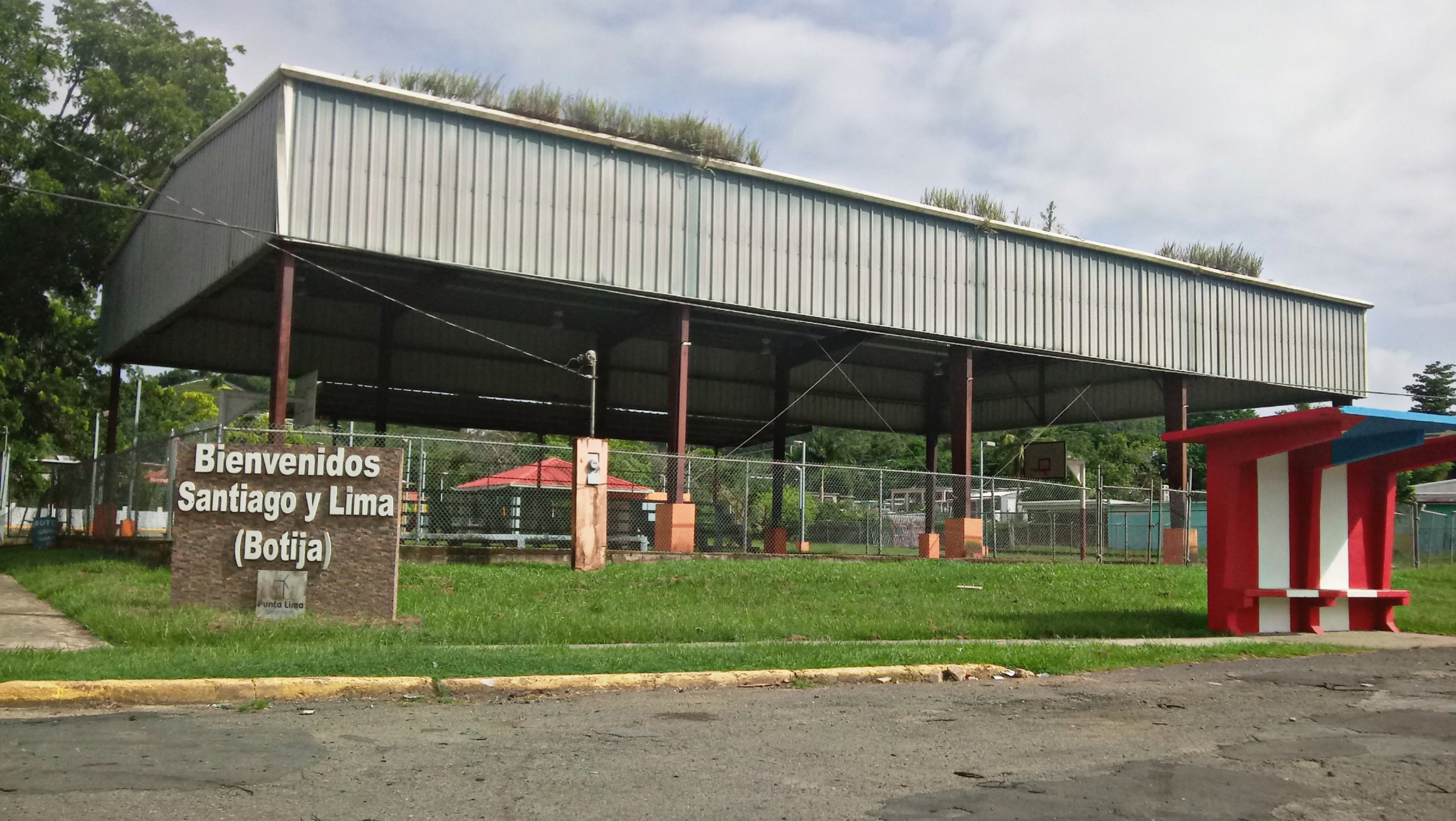
- Basketball court and park in Santiago y Lima

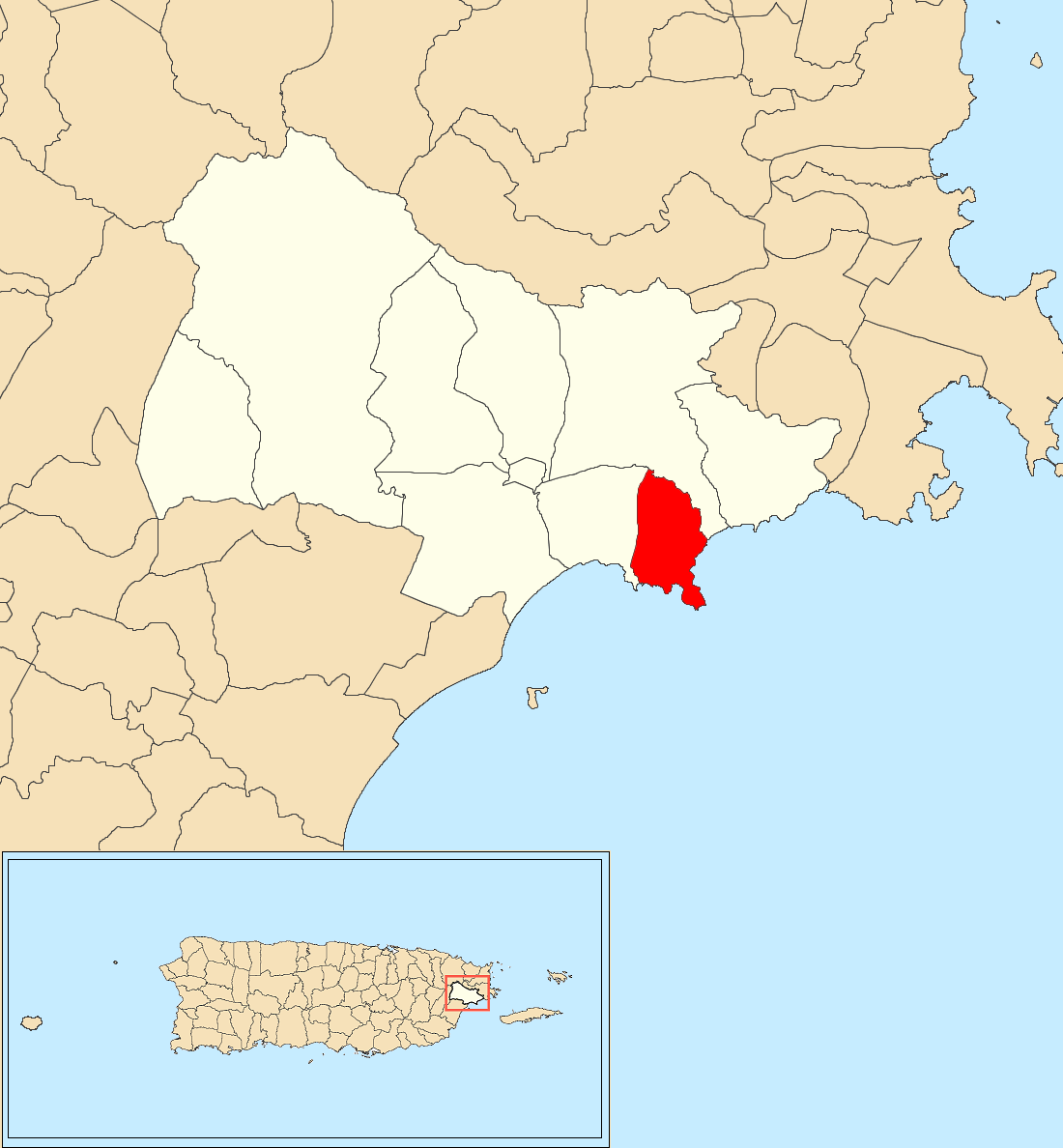
- Location of Santiago y Lima within the municipality of Naguabo shown in red

- Location of Puerto Rico
- Coordinates: 18°10′55″N 65°41′42″W
- Commonwealth: Puerto Rico
- Municipality: Naguabo

Area
  - Total: 6.25 sq mi (16.2 km^{2})
  - Land: 1.82 sq mi (4.7 km^{2})
  - Water: 4.43 sq mi (11.5 km^{2})
- Elevation: 0 ft (0 m)

Population (2010)
  - Total: 710
  - Density: 390.1/sq mi (150.6/km^{2})
- Source: 2010 Census
- Time zone: UTC−4 (AST)

Santiago y Lima is a barrio in the municipality of Naguabo, Puerto Rico. Its population in 2010 was 710.

== History ==
Santiago y Lima was in Spain's gazetteers until Puerto Rico was ceded by Spain in the aftermath of the Spanish–American War under the terms of the Treaty of Paris of 1898 and became an unincorporated territory of the United States. In 1899, the United States Department of War conducted a census of Puerto Rico finding that the combined population of Río and Santiago y Lima barrios was 902.

Historical population
| Census | Pop. | Note | %± |
|---|---|---|---|
| 1910 | 981 | | — |
| 1920 | 524 | | −46.6% |
| 1930 | 620 | | 18.3% |
| 1940 | 1,048 | | 69.0% |
| 1950 | 218 | | −79.2% |
| 1960 | 279 | | 28.0% |
| 1970 | 1,042 | | 273.5% |
| 1980 | 940 | | −9.8% |
| 1990 | 1,118 | | 18.9% |
| 2000 | 929 | | −16.9% |
| 2010 | 710 | | −23.6% |
U.S. Decennial Census; 1900 (N/A) 1910-1930; 1930-1950 1980-2000 2010

== Sectors ==
Barrios (which are, in contemporary times, roughly comparable to minor civil divisions) in turn are further subdivided into smaller local populated place areas/units called sectores (sectors in English). The types of sectores may vary, from normally sector to urbanización to reparto to barriada to residencial, among others.

The following sectors are in Santiago y Lima barrio:

Carretera 31 (from El Gravero until Edificio Rodríguez), Edificio Rodríguez, Parcelas Nuevas, Parcelas Viejas, Reparto Maribel, Sector La Altura, Sector Monte Soco, and Sector Morrillo.

== Wind turbines ==
There are thirteen wind turbines located in Punta Lima, some of which were damaged by Hurricane María in September 2017.

== Gallery ==
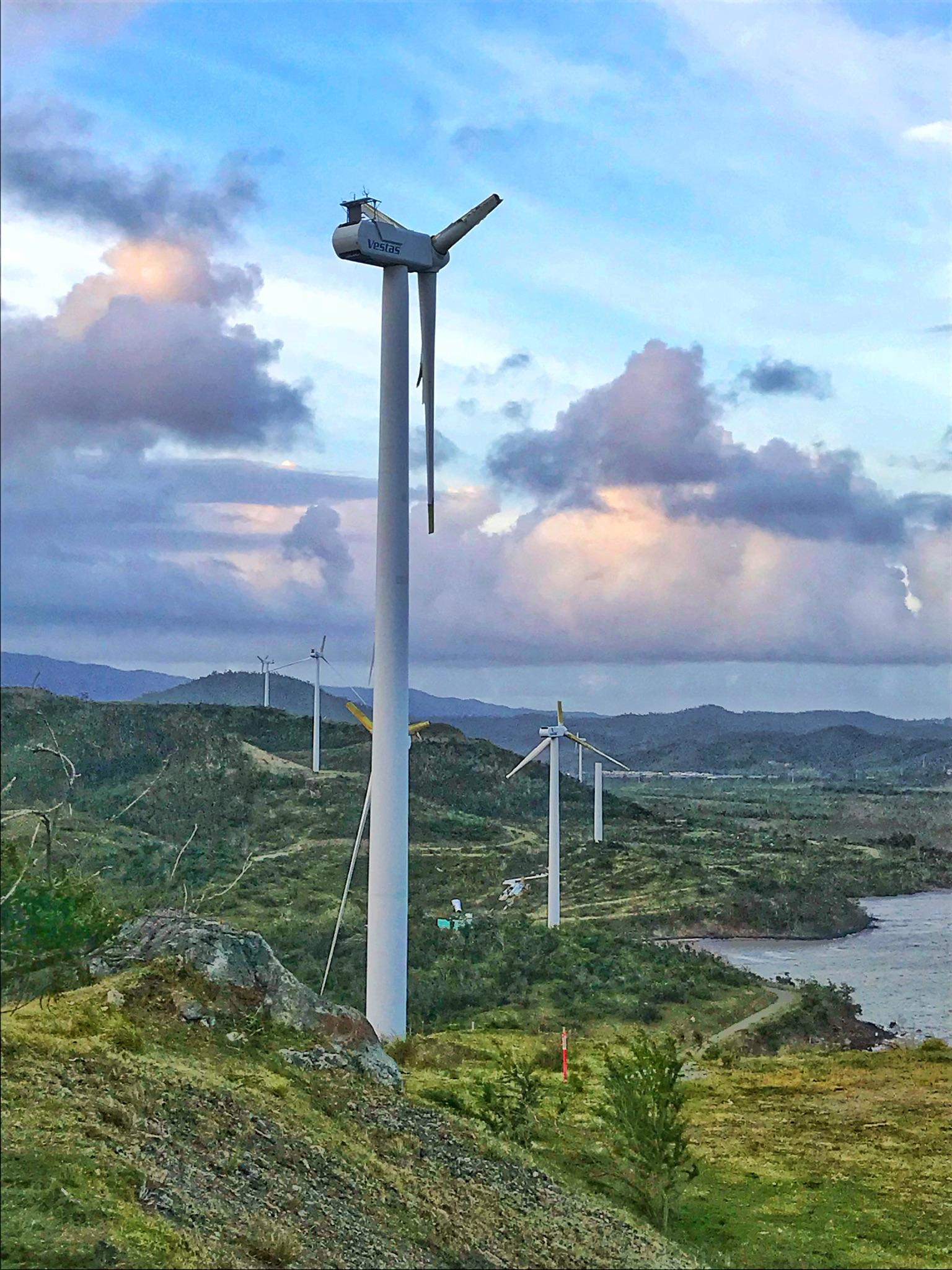
Hurricane Maria damaged wind turbines at Punta Lima

== See also ==
- List of communities in Puerto Rico
- List of barrios and sectors of Naguabo, Puerto Rico
