= Daguao, Naguabo, Puerto Rico =

Barrio of Puerto Rico

Daguao
- Barrio
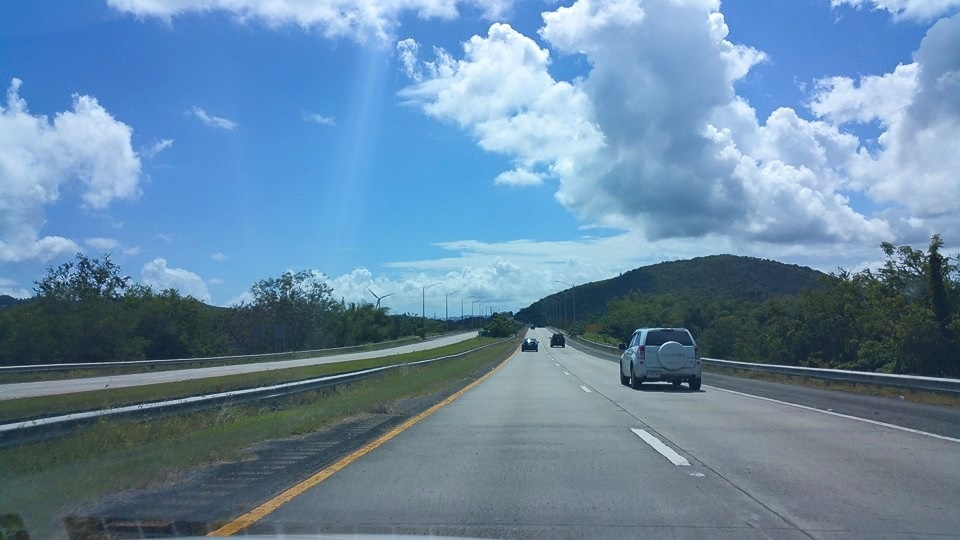
- Puerto Rico Highway 53 in Daguao

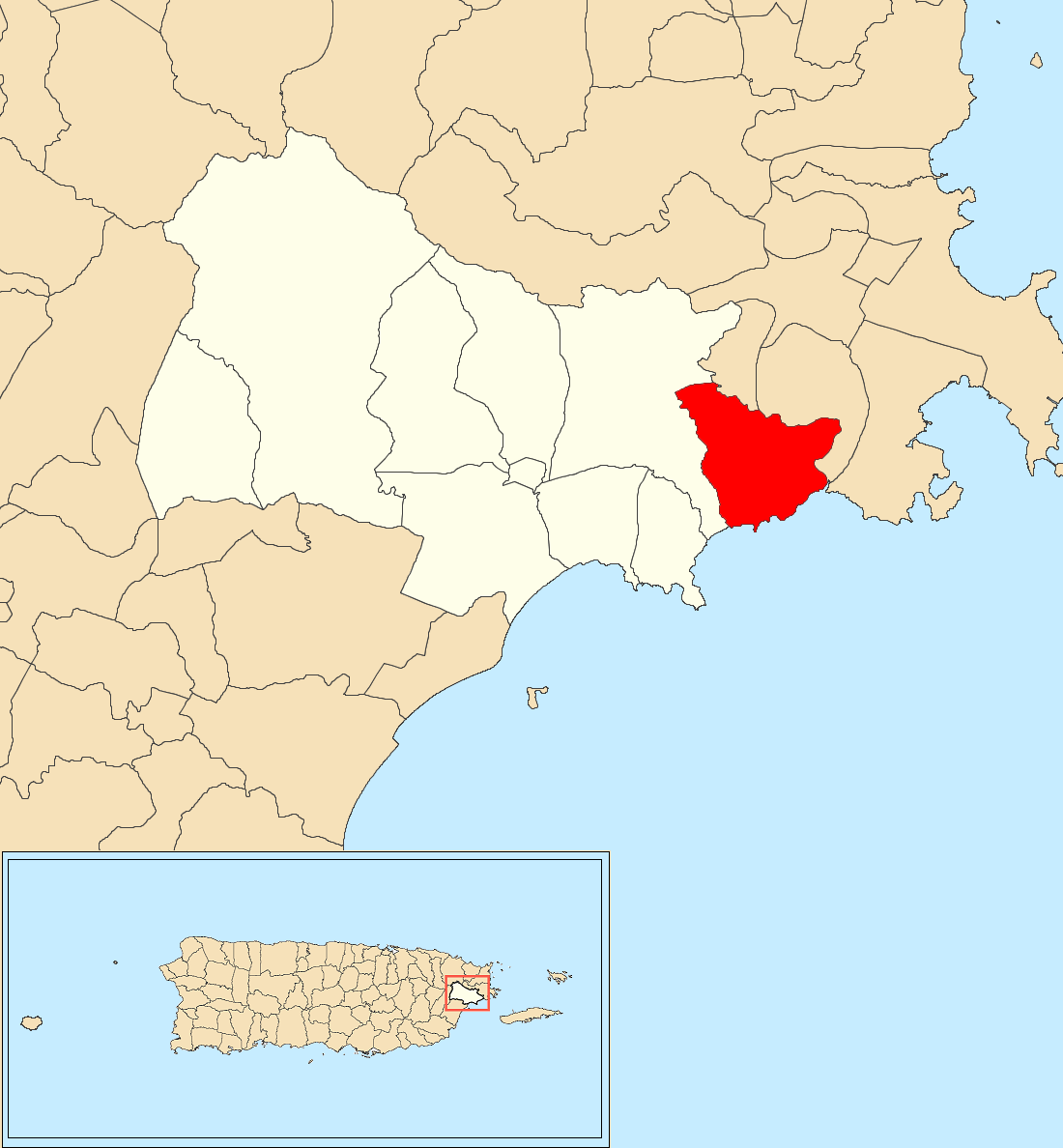
- Location of Daguao within the municipality of Naguabo shown in red

- Location of Puerto Rico
- Coordinates: 18°12′17″N 65°40′32″W
- Commonwealth: Puerto Rico
- Municipality: Naguabo

Area
  - Total: 6.07 sq mi (15.7 km^{2})
  - Land: 3.63 sq mi (9.4 km^{2})
  - Water: 2.44 sq mi (6.3 km^{2})
- Elevation: 148 ft (45 m)

Population (2010)
  - Total: 2,273
  - Density: 626.2/sq mi (241.8/km^{2})
- Source: 2010 Census
- Time zone: UTC−4 (AST)

Daguao is a barrio in the municipality of Naguabo, Puerto Rico. Its population in 2010 was 2,273.

== History ==
In its early days, Daguao was slated to be the capital of Puerto Rico but the area was destroyed by Kalinago from neighbor-island Vieques and by Taínos from the eastern area of Puerto Rico.

Daguao was in Spain's gazetteers until Puerto Rico was ceded by Spain in the aftermath of the Spanish–American War under the terms of the Treaty of Paris of 1898 and became an unincorporated territory of the United States. In 1899, the United States Department of War conducted a census of Puerto Rico finding that the population of Daguao barrio was 756.

Historical population
Census	Pop.	Note	%±
1900	756		—
1910	1,207		59.7%
1920	1,196		−0.9%
1930	1,073		−10.3%
1940	1,317		22.7%
1950	1,640		24.5%
1960	1,760		7.3%
1970	2,294		30.3%
1980	2,003		−12.7%
1990	2,296		14.6%
2000	2,186		−4.8%
2010	2,273		4.0%
U.S. Decennial Census; 1899 (shown as 1900) 1910-1930; 1930-1950 1980-2000 2010

== Sectors ==
Barrios (which are, in contemporary times, roughly comparable to minor civil divisions) in turn are further subdivided into smaller local populated place areas/units called sectores (sectors in English). The types of sectores may vary, from normally sector to urbanización to reparto to barriada to residencial, among others.

The following sectors are in Daguao barrio:

Parcelas Esperanza, Parcelas Nuevas, Parcelas Viejas, Sector Armando Medina, Sector Cipey, Sector Cuesta Esperanza, Sector Daguao Arriba, Sector El Corcho, Sector Fanguito, Sector Los Millones, Sector Medina, Sector Shangai, Urbanización Casa Bella, Urbanización Hacienda Grande, and Urbanización Promised Land.

== See also ==
- List of communities in Puerto Rico
- List of barrios and sectors of Naguabo, Puerto Rico
