= Mariana, Naguabo, Puerto Rico =

Barrio of Puerto Rico

Mariana
- Barrio
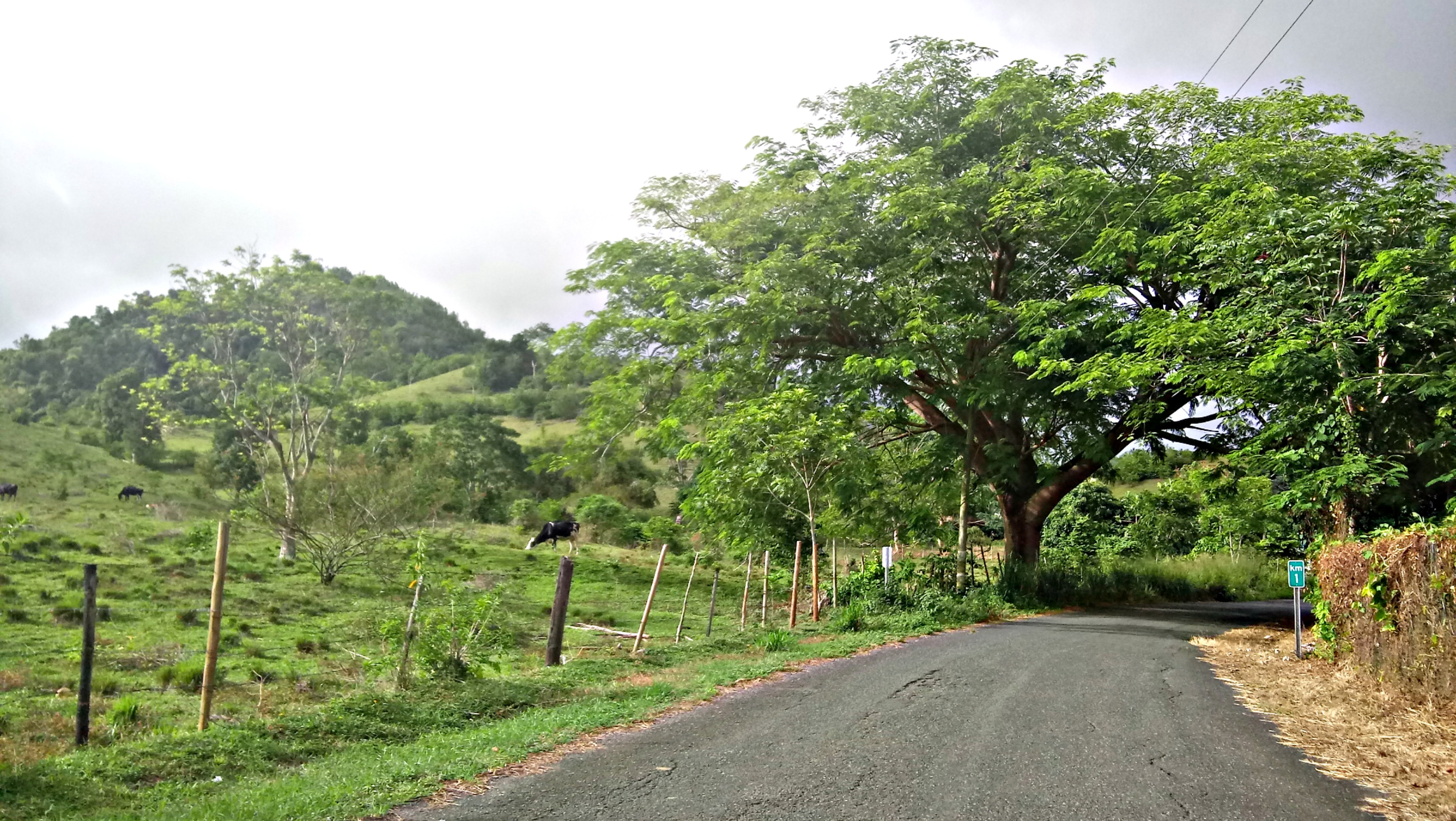
- PR-9974 in Mariana

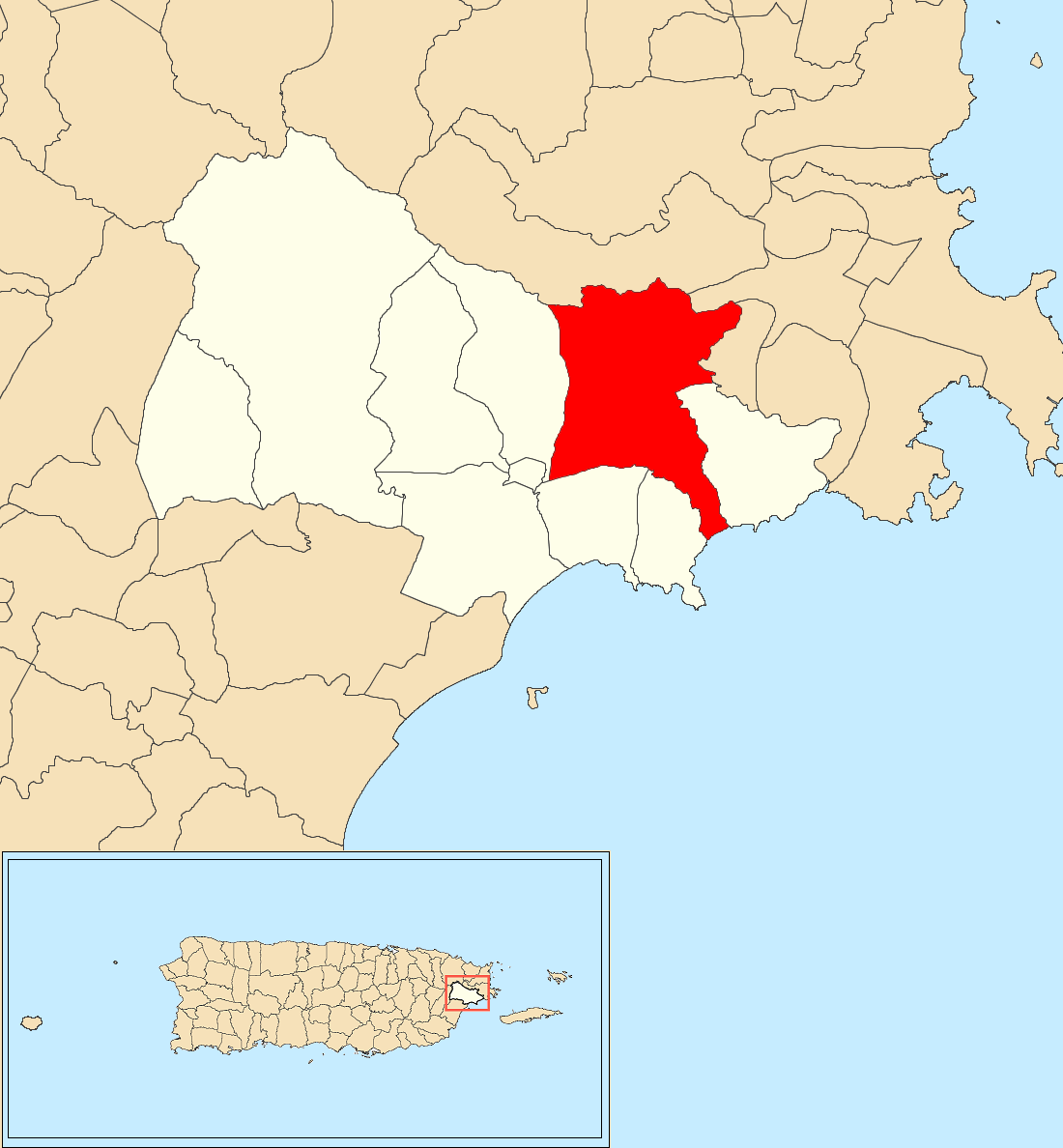
- Location of Mariana within the municipality of Naguabo shown in red

- Location of Puerto Rico
- Coordinates: 18°13′30″N 65°42′22″W
- Commonwealth: Puerto Rico
- Municipality: Naguabo

Area
  - Total: 8.46 sq mi (21.9 km^{2})
  - Land: 7.55 sq mi (19.6 km^{2})
  - Water: 0.91 sq mi (2.4 km^{2})
- Elevation: 758 ft (231 m)

Population (2010)
  - Total: 2,074
  - Density: 274.7/sq mi (106.1/km^{2})
- Source: 2010 Census
- Time zone: UTC−4 (AST)

Mariana is a barrio that is located in the municipality of Naguabo, Puerto Rico. Its population in 2010 was 2,074.

== History ==
Mariana was in Spain's gazetteers until Puerto Rico was ceded by Spain in the aftermath of the Spanish–American War under the terms of the Treaty of Paris of 1898 and became an unincorporated territory of the United States. In 1899, the United States Department of War conducted a census of Puerto Rico finding that the population of Mariana barrio was 1,280.

Historical population
Census	Pop.	Note	%±
1900	1,280		—
1910	1,648		28.8%
1920	2,010		22.0%
1930	2,107		4.8%
1940	1,839		−12.7%
1950	2,678		45.6%
1960	1,648		−38.5%
1970	1,407		−14.6%
1980	1,450		3.1%
1990	1,647		13.6%
2000	1,726		4.8%
2010	2,074		20.2%
U.S. Decennial Census; 1899 (shown as 1900) 1910-1930; 1930-1950 1980-2000 2010

== Sectors ==
Barrios (which are, in contemporary times, roughly comparable to minor civil divisions) in turn are further subdivided into smaller local populated place areas/units called sectores (sectors in English). The types of sectores may vary, from normally sector to urbanización to reparto to barriada to residencial, among others.

The following sectors are in Mariana barrio:

Barriada Ensanche Relámpago, Comunidad Finquitas, Parcelas Mariana, Quebrada Palma, Sector Agosto, Sector Alturas de Mariana (Sector Santiago y Lima), Sector Arenas Blancas, Sector Botijita, Sector Daguao Arriba, Sector El Banco, Sector José Lima, Sector La Coroza, Sector La Paloma, Sector La Vega, Sector Las Malangas, Sector Limones, Sector Los Romanes, Sector Marzot, and Sector Rincón.

== See also ==
- List of communities in Puerto Rico
- List of barrios and sectors of Naguabo, Puerto Rico
