= Río Blanco, Naguabo, Puerto Rico =

Barrio of Puerto Rico

Río Blanco
- Barrio
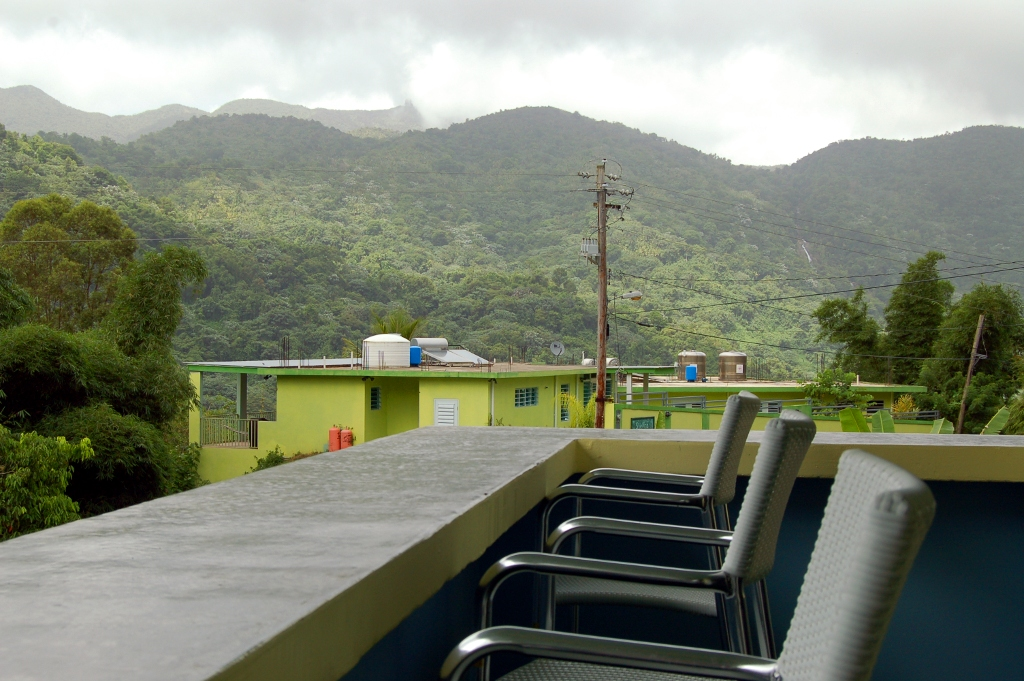
- El Yunque National Forest from Sector Cubuy in Río Blanco

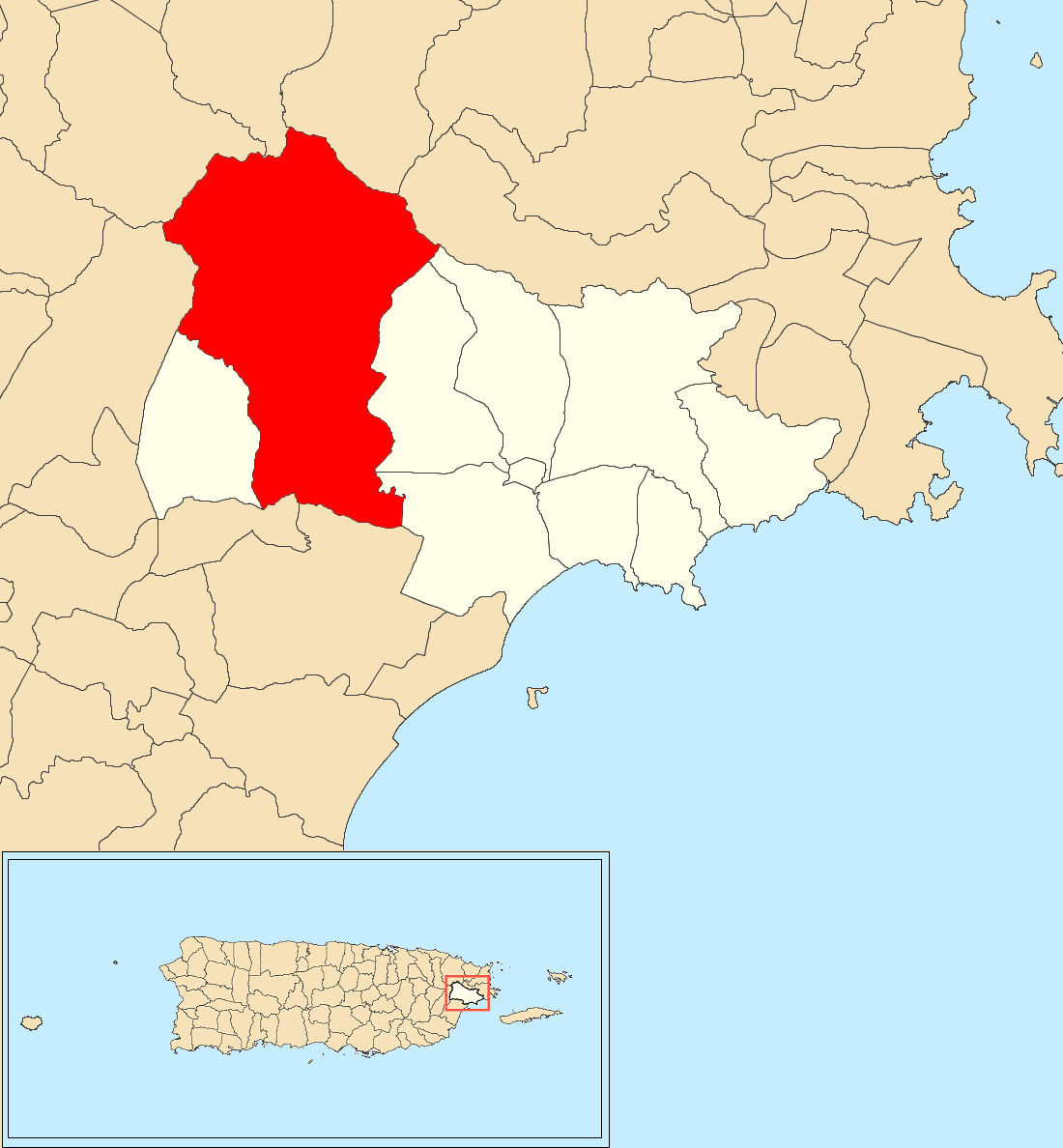
- Location of Río Blanco within the municipality of Naguabo shown in red

- Location of Puerto Rico
- Coordinates: 18°15′06″N 65°47′26″W
- Commonwealth: Puerto Rico
- Municipality: Naguabo

Area
  - Total: 17.10 sq mi (44.3 km^{2})
  - Land: 17.09 sq mi (44.3 km^{2})
  - Water: 0.01 sq mi (0.026 km^{2})
- Elevation: 797 ft (243 m)

Population (2010)
  - Total: 3,412
  - Density: 199.6/sq mi (77.1/km^{2})
- Source: 2010 Census
- Time zone: UTC−4 (AST)

Río Blanco is a barrio in the municipality of Naguabo, Puerto Rico. Its population in 2010 was 3,412.

== History ==
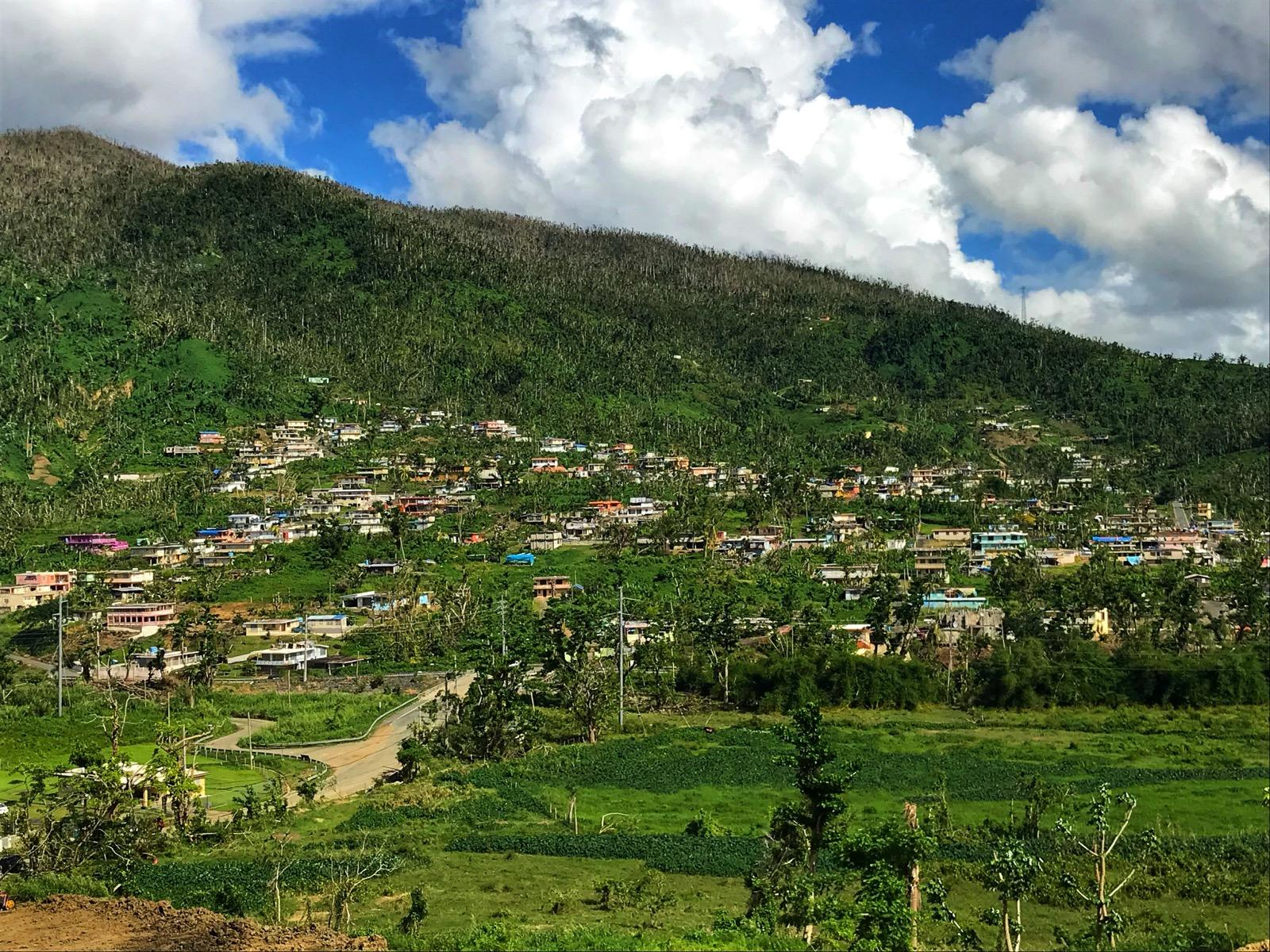
Río Blanco in 2017

Río Blanco was in Spain's gazetteers until Puerto Rico was ceded by Spain in the aftermath of the Spanish–American War under the terms of the Treaty of Paris of 1898 and became an unincorporated territory of the United States. In 1899, the United States Department of War conducted a census of Puerto Rico finding that the population of Río Blanco Abajo barrio was 976 and Río Blanco Arriba barrio was 959.

Historical population
Census	Pop.	Note	%±
1900	1,935		—
1910	2,033		5.1%
1920	2,361		16.1%
1930	2,823		19.6%
1940	3,199		13.3%
1950	2,991		−6.5%
1960	2,665		−10.9%
1970	2,659		−0.2%
1980	3,065		15.3%
1990	3,191		4.1%
2000	3,235		1.4%
2010	3,412		5.5%
U.S. Decennial Census; 1899 (shown as 1900) 1910-1930; 1930-1950 1980-2000 2010

== Sectors ==
Barrios (which are, in contemporary times, roughly comparable to minor civil divisions) in turn are further subdivided into smaller local populated place areas/units called sectores (sectors in English). The types of sectores may vary, from normally sector to urbanización to reparto to barriada to residencial, among others.

The following sectors are in Río Blanco barrio:

Finca San Eladio, Parcelas Río Blanco, Parcelas Sector Común, Sector Camino Viejo, Sector Común, Sector Cubuy, Sector El Fuego, Sector El Puente, Sector Florida, Sector La Cuchilla, Sector La Joba, Sector La Mina, Sector Río Blanco Arriba, Urbanización Río Blanco Heights, and Urbanización Vistas de Río Blanco.

== See also ==
- List of communities in Puerto Rico
- List of barrios and sectors of Naguabo, Puerto Rico
