= Río, Naguabo, Puerto Rico =

Barrio of Puerto Rico

Río
- Barrio
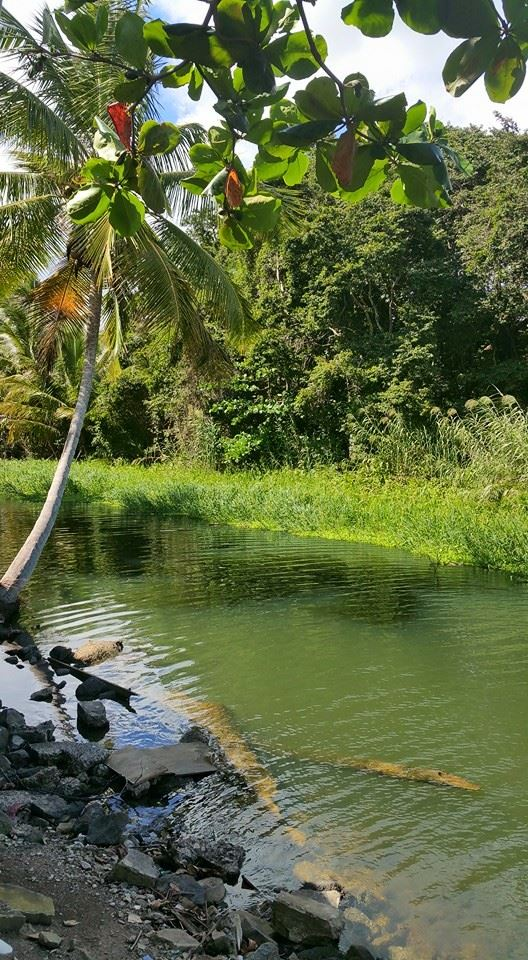
- Santiago River between Río and Húcares

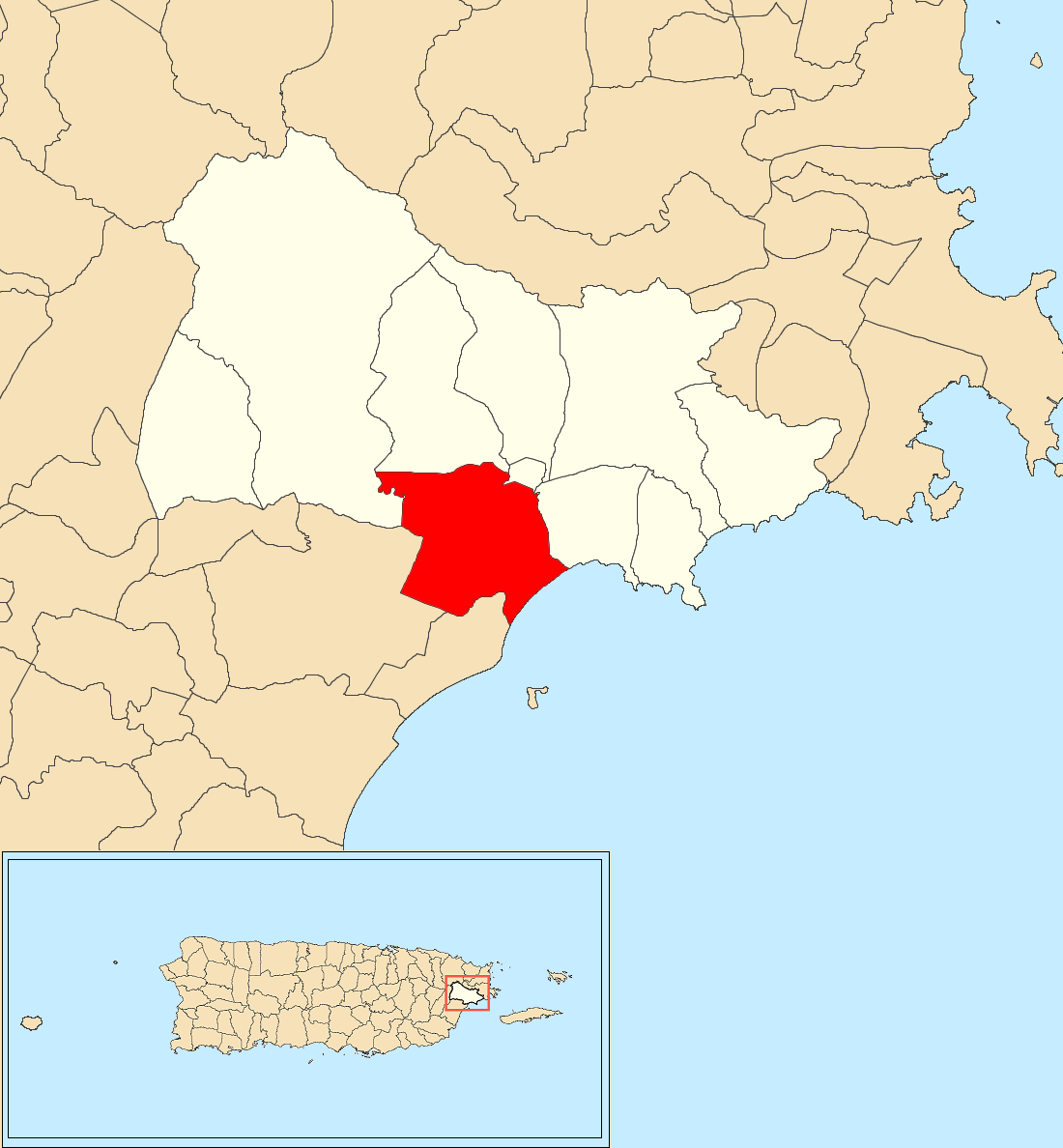
- Location of Río within the municipality of Naguabo shown in red

- Location of Puerto Rico
- Coordinates: 18°11′08″N 65°45′02″W
- Commonwealth: Puerto Rico
- Municipality: Naguabo

Area
  - Total: 7.90 sq mi (20.5 km^{2})
  - Land: 5.04 sq mi (13.1 km^{2})
  - Water: 2.86 sq mi (7.4 km^{2})
- Elevation: 3 ft (0.91 m)

Population (2010)
  - Total: 5,350
  - Density: 1,061.5/sq mi (409.8/km^{2})
- Source: 2010 Census
- Time zone: UTC−4 (AST)

Río is a barrio in the municipality of Naguabo, Puerto Rico. Its population in 2010 was 5,350.

== History ==
Río was in Spain's gazetteers until Puerto Rico was ceded by Spain in the aftermath of the Spanish–American War under the terms of the Treaty of Paris of 1898 and became an unincorporated territory of the United States. In 1899, the United States Department of War conducted a census of Puerto Rico finding that the combined population of Río and Santiago y Lima barrios was 902.

Historical population
Census	Pop.	Note	%±
1910	533		—
1920	808		51.6%
1930	788		−2.5%
1940	793		0.6%
1950	1,099		38.6%
1960	812		−26.1%
1970	0		−100.0%
1980	2,604		—
1990	2,776		6.6%
2000	3,010		8.4%
2010	5,350		77.7%
U.S. Decennial Census; 1900 (N/A) 1910-1930; 1930-1950 1980-2000 2010

== Sectors ==
Barrios (which are, in contemporary times, roughly comparable to minor civil divisions) in turn are further subdivided into smaller local populated place areas/units called sectores (sectors in English). The types of sectores may vary, from normally sector to urbanización to reparto to barriada to residencial, among others.

The following sectors are in Río barrio:

Extensión Diplo, Extensión Diplo III, Residencial Torres del Río, Residencial Villa del Río, Row House, Sector Brazo Seco, Urbanización Brisas del Valle, Urbanización Ciudad Dorada, Urbanización Jardines de la Esperanza, Urbanización Praderas del Este, Urbanización Ramón Rivero, Urbanización Tropical Beach, and Urbanización Vistas de Naguabo.

== See also ==
- List of communities in Puerto Rico
- List of barrios and sectors of Naguabo, Puerto Rico
