= Naguabo, Puerto Rico =

Town and municipality in Puerto Rico

Naguabo Municipio Autónomo de Naguabo
- Town and Municipality
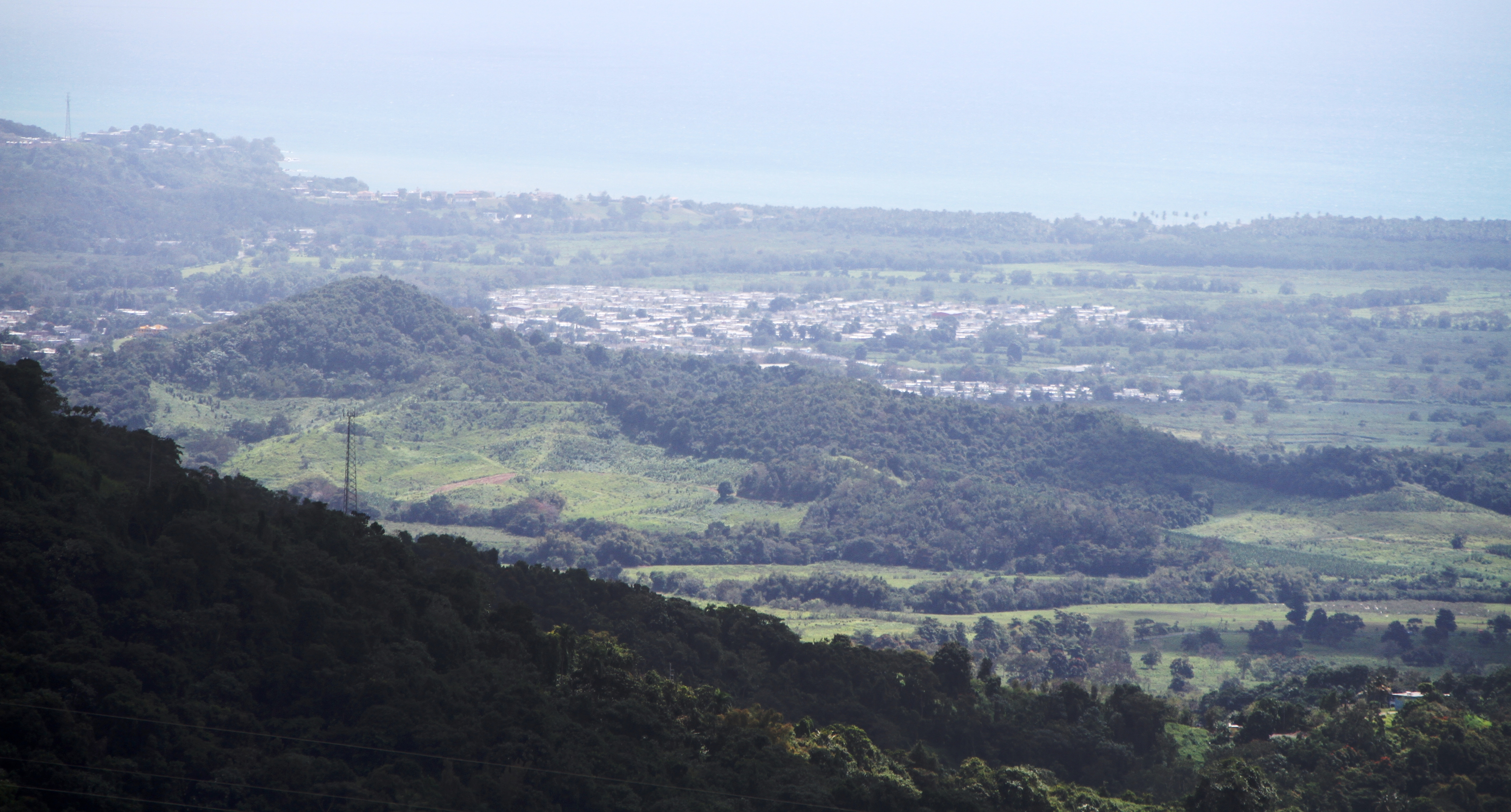
- View of Naguabo from El Yunque

- Flag Coat of arms
- Nicknames: "Cuna de Grandes Artistas", "Los Enchumbaos"
- Anthem: "Mi Naguabo del querer, Mi Naguabo del soñar"
- Map of Puerto Rico highlighting Naguabo Municipality
- Coordinates: 18°13′10″N 65°44′12″W
- Sovereign state: United States
- Commonwealth: Puerto Rico
- Settled: 1794
- Founded: July 15, 1821
- Founder: Luis de Gaztambide, Juan Viera, Antonio Viera, and Juan Méndez
- Barrios: 10 barrios: Daguao; Duque; Húcares; Maizales; Mariana; Naguabo barrio-pueblo; Peña Pobre; Río; Río Blanco; Santiago y Lima

Government
  - Mayor: Miraidaliz Rosario Pagán (PPD)
  - Senatorial dist.: 7 - Humacao
  - Representative dist.: 35

Area
  - Total: 60.07 sq mi (155.57 km^{2})
  - Land: 52 sq mi (135 km^{2})
  - Water: 7.94 sq mi (20.57 km^{2})

Population (2020)
  - Total: 23,386
  - Estimate (2025): 22,666 ▼
  - Rank: 52nd in Puerto Rico
  - Density: 449/sq mi (173/km^{2})
- Demonym: Naguabeños
- Time zone: UTC−4 (AST)
- ZIP Codes: 00718, 00744
- Area code: 787/939

Naguabo (Spanish pronunciation: [naˈɣwaβo], locally [naˈwaβo]) is a town and municipality in Puerto Rico located in the east coast of the island bordered by the Vieques Passage, north of Humacao; south of Río Grande and Ceiba; and east of Las Piedras. Naguabo is spread over eight barrios and Naguabo Pueblo (the downtown area and the administrative center of the city). The municipality is composed of the barrios of Daguao, Río, Mariana, Peña Pobre, Pueblo, Río Blanco, Maizales, Santiago y Lima, and Duque. It is part of the San Juan-Caguas-Guaynabo Metropolitan Statistical Area.

Naguabo is renowned as the birthplace of the pastelillo de chapín, a popular dish in Puerto Rico. It is trunkfish wrapped inside deep-fried flour dough. Pastelillos de chapín can be found in almost any seaside establishment on the island. It is derived from the Taíno term Daguao, and the nickname "El Pueblo de los Enchumbaos" -an expression meaning "soaked"- comes from the abundant water sources and frequent rain. The latter is due to Naguabo's proximity to El Yunque, a large rainforest reserve.

== History ==
The first settlement in the area, Santiago, was built in 1513 near the Río Daguao with the intent of warding off Carib incursions. The Spanish failed in this task and abandoned it a year later. The current town of Naguabo was resettled in 1794 near a ravine on the east coast and relocated in 1821 to its current location. In 1878, Naguabo had the following barrios: Pueblo, Maizales, Duque, Mariana, Quebrada Palma, Daguao, Santiago y Lima, Húcares, Río, Peña Pobre and Río Blanco. In 1521, Daguao was burned down by Caribs.

Puerto Rico was ceded by Spain in the aftermath of the Spanish–American War under the terms of the Treaty of Paris of 1898 and became a territory of the United States. In 1899, the United States Department of War conducted a census of Puerto Rico, finding that the population of Naguabo was 10,873. By 2008, the estimated population was 24,803.

On September 20, 2017, Hurricane Maria struck Puerto Rico. In Naguabo, the sector Playa Húcares on the coast was the most affected, with most homes destroyed or losing their roofs. The boardwalk was destroyed, and over 6,000 people reported losses.

== Geography ==
Naguabo is located in the southeast region of Puerto Rico. The highest point in the municipality is Pico del Este in the Sierra de Luquillo at 3,419 feet (1,042 m) of elevation.

Río Blanco and Río Espíritu Santo are located in Naguabo. The Río Blanco river runs through Naguabo, ending in the Caribbean Sea near the municipal port. Nearby, there is a recreational center named Centro Yudelmi. In the zone, there are also Taíno petroglyphs carved into the stones. The river is born from Río Cubuy, which originates in Luquillo Lago Punta Lima and the mangroves of Bahía Corcho are also within its jurisdiction.

=== Barrios ===
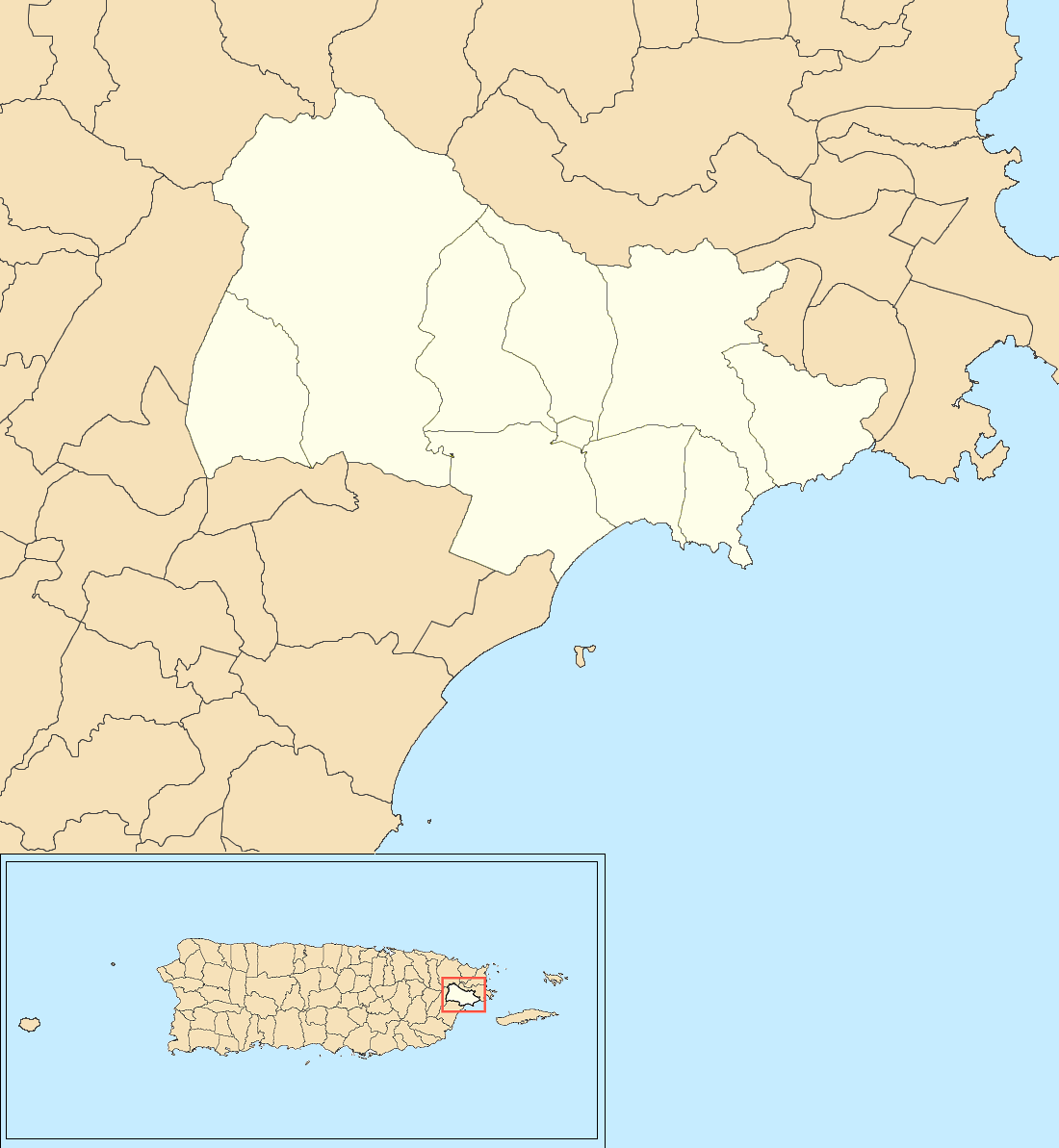
Subdivisions of Naguabo.

Like all municipalities of Puerto Rico, Naguabo is subdivided into barrios. The municipal buildings, central square and large Catholic church are located in a barrio referred to as "el pueblo".

1. Daguao
2. Duque
3. Húcares
4. Maizales
5. Mariana
6. Naguabo barrio-pueblo
7. Peña Pobre
8. Río
9. Río Blanco
10. Santiago y Lima

=== Sectors ===
Barrios (which are, in contemporary times, roughly comparable to minor civil divisions) and subbarrios, are further subdivided into smaller areas called sectores (sectors in English). The types of sectores may vary, from normally sector to urbanización to reparto to barriada to residencial, among others.

=== Special Communities ===
Comunidades Especiales de Puerto Rico (Special Communities of Puerto Rico) are marginalized communities whose citizens experience some degree of social exclusion. A map shows that these communities occur in nearly every municipality of the commonwealth. Of the 742 places that were on the list in 2014, the following barrios, communities, sectors, or neighborhoods were in Naguabo: Relámpago neighborhood, Río, Santiago y Lima, Daguao, La Florida, Casco Urbano in barrio-pueblo, Húcares, Maizales, Parcelas La Fe, and Río Blanco.

== Demographics ==
Historical population
| Census | Pop. | Note | %± |
|---|---|---|---|
| 1900 | 10,873 | | — |
| 1910 | 14,365 | | 32.1% |
| 1920 | 15,788 | | 9.9% |
| 1930 | 18,212 | | 15.4% |
| 1940 | 19,180 | | 5.3% |
| 1950 | 21,019 | | 9.6% |
| 1960 | 17,195 | | −18.2% |
| 1970 | 17,996 | | 4.7% |
| 1980 | 20,617 | | 14.6% |
| 1990 | 22,620 | | 9.7% |
| 2000 | 23,753 | | 5.0% |
| 2010 | 26,720 | | 12.5% |
| 2020 | 23,386 | | −12.5% |
| 2025 (est.) | 22,666 | ▼ | −3.1% |
U.S. Decennial Census; 1899 (shown as 1900) 1910-1930; 1930-1950 1960-2000 2010 2020

Its nickname, Pueblo de los Artistas, comes from several figures born there, including Carmen Delia Dipini and Cuqui Torres. Independence militant Filiberto Ojeda Ríos, political figure Inés Mendoza, and athlete Elmer Williams were also born at Naguabo. Both Diplo and Flores have yearly events held in their honor by the municipal government. Near the original settlement of Santiago is Daguao, the area with the highest Afro-Caribbean population in the municipality.

== Tourism ==
=== Landmarks and places of interest ===
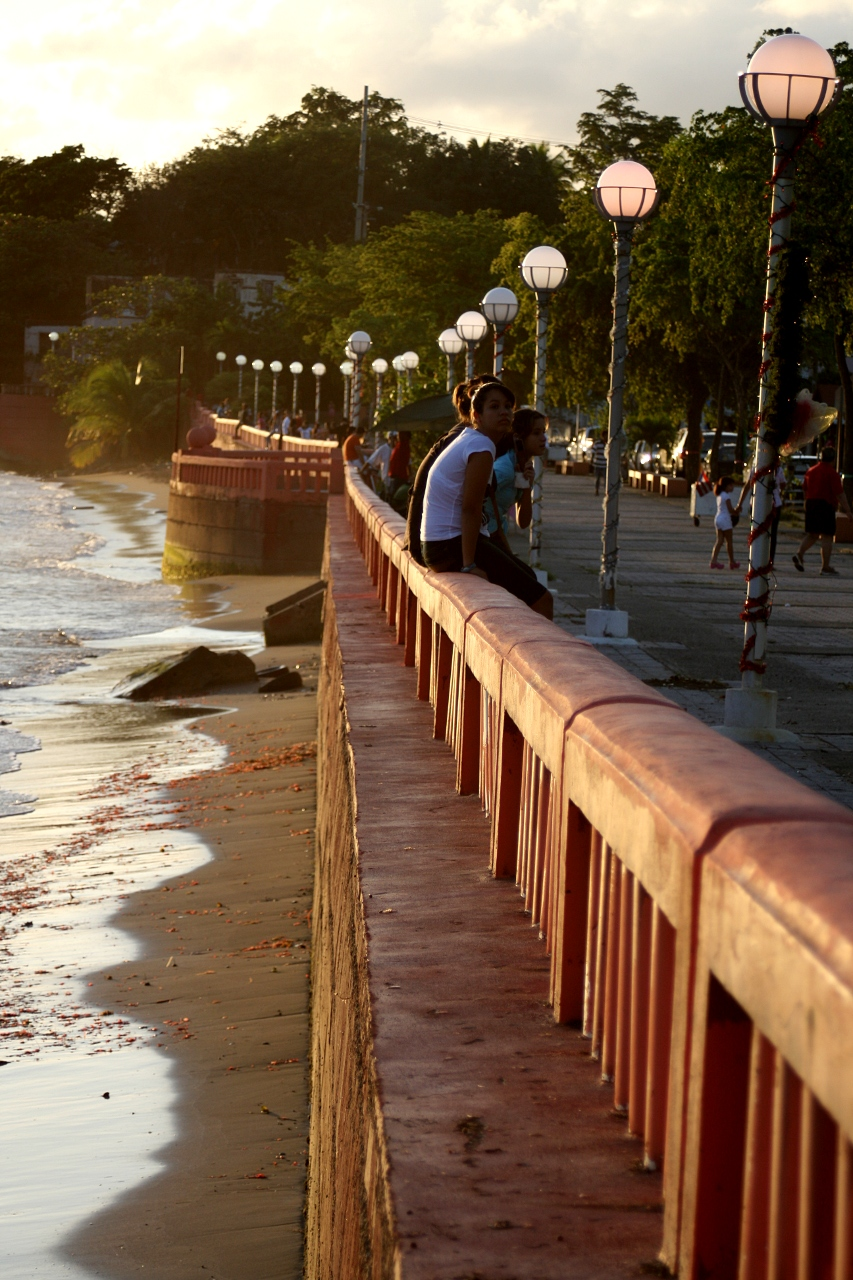
Beach, boardwalk, street lamps and people in Naguabo

There are 31 beaches in Naguabo.

Near the Humacao coastal border lies Playa Tropical, a popular spot for surfers and other aquatic sports enthusiasts. Sea turtles regularly make their nests on the coast of the area known as La Fansuca, from which the name is derived. After being rescued and healed, Moíses (a manatee that gained celebrity status during the 1990s) was freed in the zone, being often sighted at Bahía El Corcho in Daguao. Besides these sea mammals the bay also houses several species of mangroves, birds and fish.

The main attractions in Naguabo are:

- Algodones Key
- El Yunque National Forest (South Side via PR State Road 191 - Closed at KM 13 (mile marker 8.1) (approx.) due to Road Closure)
- Naguabo Beach
- Punta Lima Beach
- Ramón Rivero "Diplo" Monument
- Tropical Beach
- Yudelmi Center
- Pedro Flores Monument
- Hucares Waterfront (El Malecón - the boardwalk)
- the main town square (Plaza De Recreo)
- Charco El Hippie, an area popular for its clear water river, waterfalls and rock formations such as La Lunita.

=== Buildings ===
City Hall was built in 1929. The town church was built between 1841 and 1856. A 1900 Victorian-style building known as El Castillo Villa Del Mar, found at Playa Húcares, is recognized as a historic building and is on the national register. A structure from 1920 was refurbished to house the municipal theatre, named after Diplo. Other ancient buildings have been restored to house shops and a bank, the municipal gym building dates back to 1923. The ruins of a historic lighthouse are managed by the municipal government.

Modern additions include a set of statues depicting Diplo and Pedro Flores that adorn the municipal plaza. The Malecón was built in 1990 and borders Naguabo's Bahía del Malecón, which is near the municipal pier and surrounded by food and artisanal businesses. A stadium and coliseum are used to house sports, while another coliseum is specifically used to house cock fights. The Plaza de Recreo hosts an acoustic shell. A small fraction of the derelict military base formerly known as Roosevelt Roads is located at Daguao.

=== Natural reserves ===
The Bosque Urbano, a small forest found within the municipality's centre, houses tropical species, including the endangered ceiba. The protected El Islote de Naguabo is a bird and reptile reserve. Cayo Santiago was settled by pre-Columbian civilizations that left remains there. It was later used as a refuge by pirates and other outlaws. In 1938, a population of monkeys was introduced for scientific purposes. Their population has since grown, reaching more than a thousand individuals at its peak. Cayo Santiago has also become a tourist spot, with trips being offered by boat to the area adjacent to it and other keys.

Cayo Algodones houses the eponymous and Punta Lima bays and serves as a nesting spot for herons, also features many rock formations that are tourist attractions, one shaped like a cocodrile's head (Piedra Zumbadora) and another tied to local folklore (Piedra del Indio). Reefs and a submerged rock colloquially known as Piedra Ahogada require particular attention while navigating the zone of Cayo Algodones.

== Culture ==
=== Festivals and events ===
Naguabo celebrates its patron saint festival in October. The Fiestas Patronales de Nuestra Virgen del Rosario is a religious and cultural celebration that generally features parades, games, artisans, amusement rides, regional food, and live entertainment.

Other festivals and events celebrated in Naguabo include:

- Maratón Cervecero en Naguabo - January
- Chapín Festival - February, held to celebrate the municipality's fishing tradition.
- Pedro Flores Week - March
- Diplo Festival - June
- Virgen del Carmen Fiesta - July 16

== Economy ==
Fishing is one of the municipality's main economic activities, and has been a historical anchor of its local economy. Naguabo runs an industrial, agricultural (it produces coffee, coconut, sugar cane, Malpighia emarginata, among others) and cattle economy. By 2008, ecotourism was on the rise.

== Symbols ==
The municipio has an official flag and coat of arms.

=== Flag ===
This municipality has a flag.

=== Coat of arms ===
This municipality has a coat of arms.

== Transportation ==
A trolley offers public transportation in Naguabo. It operates from 6:00 a.m. using the "Pisicorre" bus. There are 52 bridges in Naguabo.

== Government ==
A mayor administers all municipalities in Puerto Rico and is elected every four years. The current mayor of Naguabo is Miraidaliz Rosario Pagán, of the Popular Democratic Party (PPD). She was first elected at the 2020 general elections.

The city belongs to the Puerto Rico Senatorial district VII, which two Senators represent. In 2024, Wanda Soto Tolentino and Luis Daniel Colón La Santa were elected as District Senators.

== Books about Naguabo ==
Historia de Naguabo by Carmelo Rosario Natal

== Gallery ==
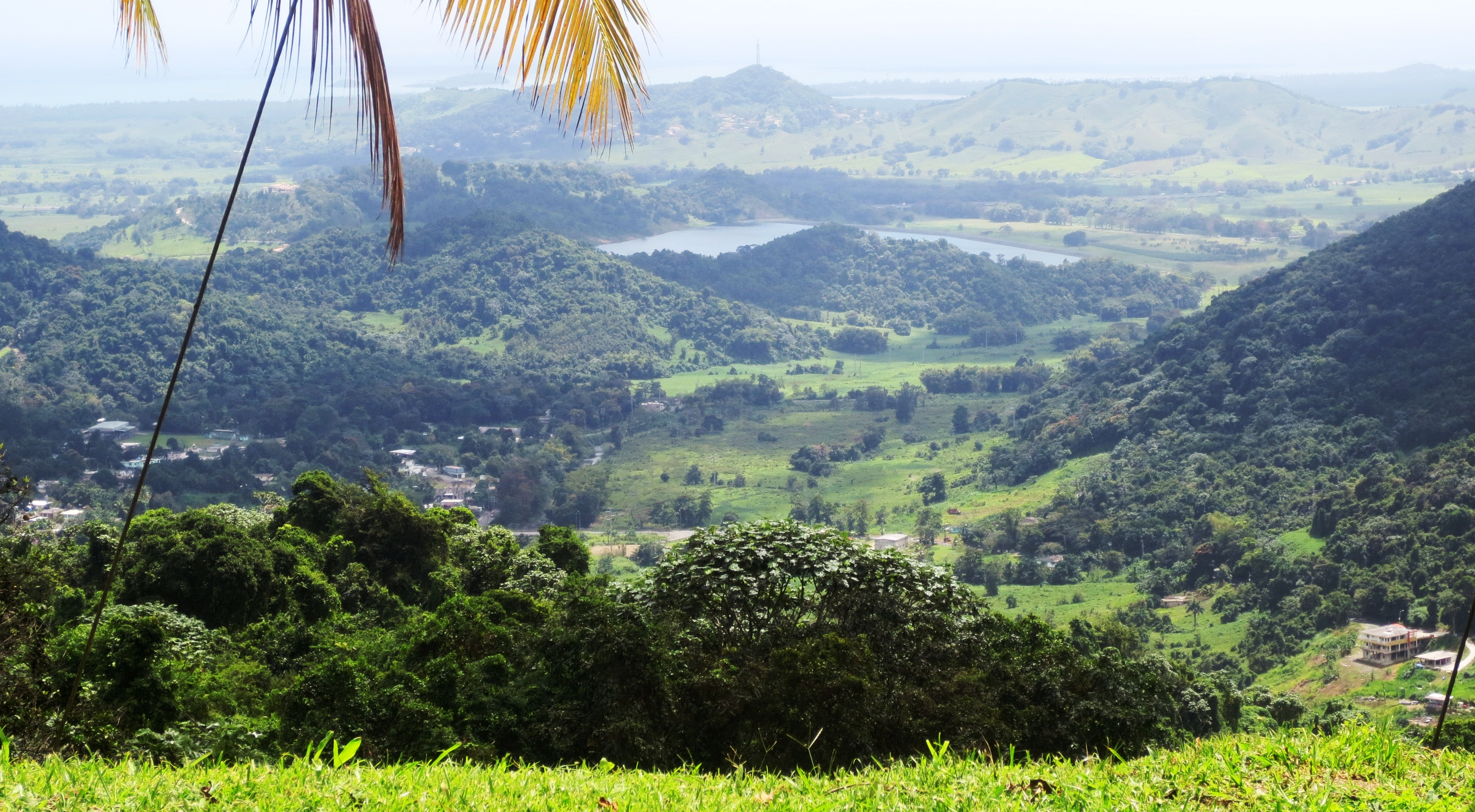
Río Blanco reservoir in Naguabo

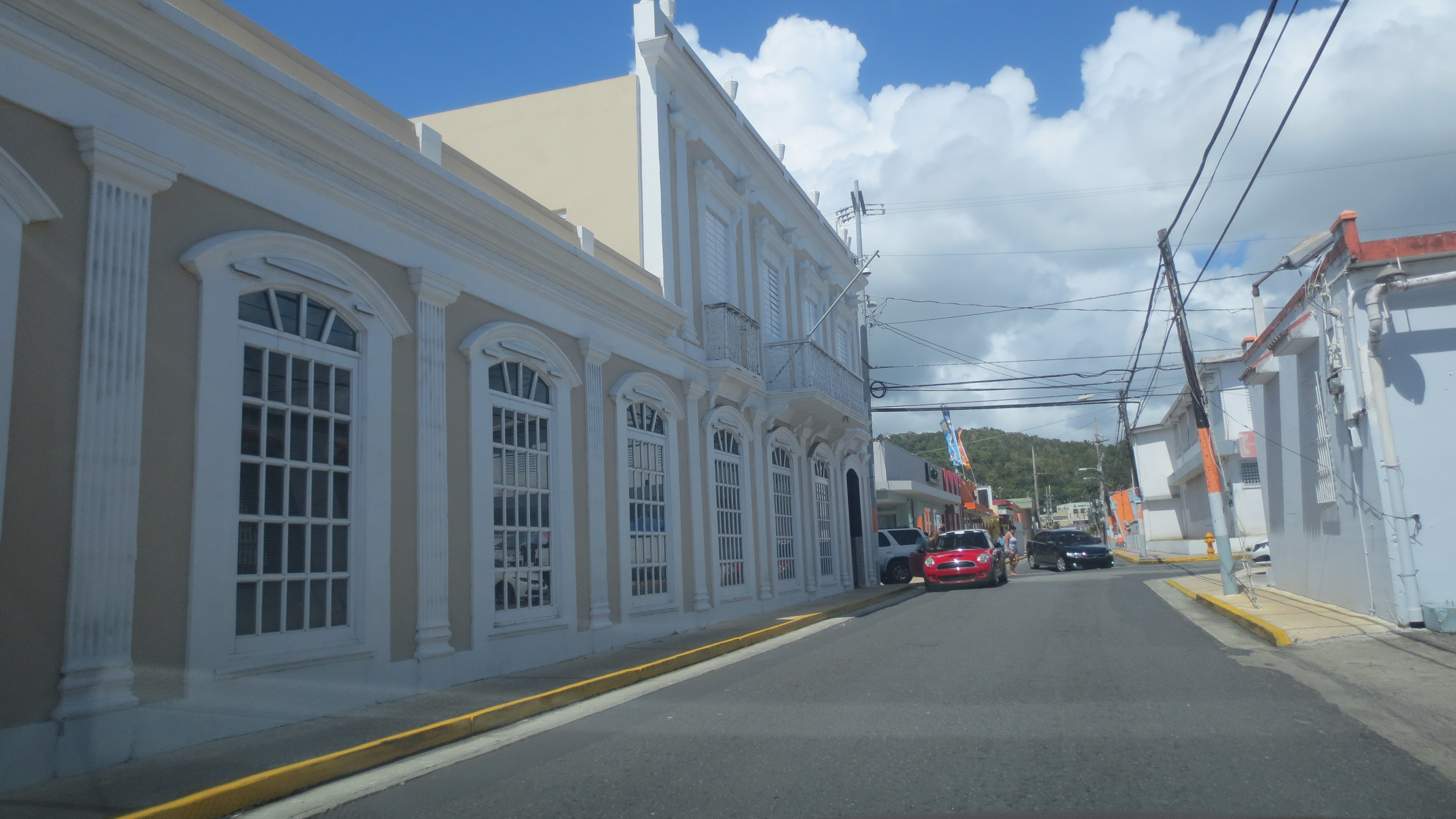
Street in Naguabo

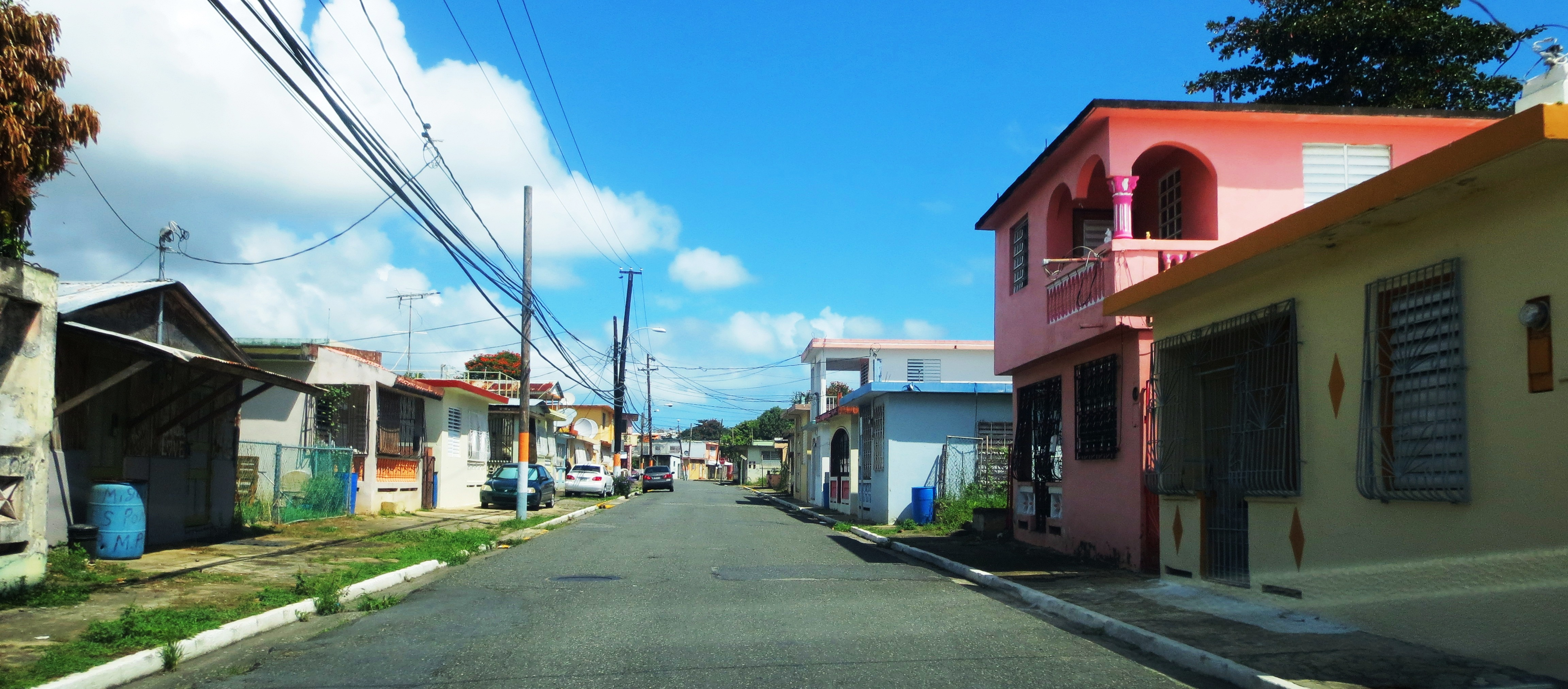
Residential street in Naguabo

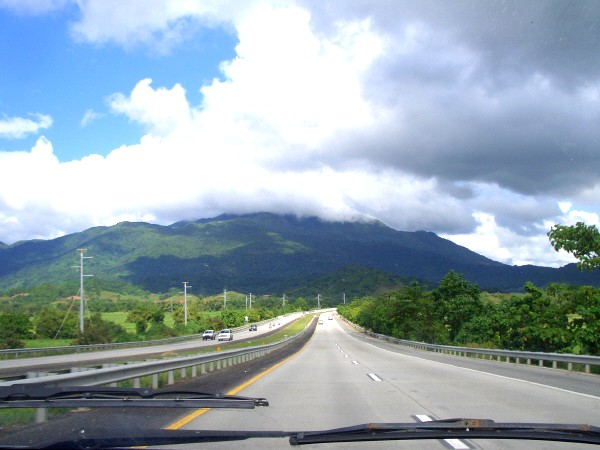
Highway from Naguabo to Ceiba

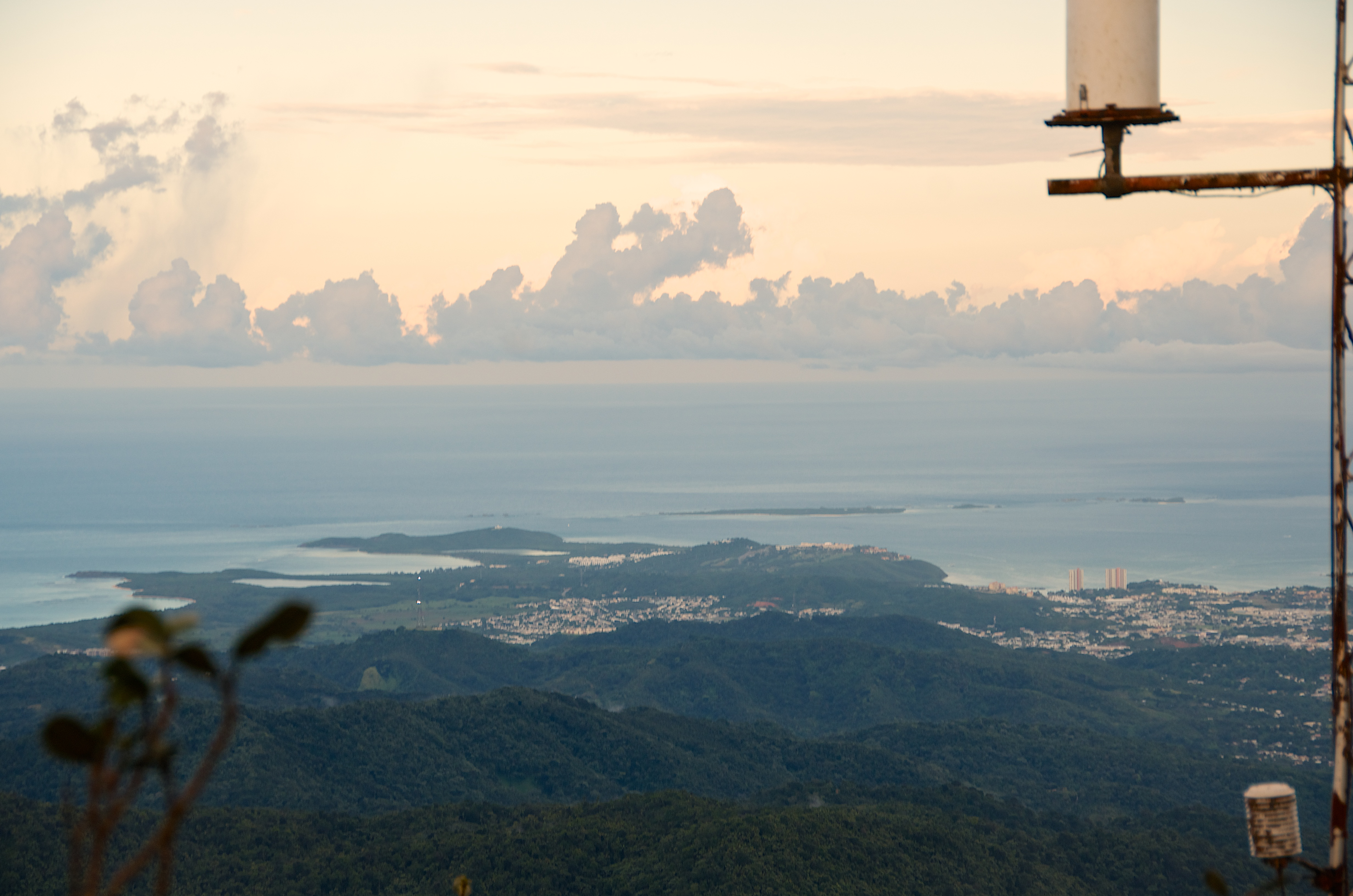
Northeast Puerto Rico from atop El Yunque

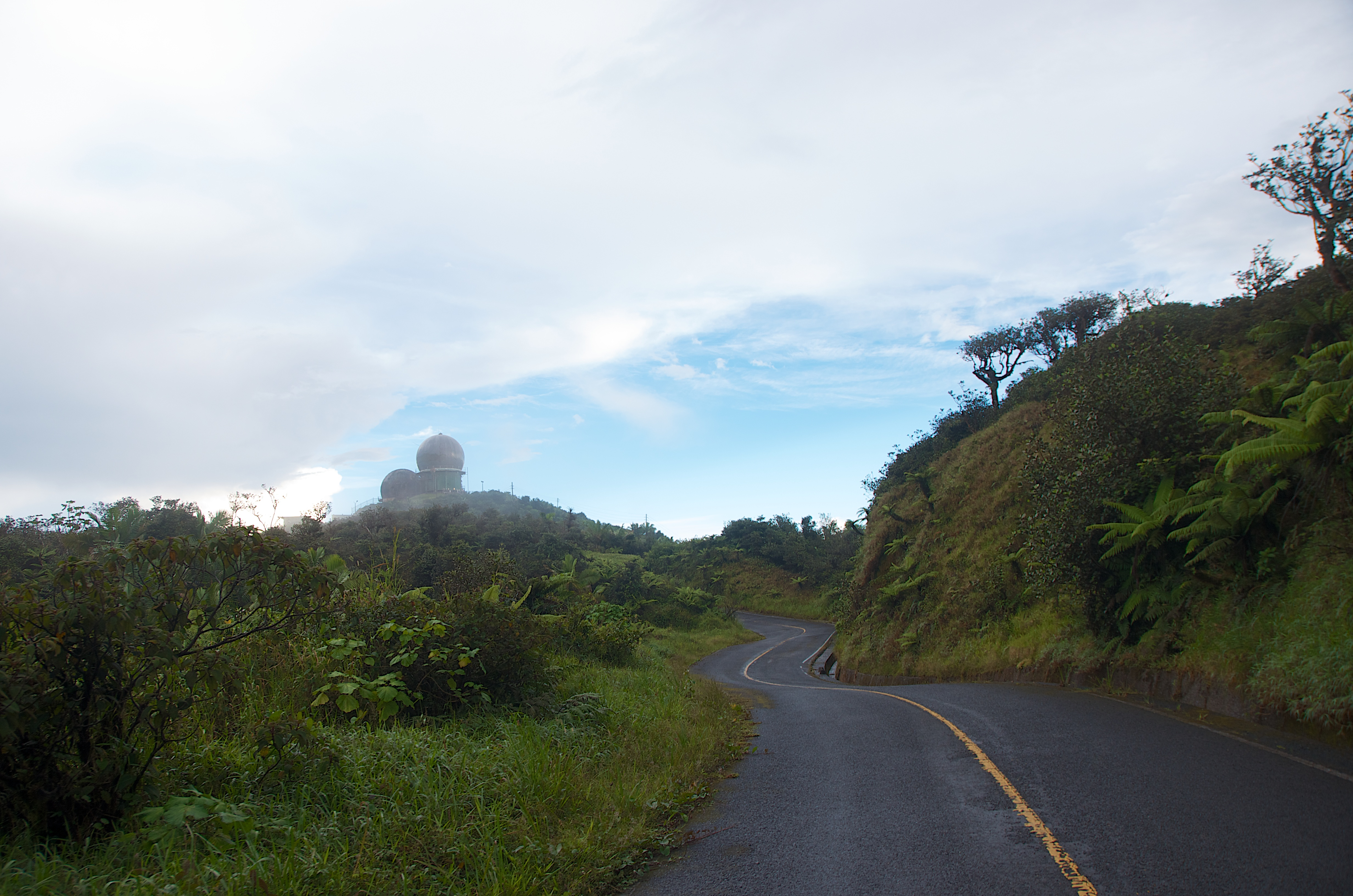
Radar towers in Naguabo

== See also ==
- List of Puerto Ricans
- History of Puerto Rico
- Did you know-Puerto Rico?
