= Maizales =

Barrio of Naguabo, Puerto Rico

- Barrio
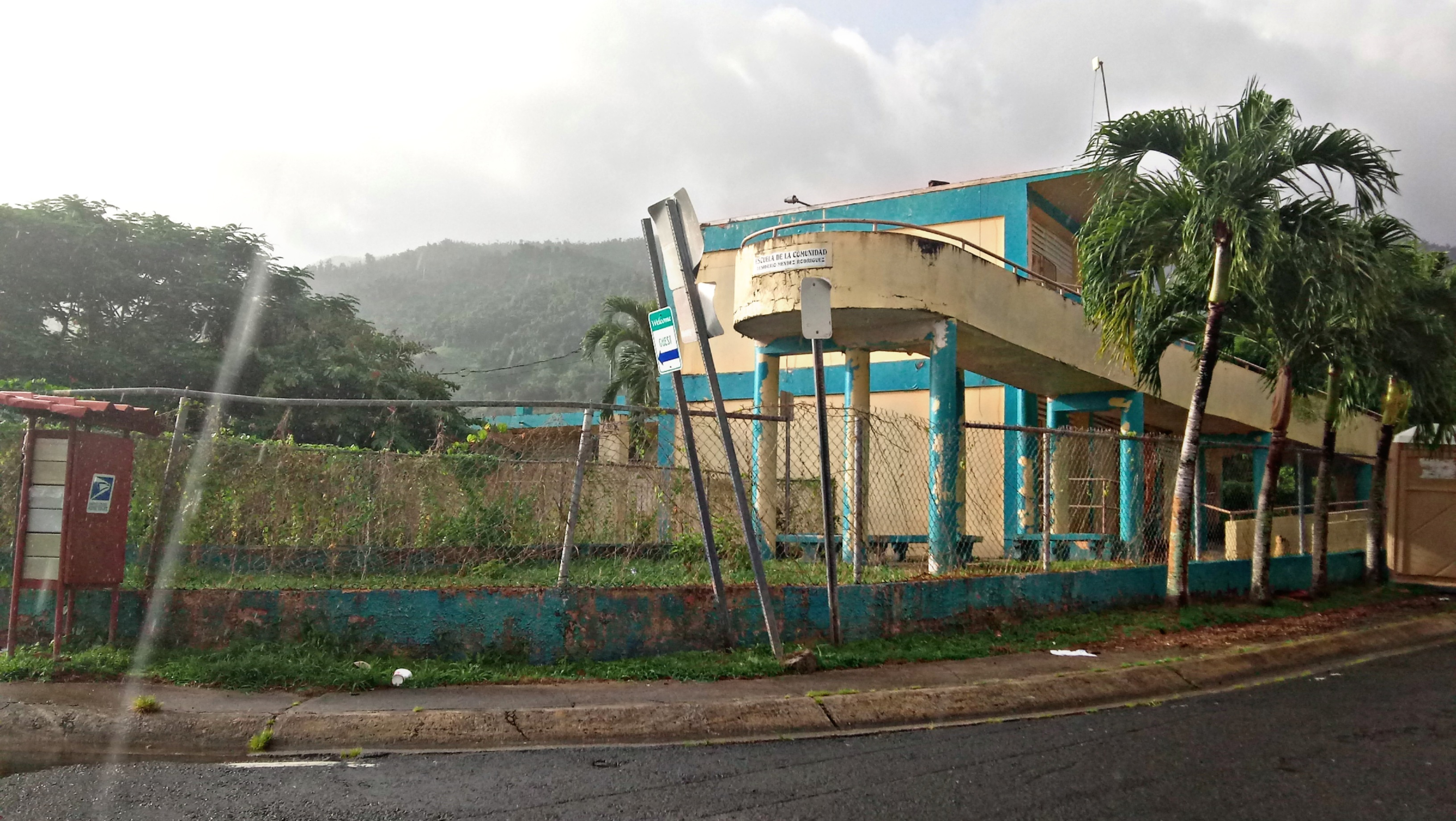
- An elevated walkway at Desiderio Mendez Rodríguez School in Maizalez

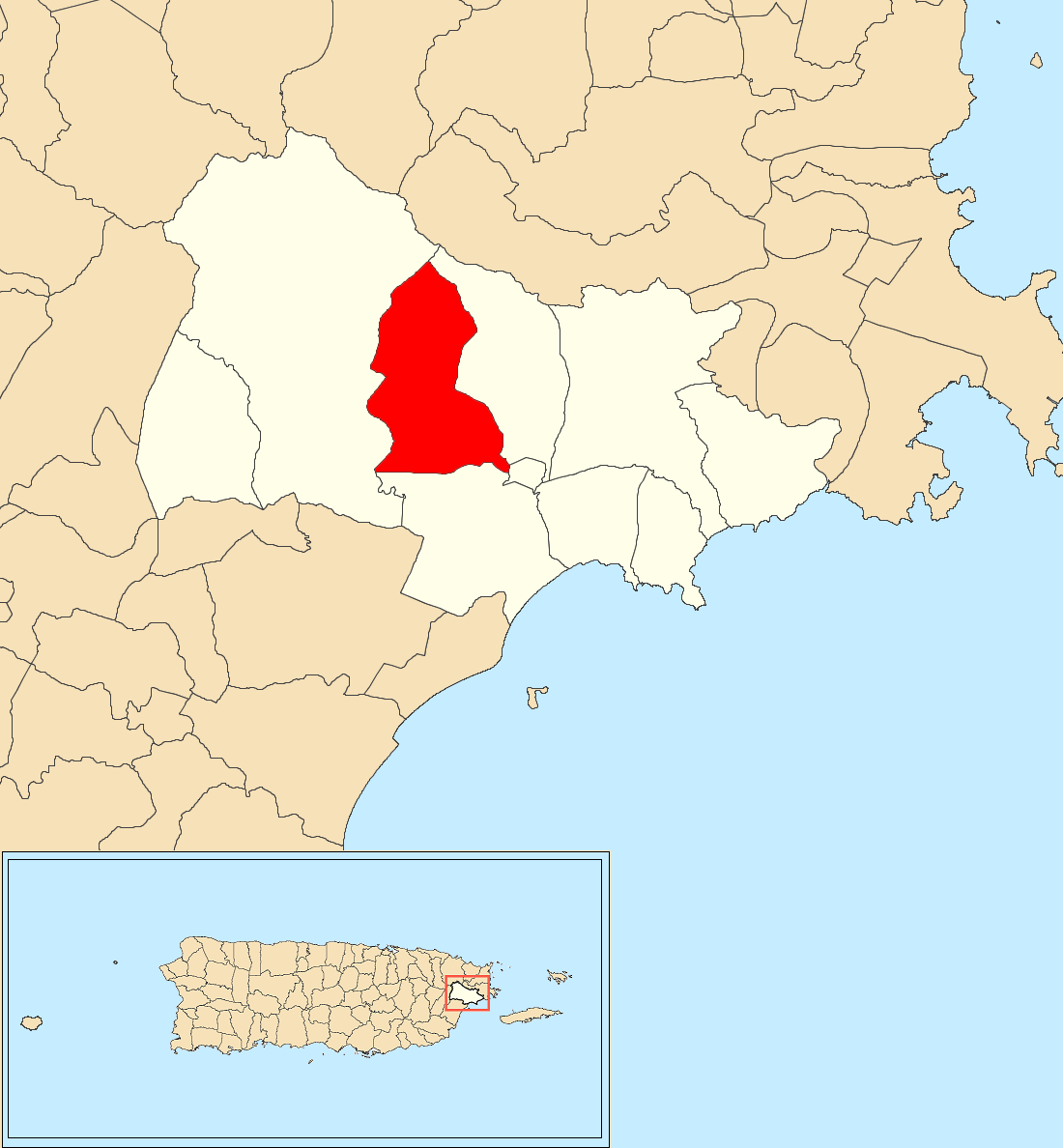
- Location of Maizales within the municipality of Naguabo shown in red

- Location of Puerto Rico
- Coordinates: 18°14′01″N 65°45′33″W
- Commonwealth: Puerto Rico
- Municipality: Naguabo

Area
  - Total: 4.95 sq mi (12.8 km^{2})
  - Land: 4.95 sq mi (12.8 km^{2})
  - Water: 0 sq mi (0 km^{2})
- Elevation: 161 ft (49 m)

Population (2010)
  - Total: 1,913
  - Density: 386.5/sq mi (149.2/km^{2})
- Source: 2010 Census
- Time zone: UTC−4 (AST)

Maizales is a barrio in the municipality of Naguabo, Puerto Rico. Its population in 2010 was 1,913.

== History ==
Maizales was in Spain's gazetteers until Puerto Rico was ceded by Spain in the aftermath of the Spanish–American War under the terms of the Treaty of Paris of 1898 and became an unincorporated territory of the United States. In 1899, the United States Department of War conducted a census of Puerto Rico finding that the population of Maizales barrio was 1,060.

Historical population
Census	Pop.	Note	%±
1900	1,060		—
1910	1,036		−2.3%
1920	1,269		22.5%
1930	1,627		28.2%
1940	1,576		−3.1%
1950	2,065		31.0%
1960	1,296		−37.2%
1970	0		−100.0%
1980	1,261		—
1990	1,739		37.9%
2000	2,120		21.9%
2010	1,913		−9.8%
U.S. Decennial Census; 1899 (shown as 1900) 1910-1930; 1930-1950 1980-2000 2010

== Sectors ==
Barrios (which are, in contemporary times, roughly comparable to minor civil divisions) in turn are further subdivided into smaller local populated place areas/units called sectores (sectors in English). The types of sectores may vary, from normally sector to urbanización to reparto to barriada to residencial, among others.

The following sectors are in Maizales barrio:

La Pitina, Loma del Viento, Parcelas La Fe, Parcelas Maizales, Rancho Grande, Sector Capiro, Sector Cecilia, Sector Colonia La Fe, Sector El Cabro, Sector Los Ramírez, Sector Ponderosa, Sector Rincón, and Urbanización Vista Verde.

== See also ==
- List of communities in Puerto Rico
- List of barrios and sectors of Naguabo, Puerto Rico
