= Río Espíritu Santo =

River of Puerto Rico

Espíritu Santo River
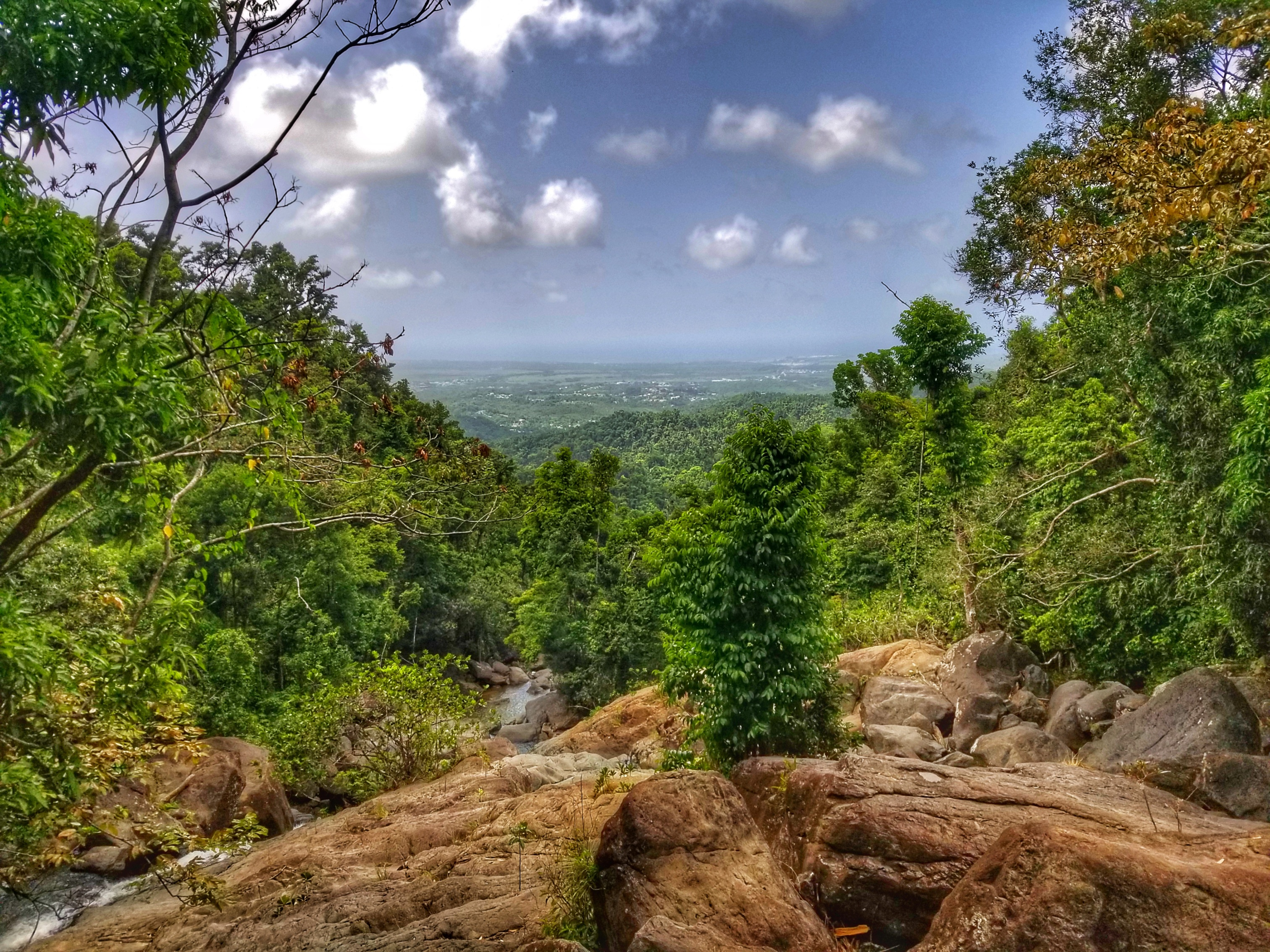
- Espíritu Santo River from PR-186 in El Yunque
- Native name: Río Espíritu Santo (Spanish)

Location
- Commonwealth: Puerto Rico
- Municipality: Río Grande

Physical characteristics
- Source
  - location: Jiménez near El Yunque
  - coordinates: 18.4113369°N 65.8034969°W
- Mouth
  - location: Atlantic Ocean between barrios Herreras and Zarzal
  - elevation: 0 ft (0 m)

The Espíritu Santo River (Spanish: Río Espíritu Santo) is a river of Río Grande, Puerto Rico. The river has its source at one of the highest elevations within the El Yunque rainforest.

== Geography ==
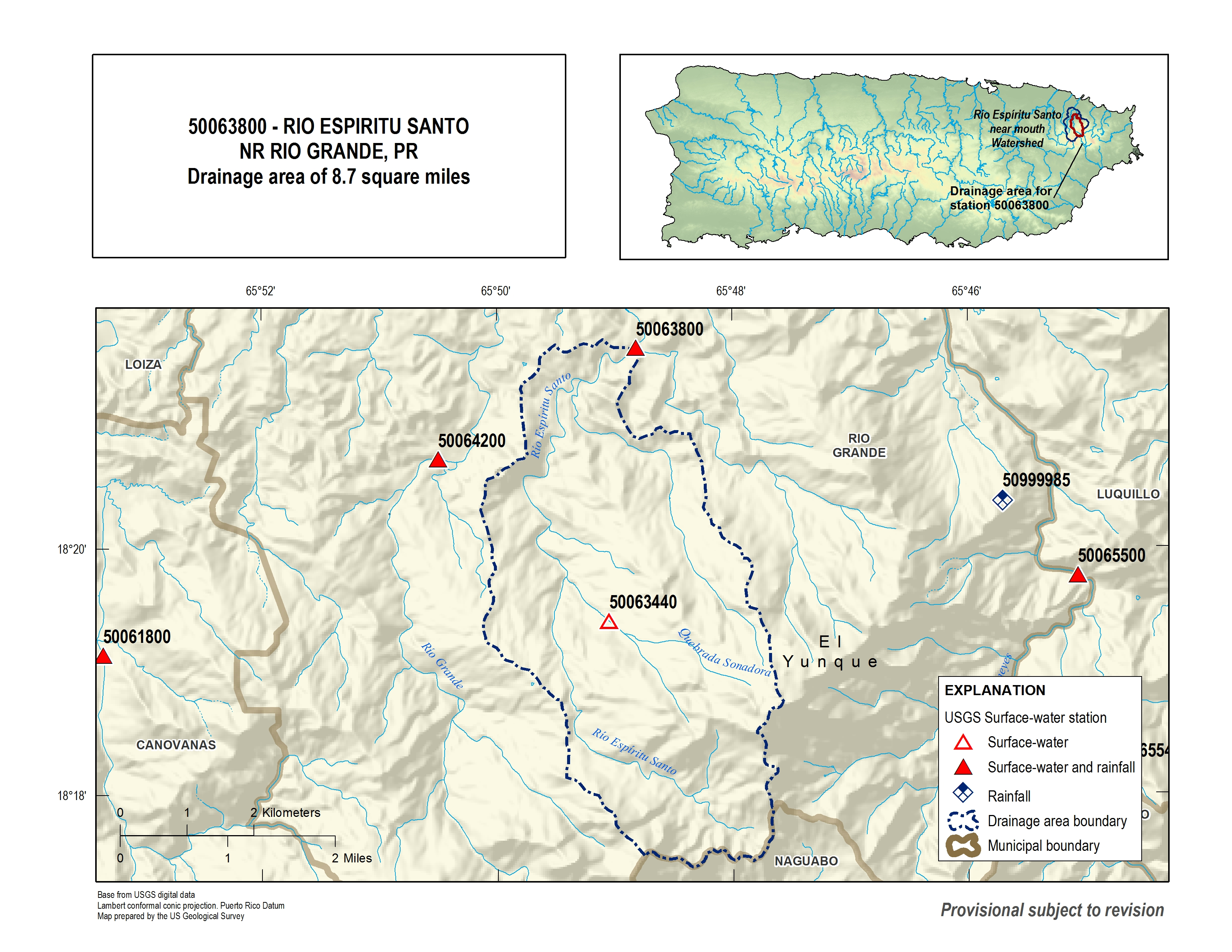
Lambert conformal conic projection map showing area of Río Espíritu Santo

The Espíritu Santo River, named after the devotion to the Holy Spirit (Espíritu Santo), is one of the main defining hydrological features of the northeastern coastal plains of Puerto Rico. It is also the primary stream that flows through the municipality of Río Grande. The river has its source within the boundaries of barrio Jiménez, very close to the peaks of El Yunque and Mount Britton, from where it flows northward into the Atlantic Ocean.

Some of its tributaries include Quebrada Sonadora, Quebrada Grande, Quebrada Jiménez, Quebrada Juan González, and the Grande River or Río Grande (the namesake of the municipality).

== Ecology ==
Along with those found in the Northeast Ecological Corridor, the Espíritu Santo River basin is one of the most exemplary riparian ecosystems of northeastern Puerto Rico. It is home to at least 65 species of birds, 60 species of fish and 14 species of crustaceans. Its estuary is also the spawning ground of fish of crustacean species which are critical to the local fishing communities.

=== Environmental protection ===
Much of the headwaters and higher elevations along the Espíritu Santo River are protected as part of El Yunque National Forest. These portions of the river are scenic with pools, waterfalls and rapids.

Operated by the Puerto Rico Department of Natural and Environmental Resources (DNER), the Espíritu Santo River Nature Reserve (Reserva Natural Río Espíritu Santo) further extends throughout the subtropical marshy and forested coastal plains of Río Grande along the Espíritu Santo River and its delta ecosystem. The nature reserve also protects the marine environments beyond the river mouth, which are the home of coral reefs, seagrass meadows, and the habitat to endangered aquatic species such as West Indian manatees and leatherback sea turtles.

Despite its protected portions, the ecosystems along the river are often threatened by human development as the coastal areas of its basin are site to numerous resorts and tourist developments.

== Recreation ==
Many of the waterfall plunge pools (charcas) along the river are popular for swimming. La Paseadora del Río Espíritu Santo is a famous pontoon boat offering daily tours through the river and its nature reserve. The river remains one of the few navigable streams of its type in Puerto Rico.

== See also ==
- List of rivers in Puerto Rico
