= Húcares =

Barrio of Naguabo, Puerto Rico

- Barrio
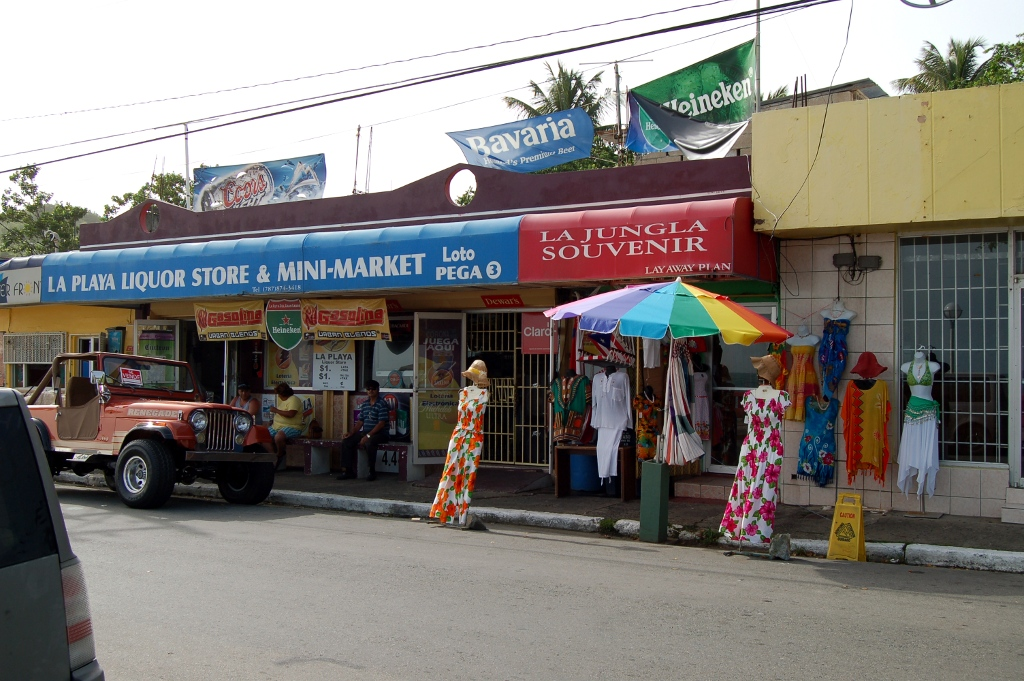
- Shops in Húcares

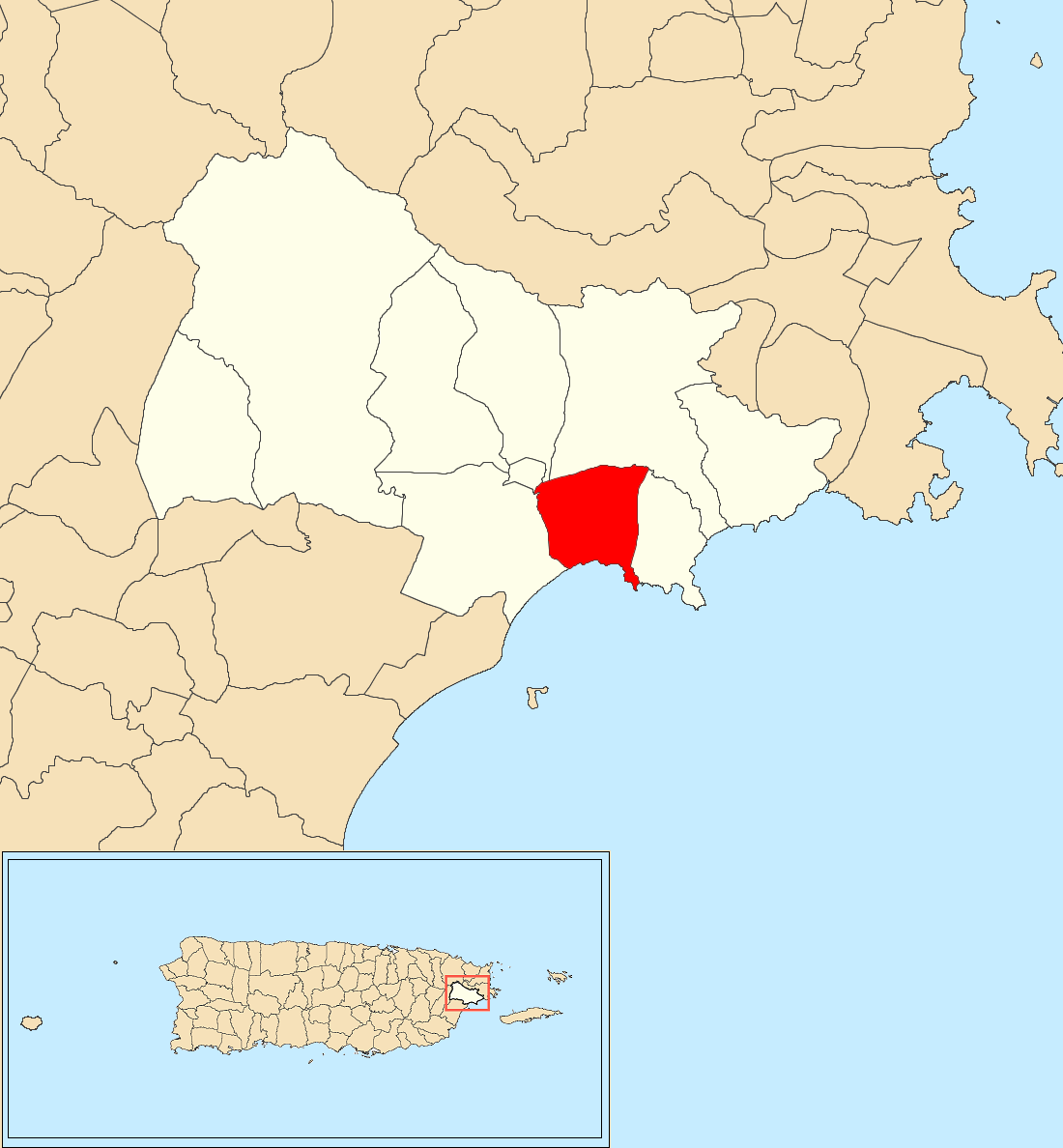
- Location of Húcares within the municipality of Naguabo shown in red

- Location of Puerto Rico
- Coordinates: 18°11′49″N 65°43′07″W
- Commonwealth: Puerto Rico
- Municipality: Naguabo

Area
  - Total: 3.14 sq mi (8.1 km^{2})
  - Land: 2.45 sq mi (6.3 km^{2})
  - Water: 0.69 sq mi (1.8 km^{2})
- Elevation: 171 ft (52 m)

Population (2010)
  - Total: 2,918
  - Density: 1,191/sq mi (460/km^{2})
- Source: 2010 Census
- Time zone: UTC−4 (AST)
- ZIP Codes: 00736
- Area code: 787/939

Húcares is a barrio in the municipality of Naguabo, Puerto Rico. Its population in 2010 was 2,918.

== History ==
Húcares was in Spain's gazetteers until Puerto Rico was ceded by Spain in the aftermath of the Spanish–American War under the terms of the Treaty of Paris of 1898 and became an unincorporated territory of the United States. In 1899, the United States Department of War conducted a census of Puerto Rico finding that the population of Húcares barrio was 826.

Historical population
Census	Pop.	Note	%±
1900	826		—
1910	783		−5.2%
1920	906		15.7%
1930	1,233		36.1%
1940	1,132		−8.2%
1950	1,694		49.6%
1960	1,743		2.9%
1970	0		−100.0%
1980	1,418		—
1990	1,435		1.2%
2000	2,118		47.6%
2010	2,918		37.8%
U.S. Decennial Census; 1899 (shown as 1900) 1910-1930; 1930-1950 1980-2000 2010

== Features ==
Playa Húcares in Húcares is not a beach per se but is a tourist attraction because of its boardwalk, fishing activities and seafood restaurants.

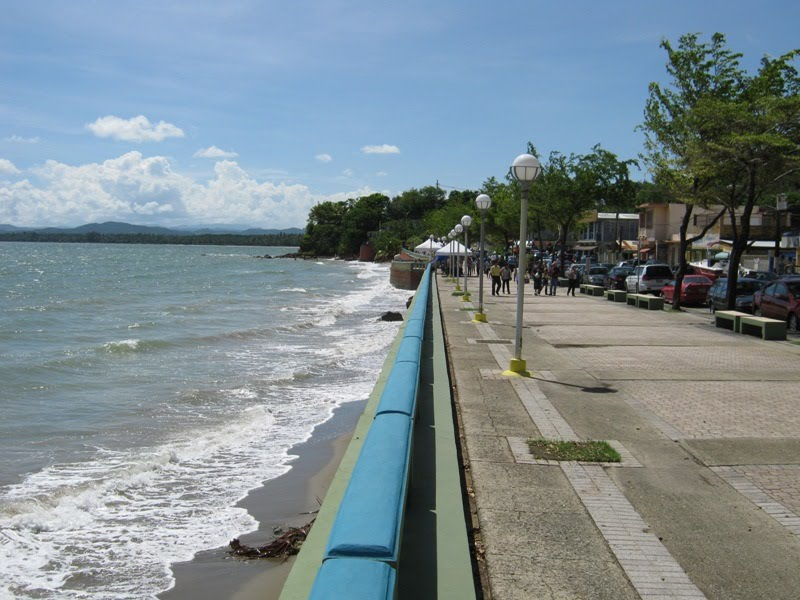
Boardwalk in Húcares

== Sectors ==
Barrios (which are, in contemporary times, roughly comparable to minor civil divisions) in turn are further subdivided into smaller local populated place areas/units called sectores (sectors in English). The types of sectores may vary, from normally sector to urbanización to reparto to barriada to residencial, among others.

The following sectors are in Húcares barrio:

Calle Punta Lima, Estancias de Húcares, Hacienda El Triunfo, Las Mercedes (Calle de la Playa), Mansiones de Playa Húcares, Parcelas Invasión, Parcelas Nuevas, Parcelas Playa, Residencial Húcares I y II, Sector Calle del Pueblo, Sector Cambímbora, Sector El Faro, Sector Fanduca, Sector La Changa, Sector La Ola, Urbanización Cala de Húcares, Urbanización Jardín del Este, Urbanización Lomas de Santo Tomás, Urbanización Los Valles, Urbanización Mar Caribe, and Urbanización Santo Tomás.

== See also ==
- List of communities in Puerto Rico
- List of barrios and sectors of Naguabo, Puerto Rico
