= 1872 in music =

This article is about music-related events in 1872.

== Events ==
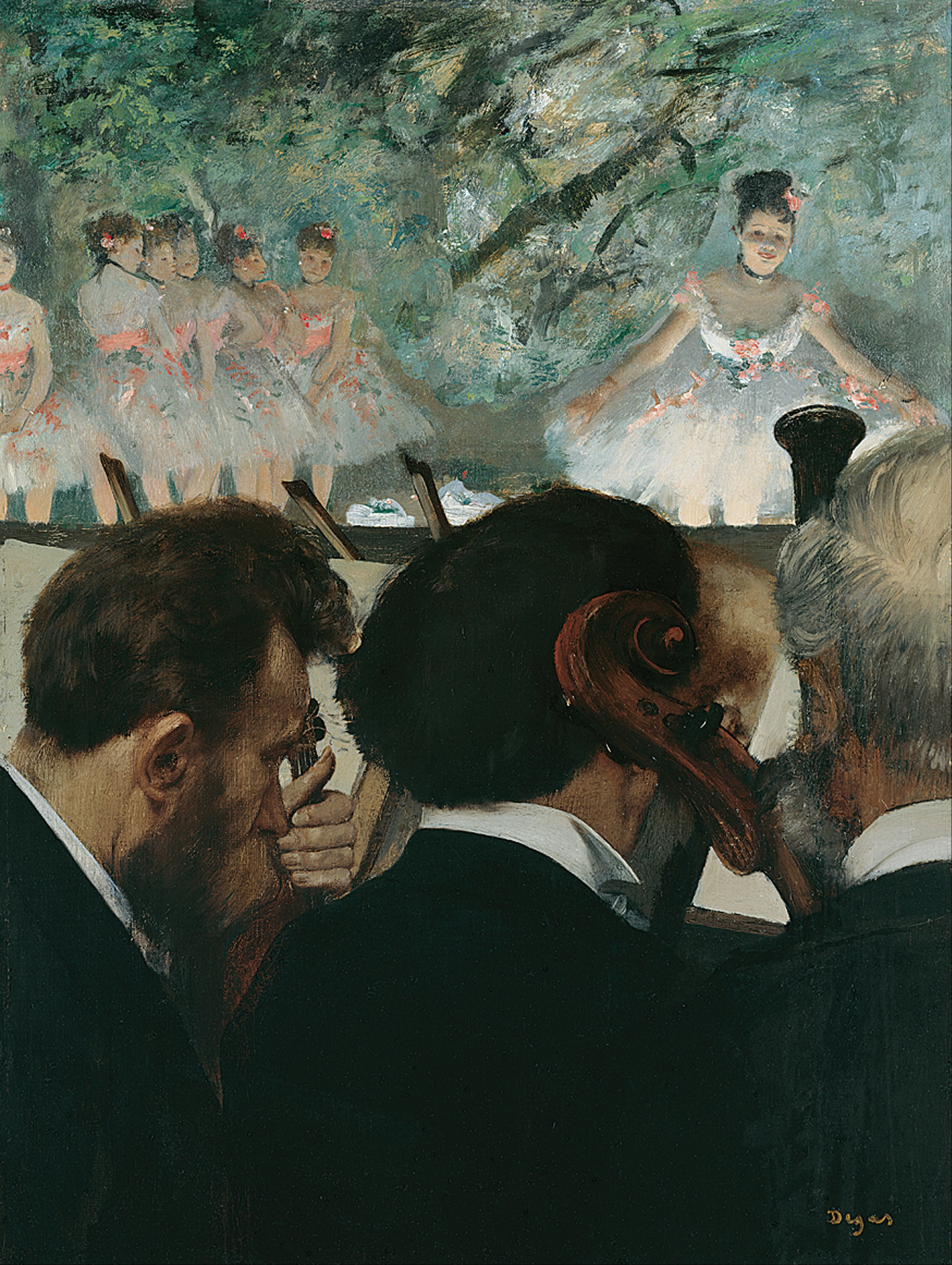
At the Ballet, 1872, by Edgar Degas

- May 29 – Franz Liszt's oratorio 'Christus (Liszt)' (composed 1862-"66) premiered in the Protestant church at Weimar.
- June 5 – closure of the Teatro Re following its final performance, Rossini's The Barber of Seville
- June 24 – Karl Müller-Hartung founds an "Orchesterschule" ("Orchestra School") at Weimar.
  - – first performance in England of Bach's Brandenburg Concerto No 3 at a Philharmonic Society concert.
- Friedrich Nietzsche takes up musical composition again after a long break.
- Tomás Bretón and Ruperto Chapí receive the first prize of the Madrid Conservatory.
- Anton Rubinstein begins a tour of the United States at the behest of Steinway and Sons.
- Richard Wagner completes the full draft of Götterdämmerung.

== Published popular music ==
- "The Gospel Train" by Fisk Jubilee Singers
- "Moonlight on the Potomac" by John Philip Sousa
- "Waste Not, Want Not [You Never Miss the Water Till the Well Runs Dry]" by Harry Linn & Rollin Howard
- "Only a Dream" by George Cooper & William Vincent Wallace
- "Under the silvery stars," words by Arthur W. French, music by William A. Huntley

== Classical music ==
- Georges Bizet – L'Arlésienne Suite No. 1 from the incidental music to Alphonse Daudet's play of the same name
- Anton Bruckner – Symphony No. 2
- Joseph Callaerts – Grande fantaisie de concert, Op.5
- Antonín Dvořák – Piano Quintet No. 1
- César Franck – Veni creator
- Charles Gounod - Funeral March of a Marionette
- Franz Paul Lachner -Octet for winds, Op. 156
- Franz Liszt - Sunt lacrymae rerum
- Modest Mussorgsky – The Nursery
- Camille Saint-Saëns
  - Cello Concerto No. 1
  - Cello Sonata No. 1
- Johan Svendsen – Carnival in Paris, Op.9
- Pyotr Ilyich Tchaikovsky - Symphony No. 2
- Charles-Marie Widor – Organ Symphony No.4, Op.13 No.4
- August Winding - Three Fantasy Pieces, for clarinet or violin and piano, Op. 19

== Opera ==
- Georges Bizet – Djamileh
- Gialdino Gialdini – La secchia rapita premiered at the Teatro Goldoni, Florence
- Alexandre Charles Lecocq – Les cent vierges
- Miguel Marqués – Justos por pecadores
- Karel Miry
  - De dichter en zijn droombeeld (opera in 4 acts, libretto by Hendrik Conscience, premiered on December 2 in Brussels)
  - De twee zusters (opera in 1 act, libretto by P. Geiregat, premiered in Brussels)
- Modest Mussorgsky – Boris Gudonov, Revised Version
- Jacques Offenbach – Fantasio
- Camille Saint-Saëns – La princesse jaune, Op. 30

== Musical theater ==
- La fille de Madame Angot, Brussels production
- La Vie parisienne, London production

== Publications ==
- Richard Wagner – Über die Benennung "Musikdrama"

== Births ==
- January 1 – Hermine Finck, opera singer (d. 1932)
- January 4 – Ottilie Sutro, piano duettist (d. 1970)
- January 6 – Alexander Scriabin, Russian composer (d. 1915)
- January 11 – Paul Graener, conductor and composer (d. 1944)
- January 16 – Henri Büsser, conductor and composer (d. 1973)
- January 23 – Adelina de Lara, pianist and composer (d. 1961)
- March 6 – Ben Harney, ragtime pianist and songwriter (d. 1938)
- March 7 – Vasily Andreyevich Zolotaryov, Russian composer
- March 8 – Paul Juon, Russian-Swiss violinist and composer (d. 1940)
- March 10 – Felix Borowski, composer and music teacher (d. 1956)
- March 19 – Sergei Diaghilev, choreographer (d. 1929)
- March 20 – Bernhard Sekles, composer and music teacher (d. 1934)
- March 30 – Sergey Nikiforovich Vasilenko, composer (d. 1956)
- April 1 – Tadeusz Joteyko, composer
- April 29 – Eyvind Alnæs, composer (d. 1932)
- May 1 – Hugo Alfvén, composer (d. 1960)
- June 22 – Clara Mathilda Faisst, pianist (died 1948)
- July 7 – Juan Lamote de Grignon pianist, conductor and composer (d. 1949)
- July 8 – Harry Von Tilzer, songwriter (d. 1946)
- July 18 – Julius Fučík, composer (d. 1916)
- July 20 – Déodat de Séverac, composer (d. 1921)
- August 10 – Bill Johnson, dixieland jazz double-bassist (d. 1972)
- August 15
  - Harold Fraser-Simson, composer and songwriter (d. 1944)
  - Rubin Goldmark, composer (d. 1936)
- September 9 – Josef Stránský, conductor (died 1936)
- October 12 – Ralph Vaughan Williams, composer (d. 1958)
- November 29 – Anna von Mildenburg, Austrian soprano (d. 1947)
- December 17 – Walter Loving, military bandleader (k. 1945)
- December 20 – Lorenzo Perosi, Italian composer (d. 1956)

== Deaths ==
- January 20 – Raffaele Sacco, lyricist (b. 1787)
- February 16 – Henry Fothergill Chorley, music critic (b. 1808)
- March 22 – Karolina Bock, singer, dancer and actress (b. 1792)
- March 23? - Hugo Ulrich, composer, teacher and arranger (b. 1827) (poss. born May 23)
- April 3 – Henriette Widerberg, operatic soprano (b. 1796)
- April 12 – Nikolaos Mantzaros, composer (b. 1795)
- May 5 – Johann Kulik, luthier (b. 1800)
- May 9 – Viktorin Hallmayer, conductor and composer (b. 1831)
- May 15 – Thomas Hastings, composer of hymns (b. 1784)
- July 26 – Michele Carafa, opera composer (b. 1787)
- August 4 – Wilhelm Friedrich Wieprecht, conductor and composer (b. 1802)
- August 11 – Lowell Mason, organist and composer (b. 1792)
- September 16 – Gall Morel, choirmaster (b. 1803)
- November 21
  - Myllarguten, folk musician (b. 1801)
  - Emile Steinkühler, composer (born 1824)
- November 29 – Giovanni Tadolini, composer
