= Saco =

Saco may refer to:

== Geography ==
=== Brazil ===
- Saco River (Maranhão), Maranhão state
- Saco River (Paracauari), Pará state

=== Mozambique ===
- Saco Bay (Mozambique)

=== United States ===
- Saco, Alabama, an unincorporated community
- Saco, Georgia, an unincorporated community
- Saco, Maine, a city
  - Saco Bay (Maine)
  - Saco River, Maine and New Hampshire
- Saco, Minnesota, an unincorporated community
- Saco, Missouri, an unincorporated community
- Saco, Montana, a town
- Saco, Ceiba, Puerto Rico, a barrio in the municipality of Ceiba

== People ==
- José Antonio Saco (1797–1879), Cuban-born deputy to the Spanish Cortes, writer, social critic, publicist, essayist, anthropologist and historian
- Saco Rienk de Boer (1883–1974), Dutch-born American landscape architect
- Saco Reinalda (died 1167), potestaat of Friesland

== Other uses ==
- USS Saco, three US Navy vessels

== See also ==
- SACO (disambiguation)
- Saco River (disambiguation)
- Sacco (disambiguation)
