= Sacko =

Sacko is a surname, and may refer to:

- Aboubakary Sacko (born 2003), French footballer
- Aminata Sacko (born 1984), Malian footballer
- Bobo Sacko (born 1988), French Muay Thai fighter
- Bouba Sacko (died 2011), Malian guitarist
- Derek Mazou-Sacko (born 2004), French footballer
- Falaye Sacko (born 1995), Malian footballer
- Fanta Sacko, Malian musician
- Fatima Sacko (born 1998), Guinean basketball player
- Fatimatou Sacko (born 1985), French basketball player
- George MacDonald Sacko (1936–2011), Liberian footballer
- Hadi Sacko (born 1994), Malian footballer
- Ibrahim Sacko (born 1993), French footballer
- Ihsan Sacko (born 1997), French footballer
- Souleymane Dela Sacko (born 1977), Nigerien footballer
- Soumana Sacko (1950–2025), Malian politician and economist, Prime Minister 1991–1992

== See also ==
- Madiga Sacko, commune in western Mali
- Sacco (disambiguation), a commune in Italy and an Italian surname
- The Sacko, a booby prize for the characters on the American television show The League
