= Daguao =

Daguao may refer to:

== Places ==
- Daguao, Ceiba, Puerto Rico, a barrio
- Daguao, Naguabo, Puerto Rico, a barrio
