= List of barrios and sectors of Ceiba, Puerto Rico =

Like all municipalities of Puerto Rico, Ceiba is subdivided into administrative units called barrios, which are, in contemporary times, roughly comparable to minor civil divisions The barrios and subbarrios, in turn, are further subdivided into smaller local populated place areas/units called sectores (sectors in English). The types of sectores may vary, from normally sector to urbanización to reparto to barriada to residencial, among others. Some sectors appear in two barrios.

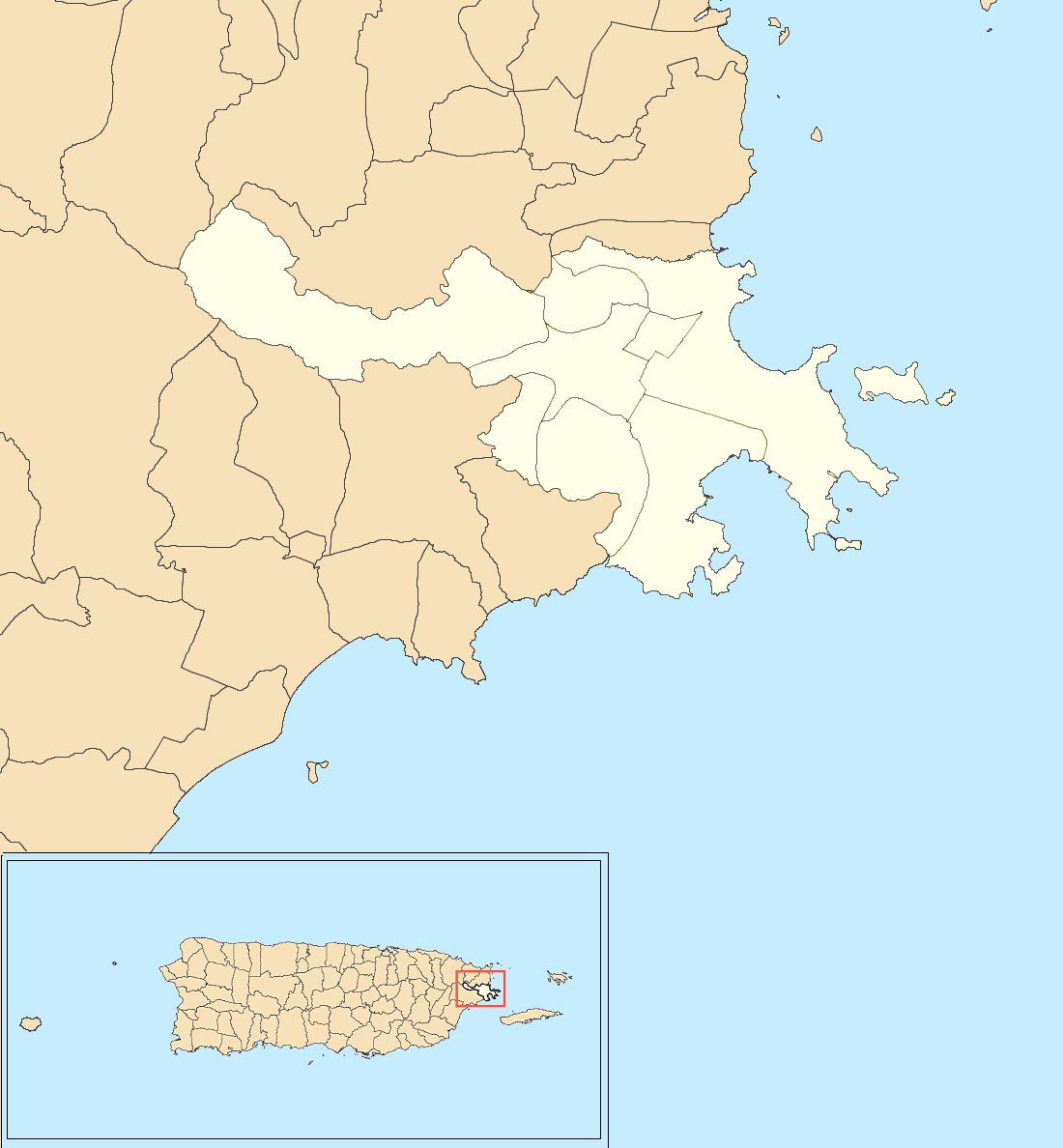
Ceiba map with barrio subdivisions

== List of sectors by barrio ==
=== Ceiba barrio-pueblo ===
- Apartamentos Portal de Ceiba
- Condominio Costa Esmeralda
- Condominio Paseo Esmeralda
- Égida Francisco Colón Gordiani
- Residencia Solares Ávila
- Residencial Jardines de Ceiba
- Sector Colonia Santa María
- Urbanización Celina
- Urbanización Costa Brava
- Urbanización Jardines Ávila
- Urbanización Jardines de Ceiba I y II
- Urbanización Paseo de la Costa
- Urbanización Puerta del Sol
- Urbanización Ramos Antonini
- Urbanización Rossy Valley
- Urbanización Santa María
- Urbanización Villa Flores

=== Chupacallos ===
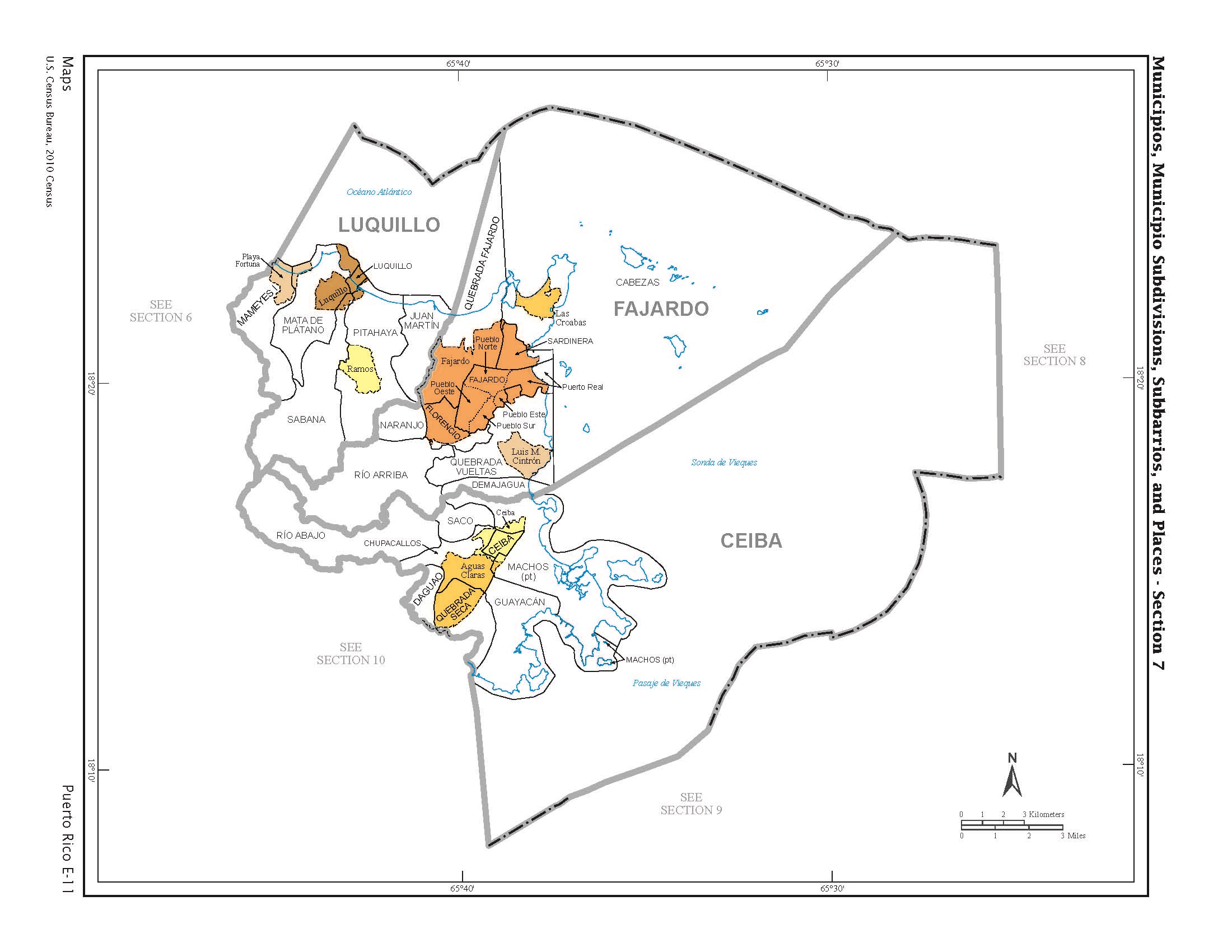
US 2010 Census map of Subdivisions, and Places of Ceiba, Fajardo, and Luquillo in Puerto Rico

- Parcelas Aguas Claras
- Sector El Corcho
- Sector El Panal
- Sector Las Quintas
- Sector Silén
- Urbanización Mansiones Vista de Mar

=== Daguao ===
- Sector Los Millones

=== Guayacán Sectors ===
There are no sectors in Guayacán barrio.

=== Machos ===
- Condominio Brisas Court
- Condominio Castillos del Mar
- Edificio Félix Ríos López
- Edificio Mundo Plaza
- Extensión Villas del Pilar
- Parcelas Machos
- Residencial La Seyba
- Sector Cielito
- Sector Mansiones de Brisas
- Sector Polo Norte
- Sector Punta Figueras
- Urbanización Brisas de Ceiba
- Urbanización Paseo de Ceiba
- Urbanización River Valley
- Urbanización Valle de Ceiba
- Urbanización Vegas de Ceiba
- Urbanización The Village at the Hill
- Urbanización Villas del Pilar

=== Quebrada Seca ===
- Barrio Daguao Abajo
- Barrio Daguao Arriba
- Edificio Bundy (Bundy Apartment)
- Parcelas Nuevas de Quebrada Seca
- Sector El Sol (Calle El Sol)
- Sector Estancia Prado Hermoso,
- Sector La Luna (Calle Luna)
- Urbanización Roosevelt Gardens

=== Río Abajo ===
- Camino Charco Frío
- Sector La Paloma
- Sector Rincón
- Sector Sonadora

=== Saco ===
- Parcelas Calderona
- Sector Aguacate
- Sector El Mangó
- Sector Las Quintas

== See also ==
- List of communities in Puerto Rico
