= Daguao River =

River of Puerto Rico

Coordinates: 18.2069029°N 65.6643282°W

- Native name: Río Daguao (Spanish)

Location
- Commonwealth: Puerto Rico
- Municipality: Ceiba

Physical characteristics
- Source
  - elevation: 0 ft.

The Daguao River (Spanish: Río Daguao) is a river of Puerto Rico. Its source is in Chupacallos barrio in Ceiba and Naguabo, Puerto Rico.

== See also ==
- List of rivers of Puerto Rico
