= Sacco =

Sacco is a surname which may refer to:

- Albert Sacco (born 1949), American chemical engineer and astronaut
- Andreina Sacco (1904–1988), Italian multi-sport track-and-field athlete
- Angelo Sacco (died 1529), Italian Roman Catholic prelate who served as Bishop of Alife
- Antonio Sacco (1708–1788), Italian actor
- Bruno Sacco (born 1933), Italian car designer
- David Sacco (born 1971), American former ice hockey player
- Desmond Sacco, South African businessman
- Federico Sacco (1864–1948), Italian geologist, palaeontologist and mycologist
- Filippo Sacco (1905–1976), later known as John Roselli
- François Marie Sacco (1643–1721), Italian Roman Catholic prelate who served as Bishop of Brugnato and Bishop of Ajaccio
- George Sacco (1936–2025), American lawyer and politician
- Gioia Sacco (born 1988), Italian rower
- Giovanni Sacco (1943–2020), Italian footballer
- Giuseppe Sacco (born 1938), Italian academic specialising in international relations
- Joe Sacco (born 1960), Maltese-American artist and journalist
- Joe Sacco (ice hockey) (born 1969), American former ice hockey player
- Johanna Sacco (1754–1802), Austrian ballet dancer and stage actor
- José da Costa Sacco (1930–2023), Brazilian botanist
- Joshua Sacco (born 1978), Zimbabwean politician and former musician
- Lugee Sacco (1943–2025), stage name Lou Christie, American pop and soft rock singer-songwriter
- Luigi Sacco (1883–1970), Italian general and cryptologist
- Michael Sacco (born 1937), American labor leader
- Nicholas Sacco (born 1946), American politician
- Nicola Sacco (1891–1927), Italian-American anarchist; co-defendant in the Sacco and Vanzetti case
- Peter Sacco (1928–2000), American composer and singer
- Raffaele Sacco (1787–1872), Italian optician and lyricist
- Ralph L. Sacco (1957–2023), American neurologist
- Renzo Sacco (1944–2023), Italian politician
- Rodolfo Sacco (1923–2022), Italian legal scholar
- Ubaldo Néstor Sacco (1955–1997), Argentine boxer

== See also ==
- Pietro De Franchi Sacco (1545–1611), Doge of the Republic of Genoa
- Sacko, a Malian surname
