= Quebrada Seca, Ceiba, Puerto Rico =

Barrio of Puerto Rico

Quebrada Seca
- Barrio
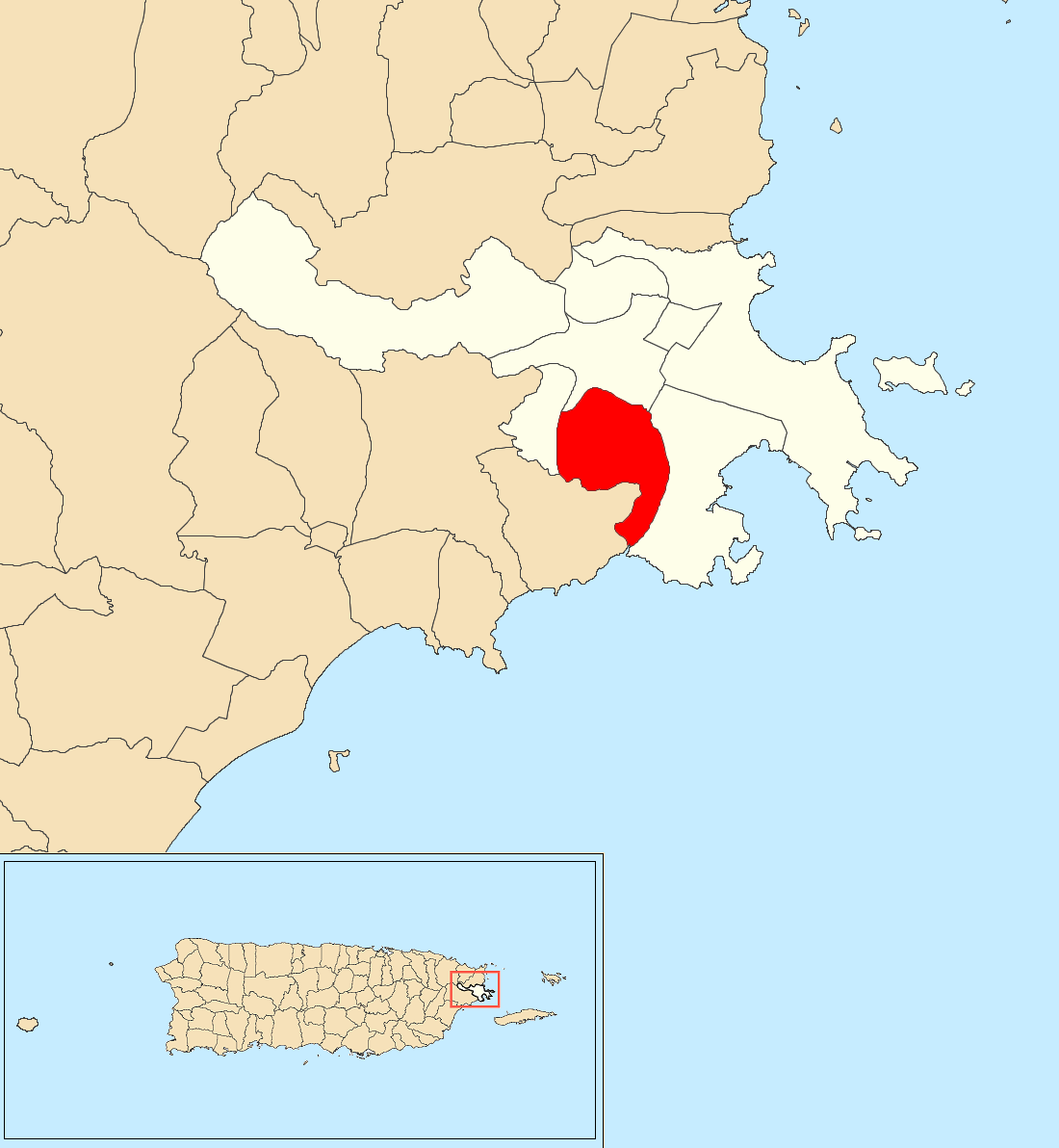
- Location of Quebrada Seca within the municipality of Ceiba shown in red

- Location of Puerto Rico
- Coordinates: 18°14′01″N 65°39′49″W
- Commonwealth: Puerto Rico
- Municipality: Ceiba

Area
  - Total: 2.78 sq mi (7.2 km^{2})
  - Land: 2.77 sq mi (7.2 km^{2})
  - Water: 0.01 sq mi (0.026 km^{2})
- Elevation: 46 ft (14 m)

Population (2010)
  - Total: 1,415
  - Density: 512.7/sq mi (198.0/km^{2})
- Source: 2010 Census
- Time zone: UTC−4 (AST)

Quebrada Seca is a barrio in the municipality of Ceiba, Puerto Rico. Its population in 2010 was 1,415.

== History ==
Quebrada Seca was in Spain's gazetteers until Puerto Rico was ceded by Spain in the aftermath of the Spanish–American War under the terms of the Treaty of Paris of 1898 and became an unincorporated territory of the United States. In 1899, the United States Department of War conducted a census of Puerto Rico finding that the combined population of Quebrada Seca and Guayacán barrios (counted with Fajardo) was 820.

Historical population
Census	Pop.	Note	%±
1910	784		—
1920	889		13.4%
1930	1,309		47.2%
1940	949		−27.5%
1950	2,351		147.7%
1960	644		−72.6%
1970	823		27.8%
1980	1,709		107.7%
1990	1,076		−37.0%
2000	1,568		45.7%
2010	1,415		−9.8%
U.S. Decennial Census; 1900 (N/A) 1910-1930; 1930-1950 1980-2000 2010

== Sectors ==
Barrios (which are, in contemporary times, roughly comparable to minor civil divisions) in turn are further subdivided into smaller local populated place areas/units called sectores (sectors in English). The types of sectores may vary, from normally sector to urbanización to reparto to barriada to residencial, among others.

The following sectors are in Quebrada Seca barrio:

Barrio Daguao Abajo, Barrio Daguao Arriba, Edificio Bundy (Bundy Apartment), Parcelas Nuevas de Quebrada Seca, Sector El Sol (Calle El Sol), Sector Estancia Prado Hermoso, Sector La Luna (Calle Luna), and Urbanización Roosevelt Gardens.

== See also ==
- List of communities in Puerto Rico
- List of barrios and sectors of Ceiba, Puerto Rico
