= USS Saco =

Three ships in the United States Navy have been named USS Saco for the Saco River and for Saco, Maine.

- The first USS Saco (1863) was a gunboat launched in 1863, served in the American Civil War and sold in 1883.
- The second USS Saco (YT-31) was a steam tugboat, built in 1912. She was acquired by the Navy in 1918 and served as a yard tug until 1927.
- The third USS Saco (YTB-796) was a yard tug launched into service in 1968 and struck from the Naval Vessel Register in 2005, after serving in Guam.
