= Ceiba barrio-pueblo =

Historical and administrative center (seat) of Ceiba, Puerto Rico

Ceiba barrio-pueblo Pueblo de Ceiba
- Municipality Seat
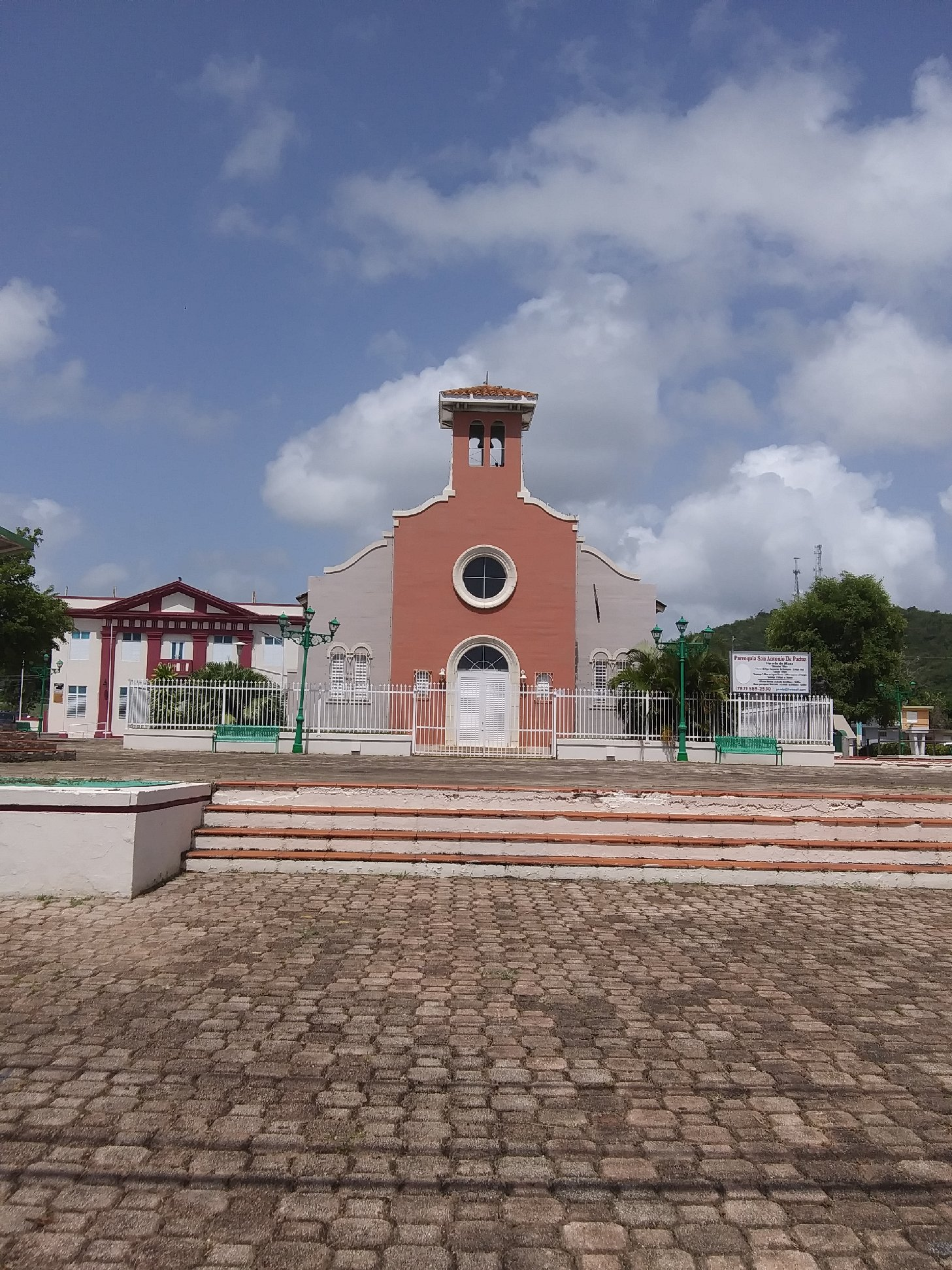
- Plaza and church in Ceiba barrio-pueblo

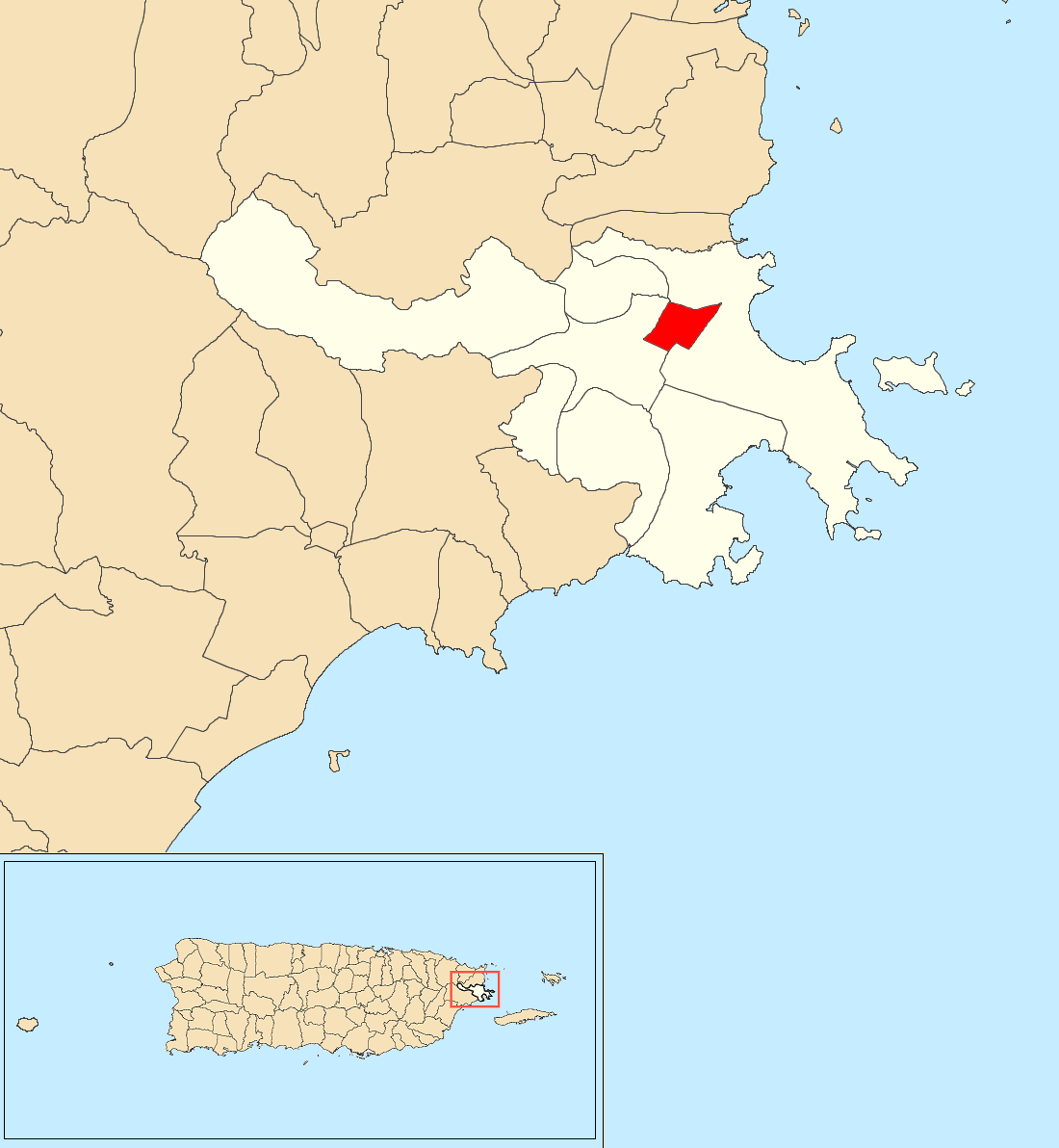
- Location of Ceiba barrio-pueblo within the municipality of Ceiba shown in red

- Location of Puerto Rico
- Coordinates: 18°15′49″N 65°38′53″W
- Commonwealth: Puerto Rico
- Municipality: Ceiba

Area
  - Total: 0.55 sq mi (1.4 km^{2})
  - Land: 0.55 sq mi (1.4 km^{2})
  - Water: 0 sq mi (0 km^{2})
- Elevation: 75 ft (23 m)

Population (2010)
  - Total: 3,677
  - Density: 6,685.5/sq mi (2,581.3/km^{2})
- Source: 2010 Census
- Time zone: UTC−4 (AST)

Ceiba barrio-pueblo is a barrio and the administrative center (seat) of Ceiba, a municipality of Puerto Rico. Its population in 2010 was 3,677. As was customary in Spain, in Puerto Rico, the municipality has a barrio called pueblo which contains a central plaza, the municipal buildings (city hall), and a Catholic church. Fiestas patronales (patron saint festivals) are held in the central plaza every year.

== The central plaza and its church ==
The central plaza, or square, is a place for official and unofficial recreational events and a place where people can gather and socialize from dusk to dawn. The Laws of the Indies, Spanish law, which regulated life in Puerto Rico in the early 19th century, stated the plaza's purpose was for "the parties" (celebrations, festivities) (Spanish: a propósito para las fiestas), and that the square should be proportionally large enough for the number of neighbors (Spanish: grandeza proporcionada al número de vecinos). These Spanish regulations also stated that the streets nearby should be comfortable portals for passersby, protecting them from the elements: sun and rain.

Located across from the central plaza in Ceiba barrio-pueblo is the Parroquia San Antonio de Padua, a Roman Catholic church which was inaugurated in 1840.

== History ==
Ceiba barrio-pueblo was in Spain's gazetteers until Puerto Rico was ceded by Spain in the aftermath of the Spanish–American War under the terms of the Treaty of Paris of 1898 and became an unincorporated territory of the United States. In 1899, the United States Department of War conducted a census of Puerto Rico finding that the population of Ceiba barrio-pueblo (called Zona Urbana or Urban Zone) was 753.

Historical population
Census	Pop.	Note	%±
1900	753		—
1910	920		22.2%
1920	847		−7.9%
1930	1,204		42.1%
1940	1,442		19.8%
1950	1,665		15.5%
1960	1,644		−1.3%
1970	0		−100.0%
1980	3,008		—
1990	3,650		21.3%
2000	3,816		4.5%
2010	3,677		−3.6%
U.S. Decennial Census; 1899 (shown as 1900) 1910-1930; 1930-1950 1980-2000 2010

== Sectors ==
Barrios (which are, in contemporary times, roughly comparable to minor civil divisions) in turn are further subdivided into smaller local populated place areas/units called sectores (sectors in English). The types of sectores may vary, from normally sector to urbanización to reparto to barriada to residencial, among others.

The following sectors are in Ceiba barrio-pueblo:

Apartamentos Portal de Ceiba, Condominio Costa Esmeralda, Condominio Paseo Esmeralda, Égida Francisco Colón Gordiani, Residencia Solares Ávila, Residencial Jardines de Ceiba, Sector Colonia Santa María, Urbanización Celina, Urbanización Costa Brava, Urbanización Jardines Ávila, Urbanización Jardines de Ceiba I y II, Urbanización Paseo de la Costa, Urbanización Puerta del Sol, Urbanización Ramos Antonini, Urbanización Rossy Valley, Urbanización Santa María, and Urbanización Villa Flores.

== Gallery ==
Places in Ceiba barrio-pueblo:

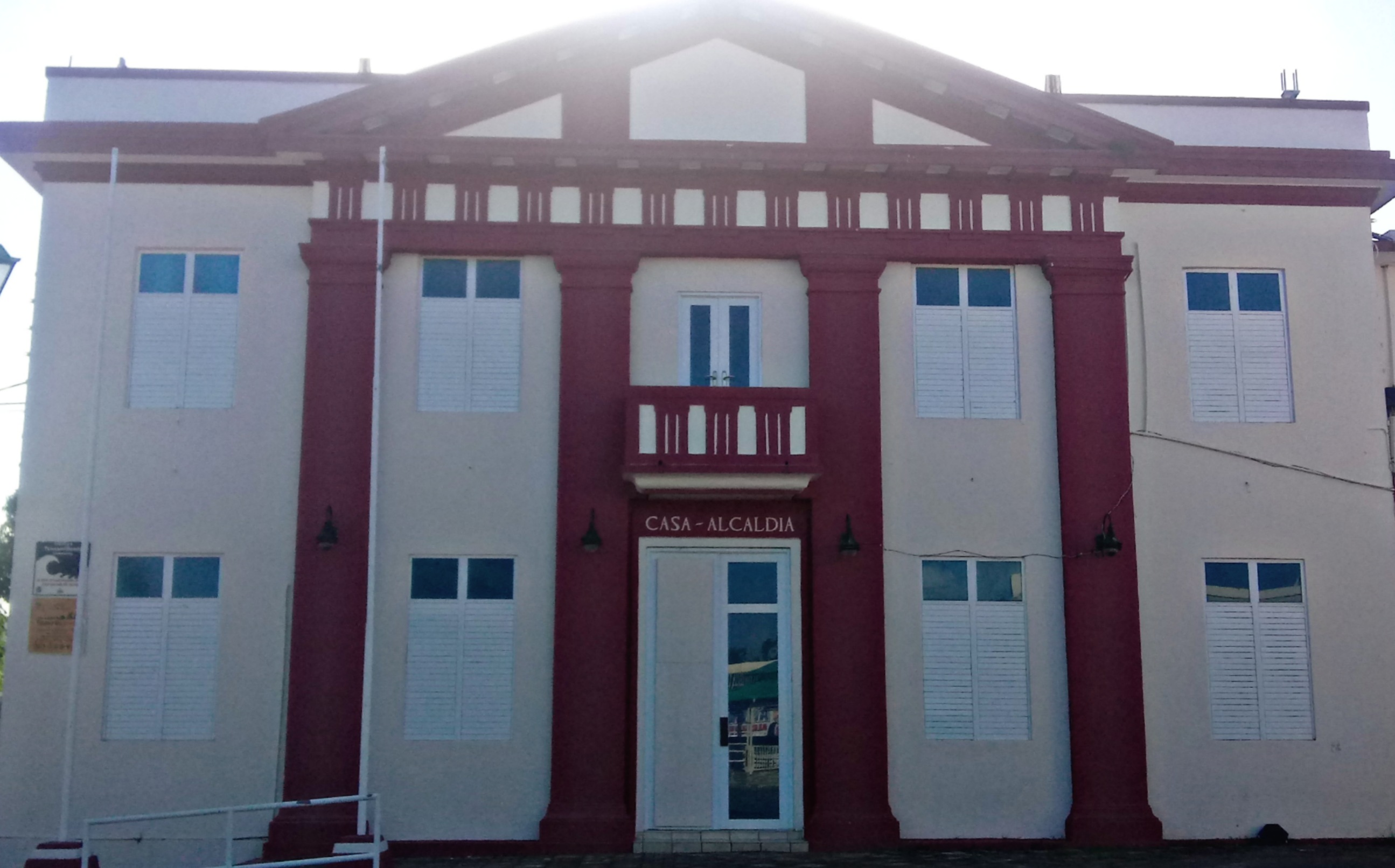
Ceiba Town Hall

== See also ==
- List of communities in Puerto Rico
- List of barrios and sectors of Ceiba, Puerto Rico
