= SACO =

SACO is an initialism that may refer to:

- Ingeniero Aeronáutico Ambrosio L.V. Taravella International Airport's ICAO code
- SACO Apartments, a UK-based vacation rental company
- Sino-American Cooperative Organization, a World War II–era treaty for cooperation between the United States and Republic of China
- South African Computer Olympiad, an annual computer programming competition for secondary school students
- Special Action Committee on Okinawa, an agreement between the United States and Japan in 1995 to develop new rules to govern U.S. military bases on Okinawa
- SACO (Colombia), or Colombian Air Service, an airline that operated from 1933 to 1940
- St Augustine Chamber Orchestra, a chamber orchestra in Trinidad and Tobago
- SACO Defense, now General Dynamics, a U.S. defense conglomerate
- Swedish Confederation of Professional Associations (SACO)
- SACO Hardware, Saudi Arabian hardware retailing and wholesaling business

== See also ==
- Saco (disambiguation)
