= Guayacán, Ceiba, Puerto Rico =

Barrio of Puerto Rico

Guayacán
- Barrio
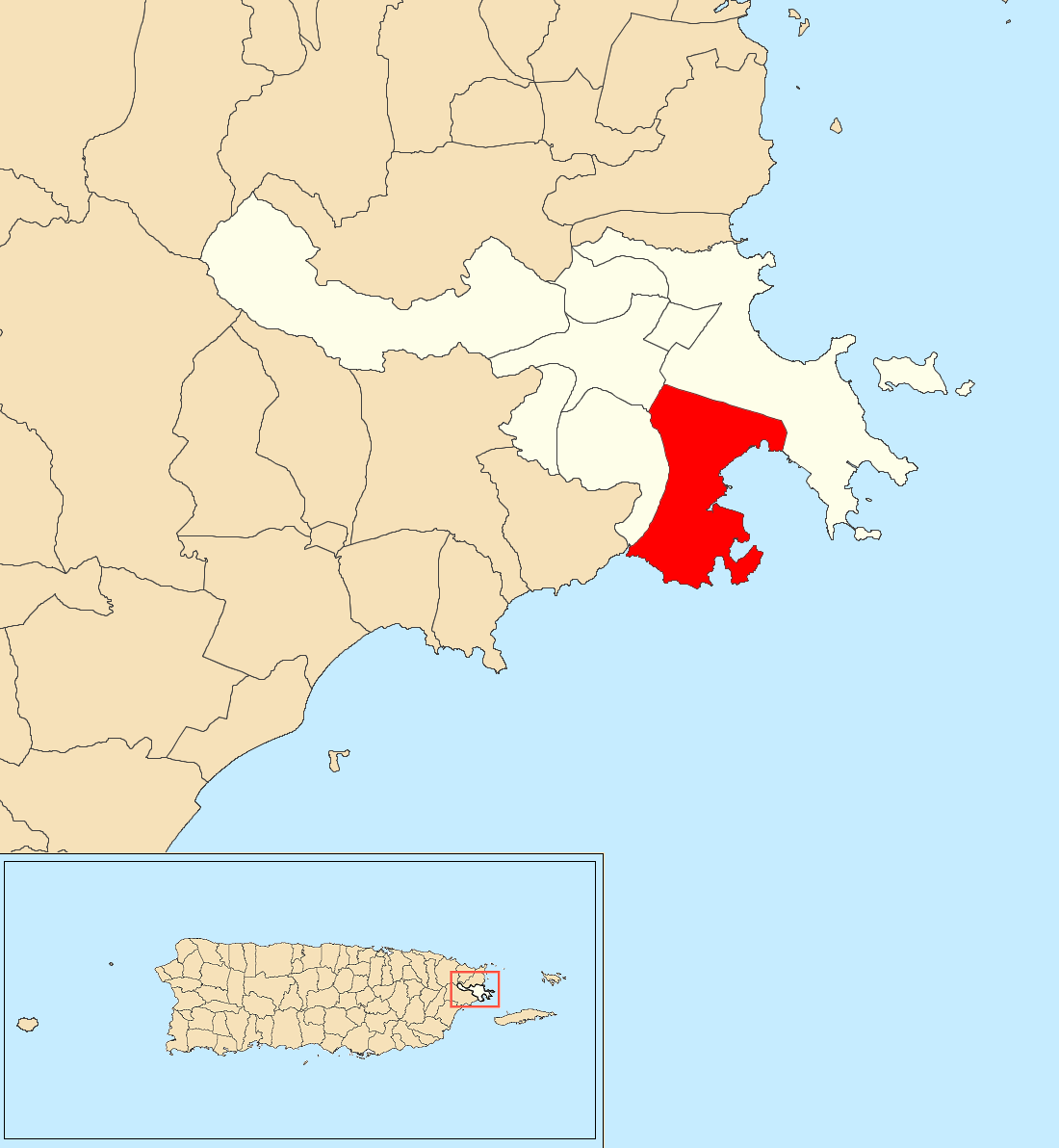
- Location of Guayacán within the municipality of Ceiba shown in red

- Location of Puerto Rico
- Coordinates: 18°13′27″N 65°38′10″W
- Commonwealth: Puerto Rico
- Municipality: Ceiba

Area
  - Total: 7.10 sq mi (18.4 km^{2})
  - Land: 4.47 sq mi (11.6 km^{2})
  - Water: 2.63 sq mi (6.8 km^{2})
- Elevation: 0 ft (0 m)

Population (2010)
  - Total: 2
- Source: 2010 Census
- Time zone: UTC−4 (AST)

Guayacán is a barrio in the municipality of Ceiba, Puerto Rico. Its population in 2010 was 2.

== History ==
Guayacán was in Spain's gazetteers until Puerto Rico was ceded by Spain in the aftermath of the Spanish–American War under the terms of the Treaty of Paris of 1898 and became an unincorporated territory of the United States. In 1899, the United States Department of War conducted a census of Puerto Rico finding that the combined population of Guayacán and Quebrada Seca barrios (counted with Fajardo) was 820.

Historical population
Census	Pop.	Note	%±
1910	431		—
1920	368		−14.6%
1930	343		−6.8%
1940	332		−3.2%
1950	749		125.6%
1960	2,615		249.1%
1970	2,333		−10.8%
1980	3,141		34.6%
1990	4,069		29.5%
2000	3,242		−20.3%
2010	2		−99.9%
U.S. Decennial Census; 1900 (N/A) 1910-1930; 1930-1950 1980-2000 2010

== See also ==
- List of communities in Puerto Rico
- List of barrios and sectors of Ceiba, Puerto Rico
