= Sacco (disambiguation) =

Sacco is a surname. It may also refer to:

- Sacco, Campania, Italy, a town and comune
- Sacco (river), Italy
- Sacco van der Made (1918–1997), Dutch actor
- SACCO, Savings and Credit Co-Operative Societies, a term used in Africa

== See also ==
- Bean bag chair or Sacco chair
- Ospedale Luigi Sacco, a hospital in Milan, Italy
- UN Sacco Ltd
- Saco (disambiguation)
