= Río Abajo, Ceiba, Puerto Rico =

Barrio of Puerto Rico

Río Abajo
- Barrio
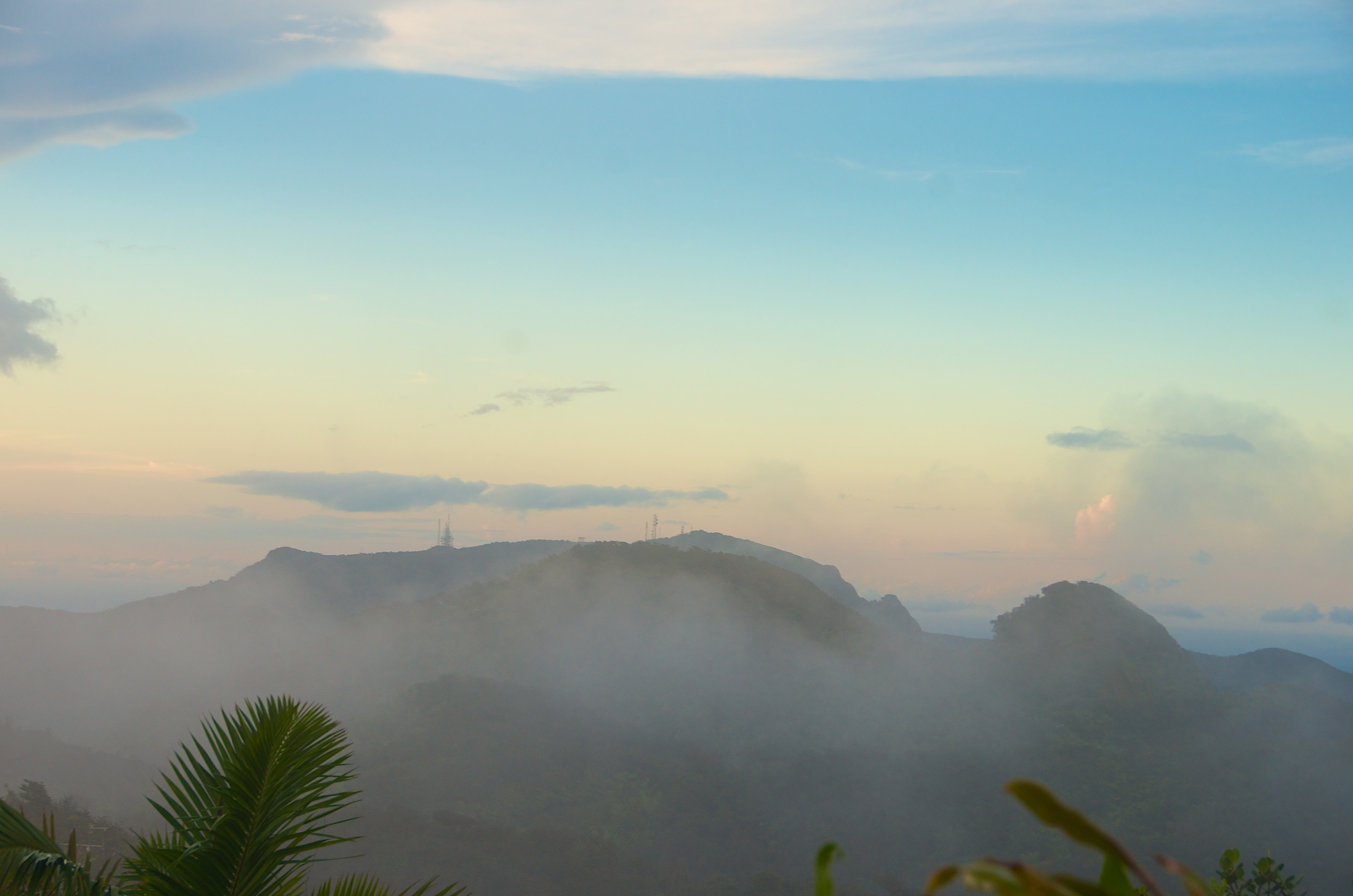
- View from Río Abajo in Ceiba

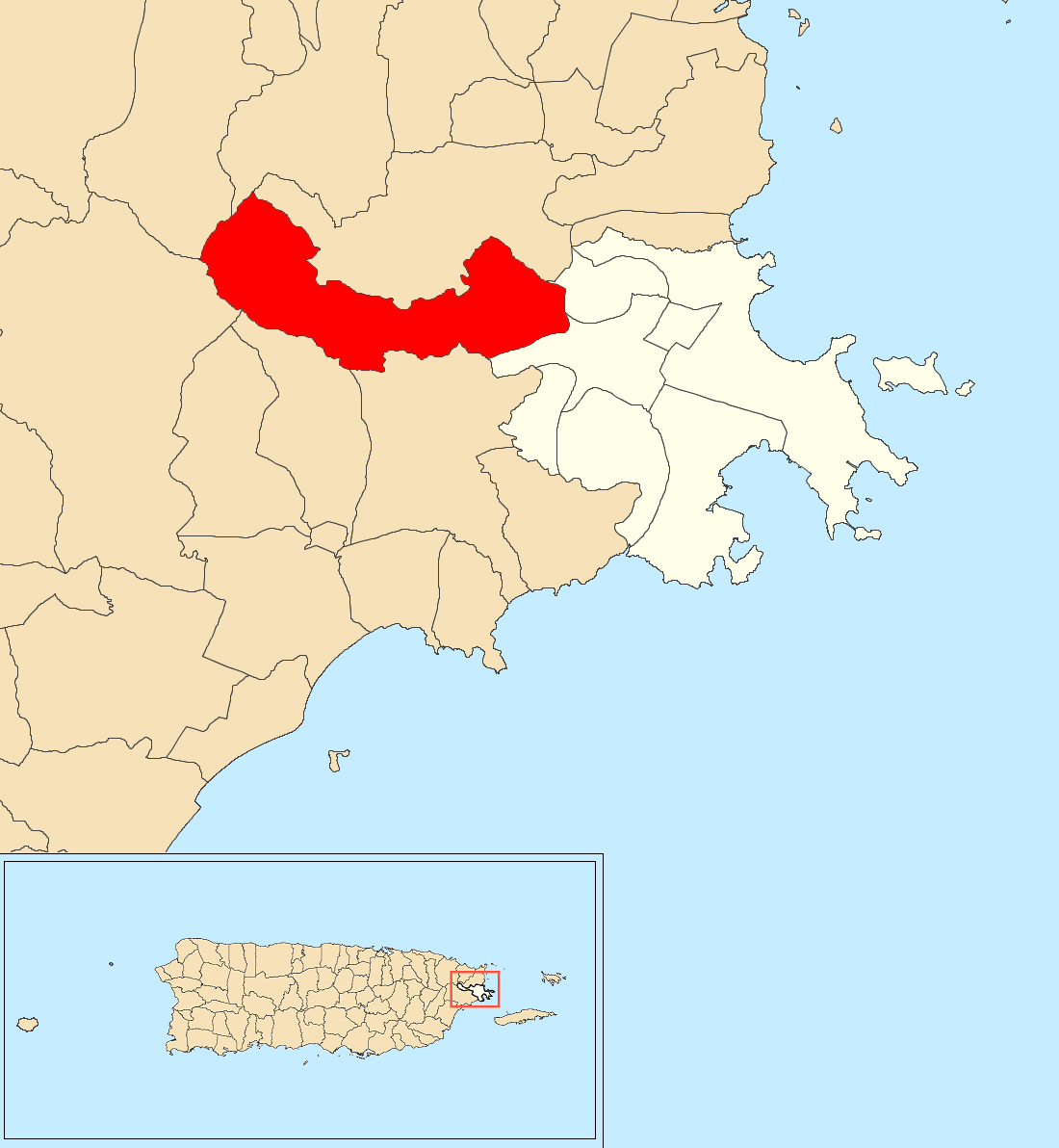
- Location of Río Abajo within the municipality of Ceiba shown in red

- Location of Puerto Rico
- Coordinates: 18°16′30″N 65°44′45″W
- Commonwealth: Puerto Rico
- Municipality: Ceiba

Area
  - Total: 8.02 sq mi (20.8 km^{2})
  - Land: 8.02 sq mi (20.8 km^{2})
  - Water: 0 sq mi (0 km^{2})
- Elevation: 351 ft (107 m)

Population (2010)
  - Total: 884
  - Density: 110.2/sq mi (42.5/km^{2})
- Source: 2010 Census
- Time zone: UTC−4 (AST)

Río Abajo is a barrio in the municipality of Ceiba, Puerto Rico. Its population in 2010 was 884.

== History ==
Río Abajo was in Spain's gazetteers until Puerto Rico was ceded by Spain in the aftermath of the Spanish–American War under the terms of the Treaty of Paris of 1898 and became an unincorporated territory of the United States. In 1899, the United States Department of War conducted a census of Puerto Rico finding that the combined population of Río Abajo and Daguao barrios (counted with Fajardo) was 1,099.

Historical population
Census	Pop.	Note	%±
1910	1,031		—
1920	1,273		23.5%
1930	1,354		6.4%
1940	1,238		−8.6%
1950	1,179		−4.8%
1960	464		−60.6%
1970	523		12.7%
1980	784		49.9%
1990	735		−6.2%
2000	871		18.5%
2010	884		1.5%
U.S. Decennial Census; 1900 (N/A) 1910-1930; 1930-1950 1980-2000 2010

== Sectors ==
Barrios (which are, in contemporary times, roughly comparable to minor civil divisions) in turn are further subdivided into smaller local populated place areas/units called sectores (sectors in English). The types of sectores may vary, from normally sector to urbanización to reparto to barriada to residencial, among others.

The following sectors are in Río Abajo barrio:

Camino Charco Frío, Sector La Paloma, Sector Rincón, and Sector Sonadora.

== Gallery ==
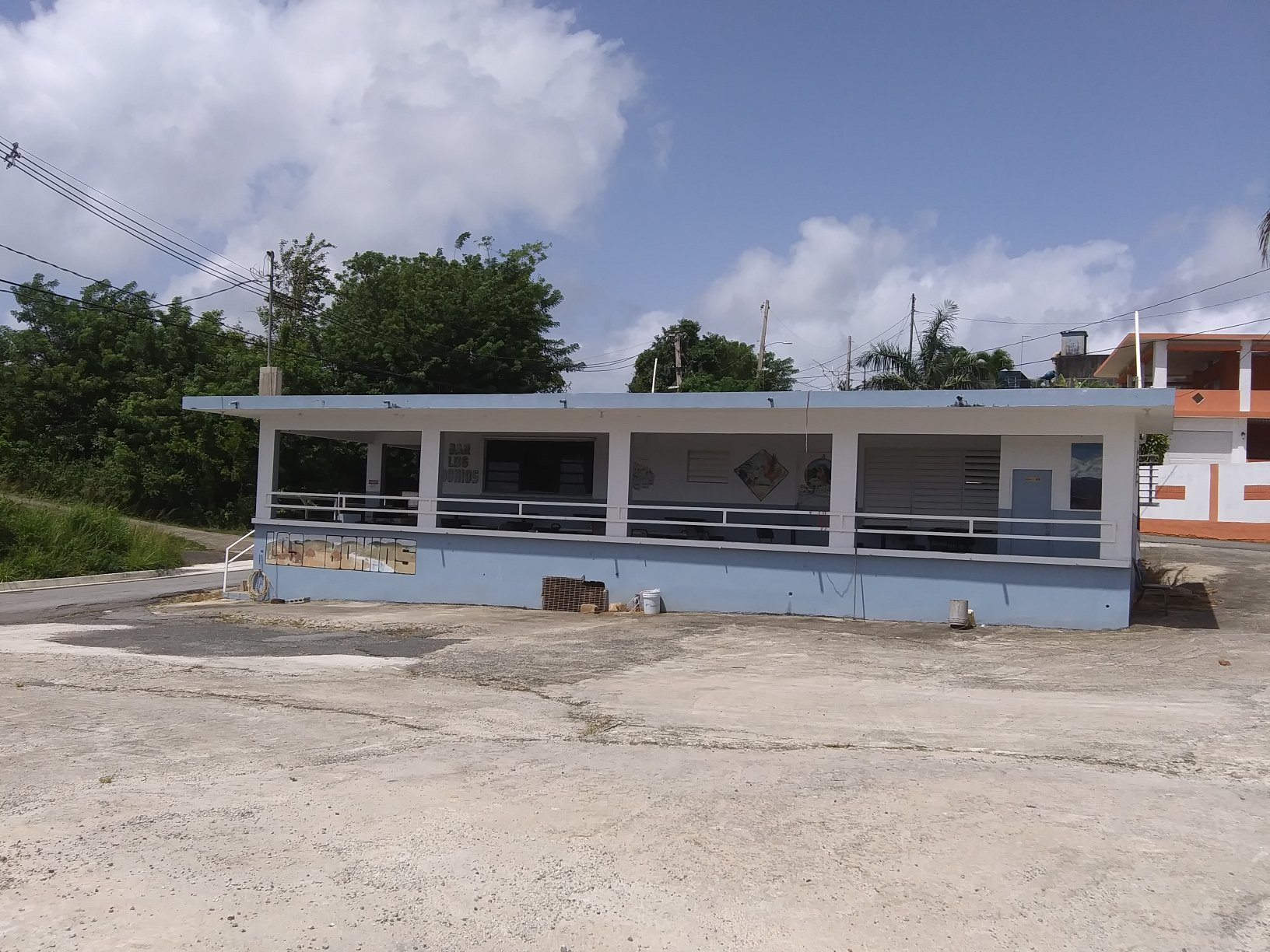
Bar Los Bohios de Jaime on PR-975 in Río Abajo

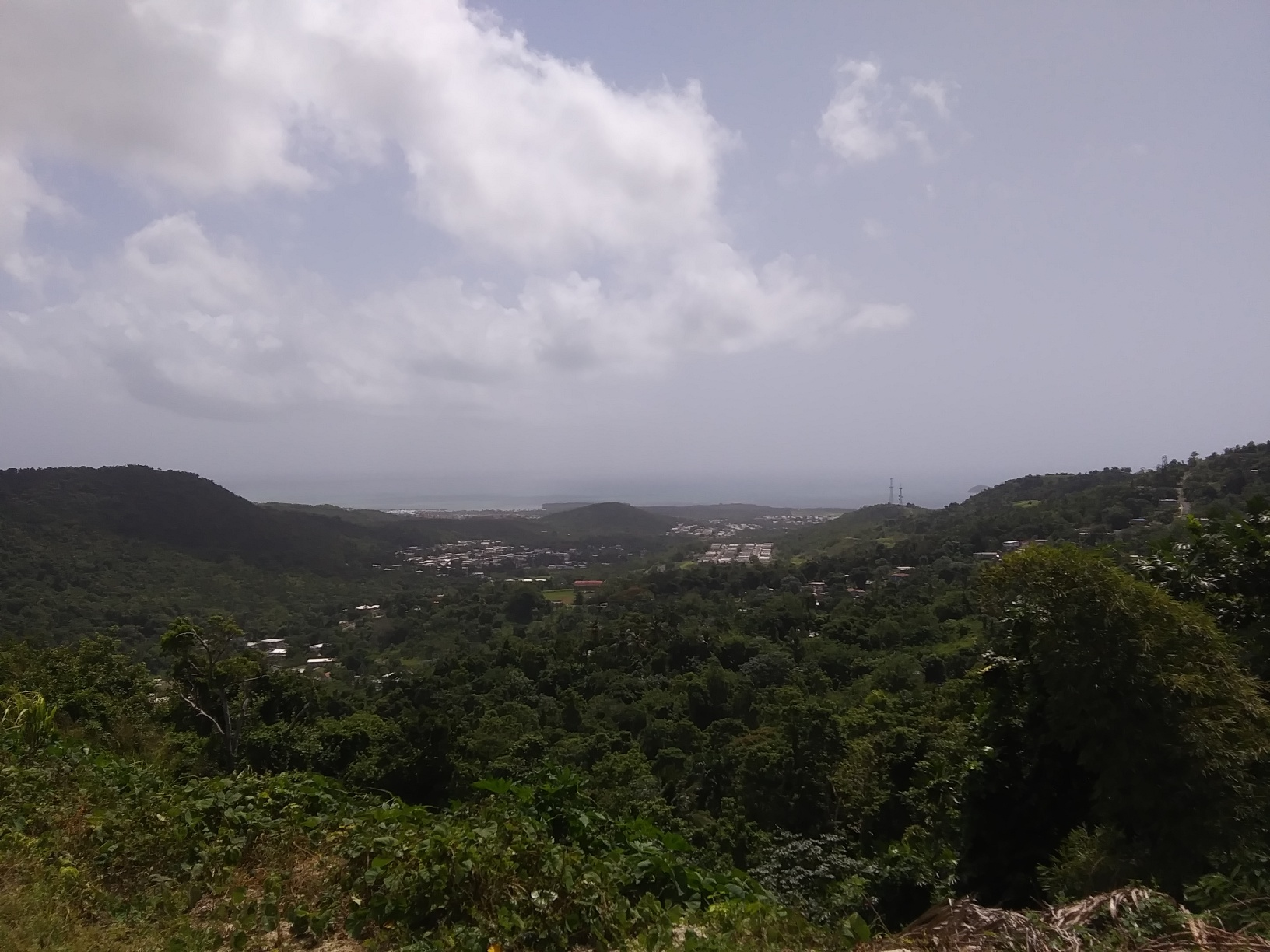
View from Los Bohios de Jaime on PR-975 in Río Abajo

== See also ==
- List of communities in Puerto Rico
- List of barrios and sectors of Ceiba, Puerto Rico
