= Machos, Ceiba, Puerto Rico =

Barrio of Puerto Rico

Machos
- Barrio
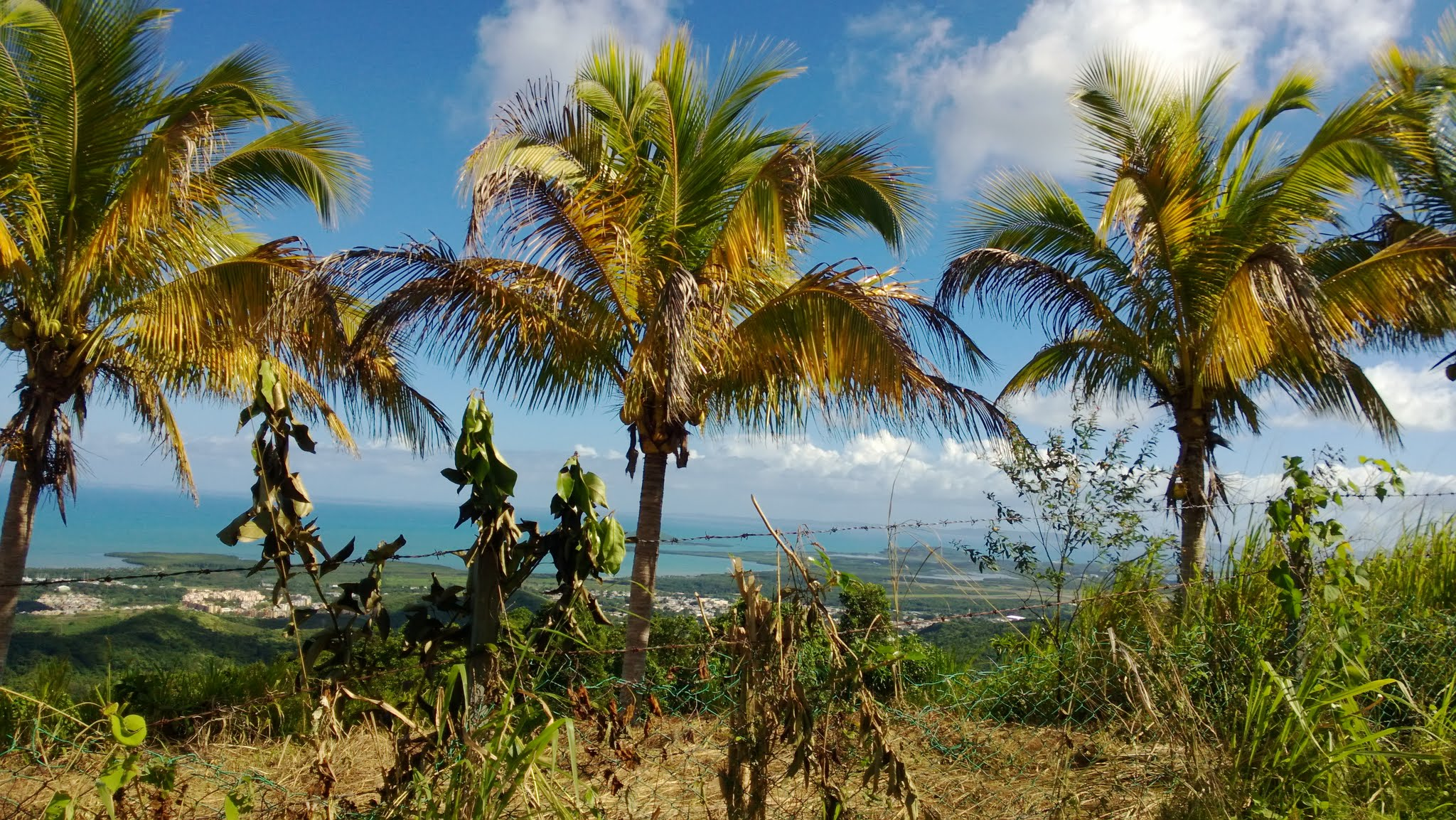
- Panorama from Machos barrio

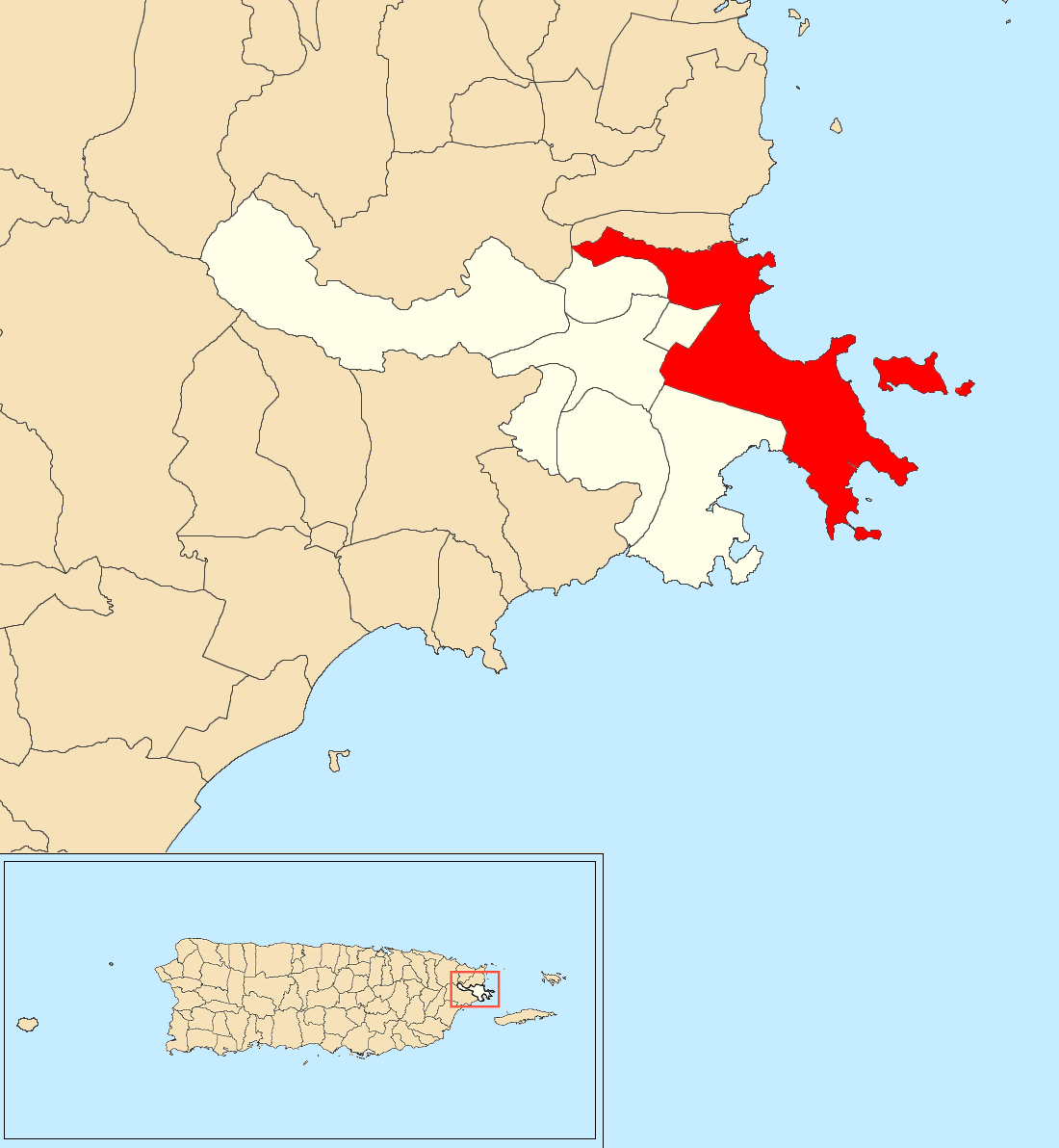
- Location of Machos within the municipality of Ceiba shown in red

- Location of Puerto Rico
- Coordinates: 18°15′12″N 65°37′15″W
- Commonwealth: Puerto Rico
- Municipality: Ceiba

Area
  - Total: 11.73 sq mi (30.4 km^{2})
  - Land: 7.84 sq mi (20.3 km^{2})
  - Water: 3.89 sq mi (10.1 km^{2})
- Elevation: 0 ft (0 m)

Population (2010)
  - Total: 3,567
  - Density: 455/sq mi (176/km^{2})
- Source: 2010 Census
- Time zone: UTC−4 (AST)

Machos is a barrio in the municipality of Ceiba, Puerto Rico. Its population in 2010 was 3,567.

== History ==
Machos was in Spain's gazetteers until Puerto Rico was ceded by Spain in the aftermath of the Spanish–American War under the terms of the Treaty of Paris of 1898 and became an unincorporated territory of the United States. In 1899, the United States Department of War conducted a census of Puerto Rico finding that the population of Machos was 461.

Historical population
Census	Pop.	Note	%±
1900	461		—
1910	565		22.6%
1920	733		29.7%
1930	829		13.1%
1940	788		−4.9%
1950	741		−6.0%
1960	1,009		36.2%
1970	0		−100.0%
1980	2,452		—
1990	3,731		52.2%
2000	4,186		12.2%
2010	3,567		−14.8%
U.S. Decennial Census; 1899 (shown as 1900) 1910-1930; 1930-1950 1980-2000 2010

== Sectors ==
Barrios (which are, in contemporary times, roughly comparable to minor civil divisions) in turn are further subdivided into smaller local populated place areas/units called sectores (sectors in English). The types of sectores may vary, from normally sector to urbanización to reparto to barriada to residencial, among others.

The following sectors are in Machos barrio:

Condominio Brisas Court, Condominio Castillos del Mar, Edificio Félix Ríos López, Edificio Mundo Plaza, Extensión Villas del Pilar, Parcelas Machos, Residencial La Seyba, Sector Cielito, Sector Mansiones de Brisas, Sector Polo Norte, Sector Punta Figueras, Urbanización Brisas de Ceiba, Urbanización Paseo de Ceiba, Urbanización River Valley, Urbanización Valle de Ceiba, Urbanización Vegas de Ceiba, Urbanización The Village at the Hill, and Urbanización Villas del Pilar.

== Gallery ==
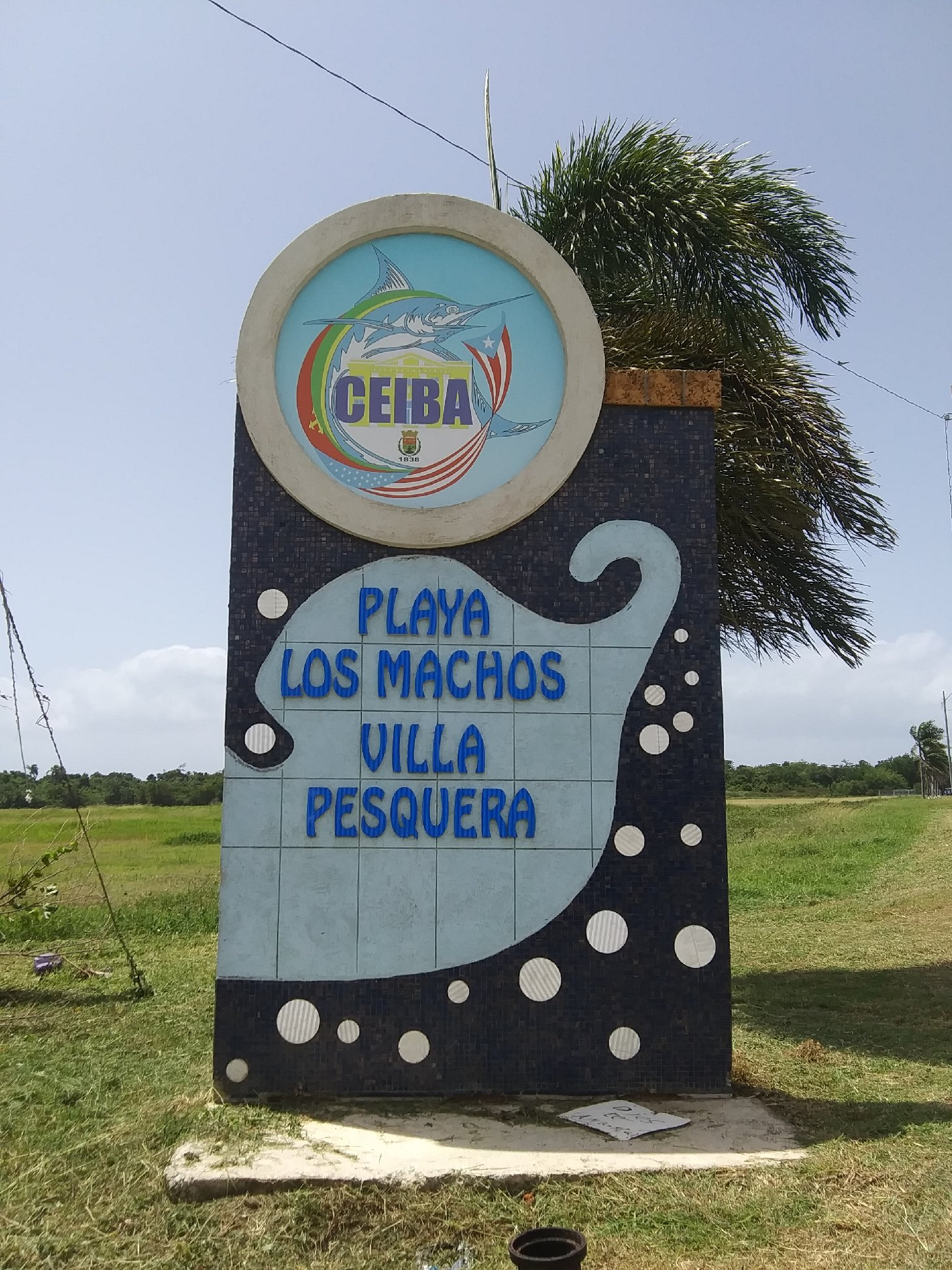
Los Machos Beach (Playa Los Machos)

== See also ==
- List of communities in Puerto Rico
- List of barrios and sectors of Ceiba, Puerto Rico
