= Clara Mathilda Faisst =

German pianist, composer and writer (1872–1948)

Clara Mathilda Faisst (22 June 1872 – 22 November 1948) was a German pianist, composer and writer.

== Early life ==
Clara Faisst was born in Karlsruhe, Baden to August and Emma Faisst. Her father died when she was one year old. She was the youngest of six children. Those close to her considered her to be quiet and dreamy as a child. Faisst suffered poor health throughout most of her childhood.

== Education ==
Her musical education began when she entered school. She received musical training from the Grand Ducal conservatory in Karlsruhe until 1894. At age 7, she was the youngest student ever taught by concertmaster Carl Will. She continued her studies at the Royal Academy of Music in Berlin until 1896. At the academy, she had many prestigious teachers. Clara Schumann’s student Ernst Rudorff taught her piano. Woldemar Bargiel (Schumann’s stepbrother) also taught her the theory of counterpoint and composition. Berlin composer Robert Kahn taught her piano and music theory. Her most well-known teacher was Max Bruch (1838 – 1920) who taught composition. She remained in correspondence with Bruch for most of his life. She composed the score for “Five Songs for a Voice with Pianoforte”, for which Max Bruch wrote lyrics and direction. She began writing poetry during her time at university.

== Career ==
Immediately after graduation in 1896, she undertook a longer concert tour with her own and foreign compositions through Germany and Switzerland Faisst returned to her hometown of Karlsruhe in 1901. She made her living as a composer, teacher, poet, and a performing pianist. Her compositions and interpretation of piano works gained her the public’s attention. Her vocal and instrumental works were publicly performed in Karlsruhe before the second world war. Her compositions are described as having very expressive melodies, and rich harmony reminiscent of late romanticism. She mostly self-published her work. She had pieces commissioned by various music stores in Karlsruhe. Twenty of her songs were published as music supplements in magazines. She composed works in large numbers. She composed 33 opus numbers.

During World War II, Faisst conducted house concerts. She was a prolific composer, producing over a hundred separate works, including ballads, choral pieces and sonatas for violin and piano. She corresponded with Albert Schweitzer and the two became good friends. Faisst never married and died in Karlsruhe, aged 76. As she had no family, her possessions were put out as trash, but some of her letters and music were rescued and preserved.

== Works ==
Selected works include:

- Adagio Consolante (1902)
- Violin Sonata (published 1912)
- Präludium im gotischen Stil, Op. 28
- Sieben Lieder aus des Knaben Wunderhorn, Op. 10
- Vier Lieder für eine Singstimme mit Pianoforte (Op. 16 and Op. 17 together)

Faisst was the author of the text Hörst du den Ton? (Can You Hear the Note?) published in 1924.
