= Saco (YTB-796) =

United States Navy ship

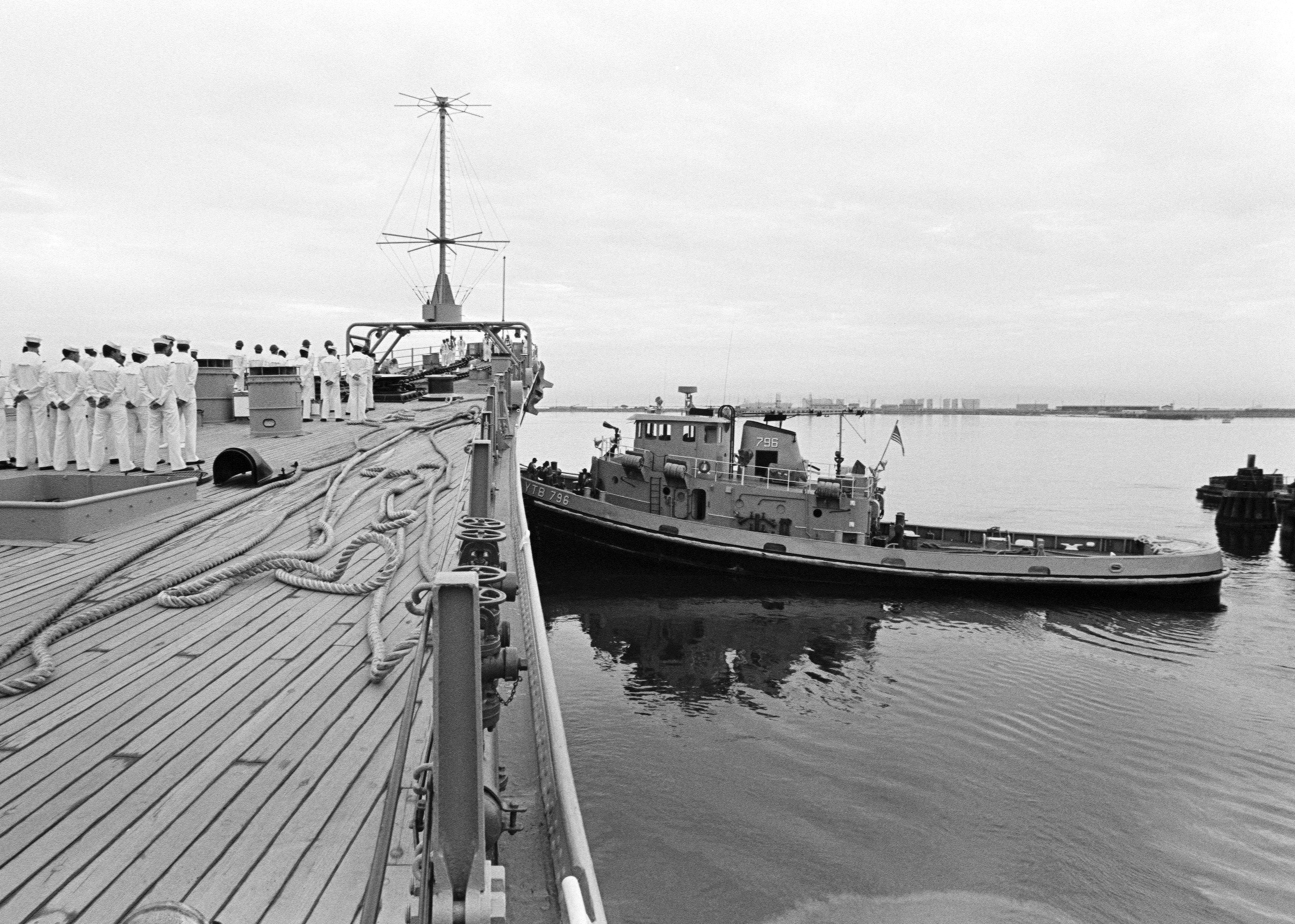
- USS Missouri (BB-63) Sea and anchor detail stand at parade rest as Saco (YTB-796) maneuvers the battleship into port at Naval Station Long Beach, California, 24 August 1988.

History

United States
- Ordered: 15 June 1967
- Builder: Marinette Marine, Marinette, Wisconsin
- Laid down: 12 January 1968
- Launched: 3 July 1968
- Acquired: 8 January 1969
- Fate: Scrapped, 30 May 2005

General characteristics
- Class & type: Natick-class large harbor tug
- Displacement: 283 long tons (288 t) (light); 356 long tons (362 t) (full)
- Length: 109 ft (33 m)
- Beam: 31 ft (9.4 m)
- Draft: 14 ft (4.3 m)
- Speed: 12 knots (14 mph; 22 km/h)
- Complement: 12
- Armament: None

Saco (YTB-796) was a United States Navy Natick-class large harbor tug named for Saco, Maine. She was the third navy ship to bear the name.

== Construction ==
The contract for Saco was awarded 15 June 1967. She was laid down on 12 January 1968 at Marinette, Wisconsin, by Marinette Marine and launched 3 July 1968.

== Operational history ==
Placed in service on 14 September 1968, Saco was assigned to Naval Station Guam. She served there until reassignment to Naval Station Long Beach, California, where she served for the remainder of her career.

Stricken from the Navy List 9 June 2004, Saco was scrapped 30 May 2005.
