= Saco River (disambiguation) =

Saco River may refer to:

- Saco River, a river in northeastern New Hampshire and southwestern Maine in the United States
  - East Branch Saco River, a 13.2-mile-long (21.2 km) river in the White Mountains of New Hampshire, a tributary of the Saco River
    - East Fork East Branch Saco River, a 2.2-mile-long (3.5 km) tributary of the East Branch of the Saco River
  - Little Saco River, a 4.5-mile-long (7.2 km) tributary of the Saco River in western Maine
  - Old Course Saco River, a 21.9-mile-long (35.2 km) river in western Maine, the route of the Saco River until the early 1800s
- Saco River (Maranhão), a river of Maranhão state in northeastern Brazil
- Saco River (Paracauari), a river in the state of Pará, Brazil, a left tributary of the Paracauari River
- Do Saco River (Rio de Janeiro), a river of Rio de Janeiro state in southeastern Brazil

== See also ==
- Sacco (river), a river in Italy
