= Ottilie Sutro =

American concert pianist (1872–1970)

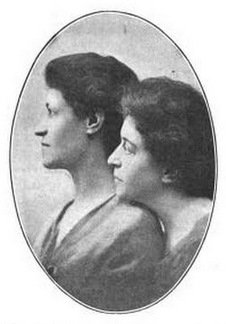
Ottilie Sutro with her sister Rose Laura Sutro

Ottilie Sutro (4 January 1872 – 12 September 1970) was an American concert pianist. Ottilie and her sister Rose Laura Sutro (1870 – 1957), popularly known as “Sutro sisters” were “a well known duo piano team.”

== Biography ==
Ottilie Sutro was born on 4 January 1872 in Baltimore. Her father Ottu Sutro was a musician. Sutro sisters studied piano from Heinrich Barth at the Berlin Musikhochschule. In 1894 they successfully made their first appearance in London. On their return to America, they had their first concert with Anton Seidl at the New York Philharmonic Orchestra.

Sutro sisters, Hinson claims, were “an outstanding two-piano team.”

Ottilie died on 12 September 1970 in Baltimore.

== See also ==
- Rose and Ottilie Sutro
