= Fatimatou Sacko =

French basketball player (born 1985)

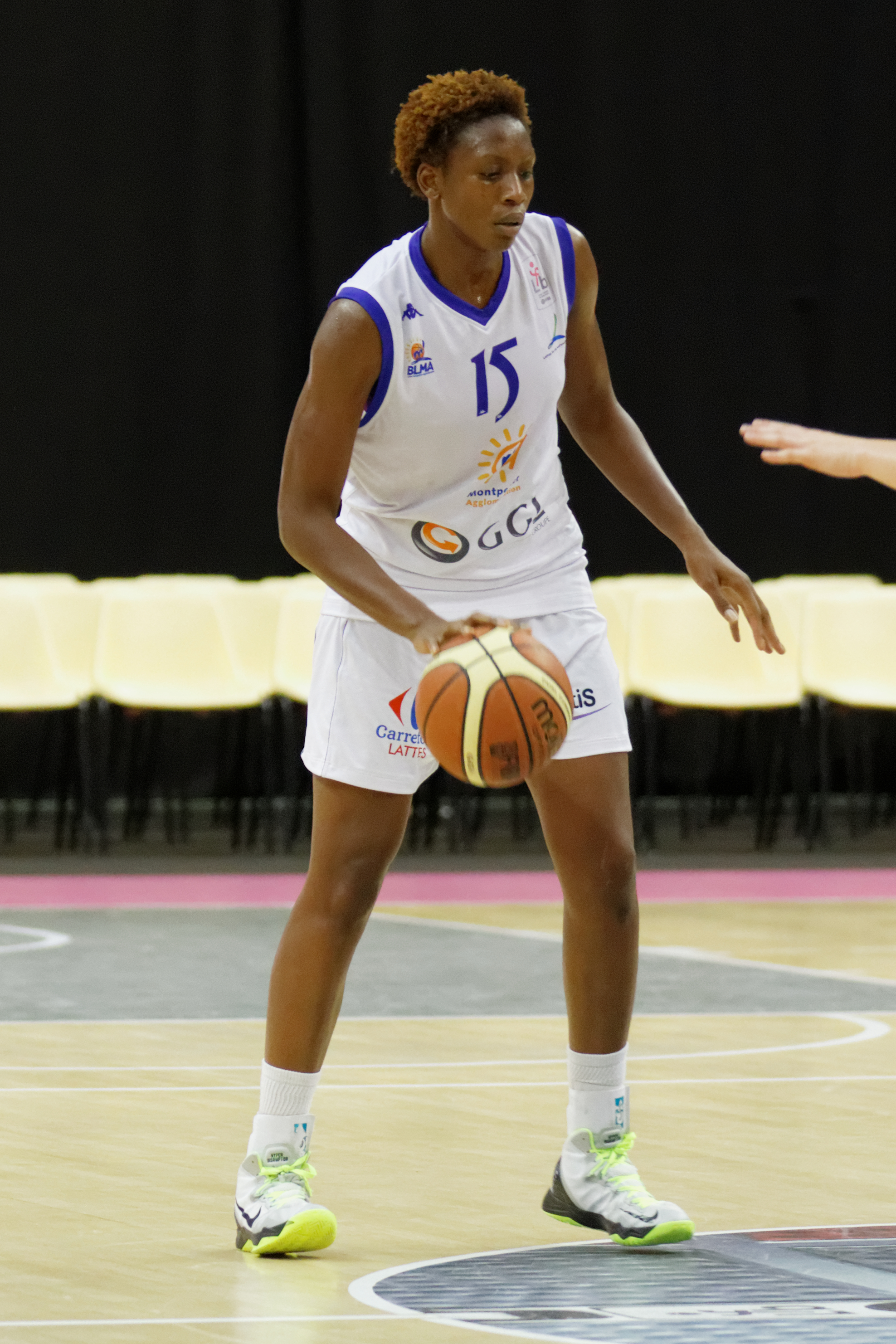
Image of Fatimatou Sacko

Fatimatou Sacko (born April 12, 1985 in Paris) is a French basketball player. She plays for Basket Lattes Montpellier Agglomération in the country's top women's league, the Ligue Féminine de Basketball.
