= Madiga Sacko =

- Commune and village
- Location in Mali
- Coordinates: 14.362°N 9.306°W
- Country: Mali
- Region: Kayes Region
- Cercle: Diéma Cercle

Area
  - Total: 426 km^{2} (164 sq mi)

Population (2009 census)
  - Total: 12,690
  - Density: 29.8/km^{2} (77.2/sq mi)
- Time zone: UTC+0 (GMT)

Madiga Sacko is a rural commune and village in the Diéma Cercle in the Kayes Region of western Mali. The commune includes the villages of Guédéguilé, Souranguédou and Bagamabougou as well as the main village (chef-lieu) of Madiga Sacko. In the 2009 census the commune had a population of 12,690.
