= Chupacallos, Ceiba, Puerto Rico =

Barrio of Puerto Rico

Chupacallos
- Barrio
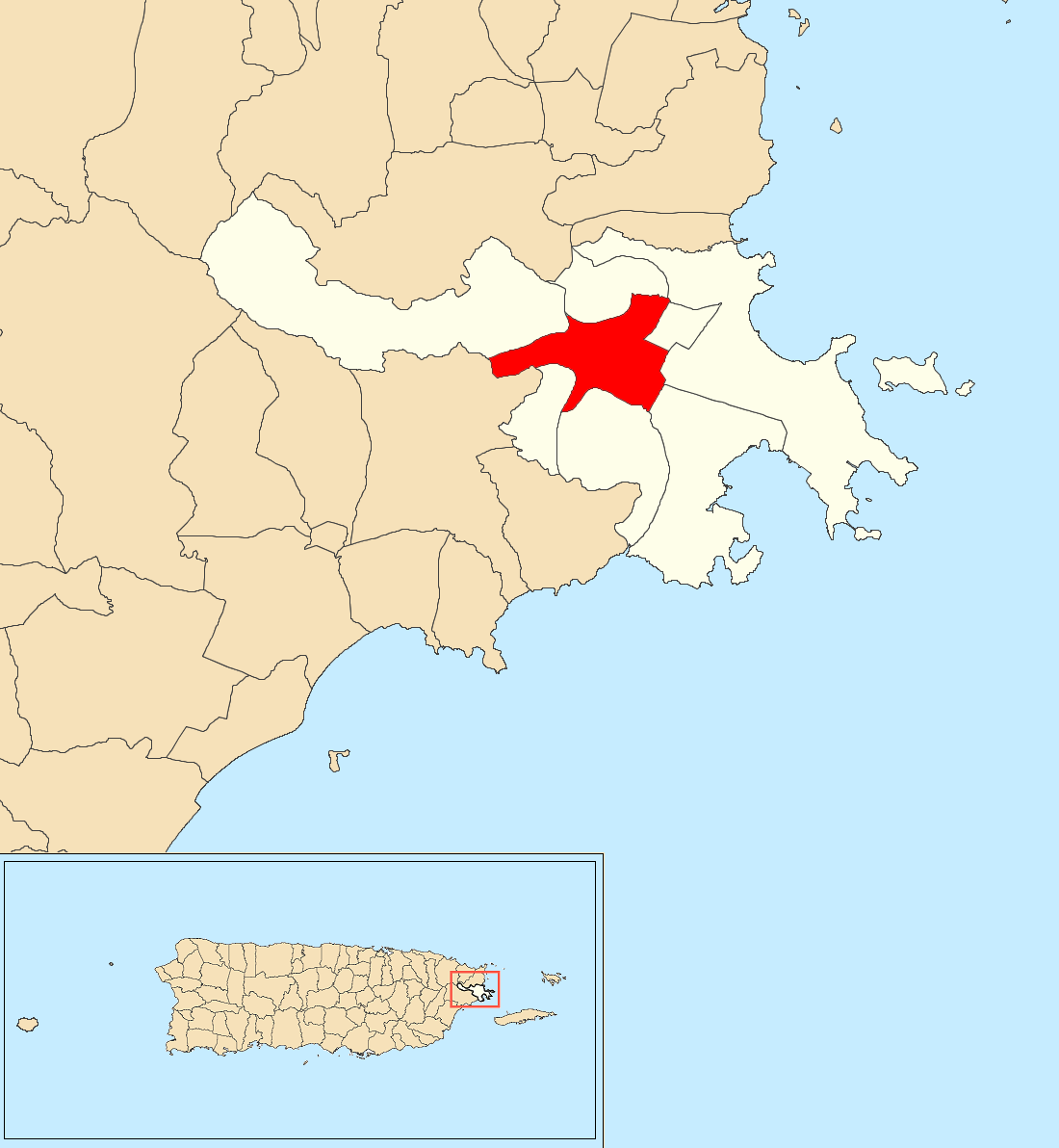
- Location of Chupacallos within the municipality of Ceiba shown in red

- Location of Puerto Rico
- Coordinates: 18°15′23″N 65°40′03″W
- Commonwealth: Puerto Rico
- Municipality: Ceiba

Area
  - Total: 2.76 sq mi (7.1 km^{2})
  - Land: 2.76 sq mi (7.1 km^{2})
  - Water: 0 sq mi (0 km^{2})
- Elevation: 325 ft (99 m)

Population (2010)
  - Total: 2,036
  - Density: 737.7/sq mi (284.8/km^{2})
- Source: 2010 Census
- Time zone: UTC−4 (AST)

Chupacallos is a barrio in the municipality of Ceiba, Puerto Rico. Its population in 2010 was 2,036.

== History ==
Chupacallos was in Spain's gazetteers until Puerto Rico was ceded by Spain in the aftermath of the Spanish–American War under the terms of the Treaty of Paris of 1898 and became an unincorporated territory of the United States. In 1899, the United States Department of War conducted a census of Puerto Rico finding that the combined population of Chupacallos and Saco barrios was 1,109.

Historical population
Census	Pop.	Note	%±
1910	760		—
1920	1,082		42.4%
1930	1,269		17.3%
1940	1,033		−18.6%
1950	1,464		41.7%
1960	1,799		22.9%
1970	2,804		55.9%
1980	2,704		−3.6%
1990	2,240		−17.2%
2000	2,265		1.1%
2010	2,036		−10.1%
U.S. Decennial Census; 1900 (N/A) 1910-1930; 1930-1950 1980-2000 2010

== Sectors ==
Barrios (which are, in contemporary times, roughly comparable to minor civil divisions) in turn are further subdivided into smaller local populated place areas/units called sectores (sectors in English). The types of sectores may vary, from normally sector to urbanización to reparto to barriada to residencial, among others.

The following sectors are in Chupacallos barrio:

Parcelas Aguas Claras, Sector El Corcho, Sector El Panal, Sector Las Quintas, Sector Silén, and Urbanización Mansiones Vista de Mar.

== See also ==
- List of communities in Puerto Rico
- List of barrios and sectors of Ceiba, Puerto Rico
