= Saco, Ceiba, Puerto Rico =

Barrio of Puerto Rico

Saco
- Barrio
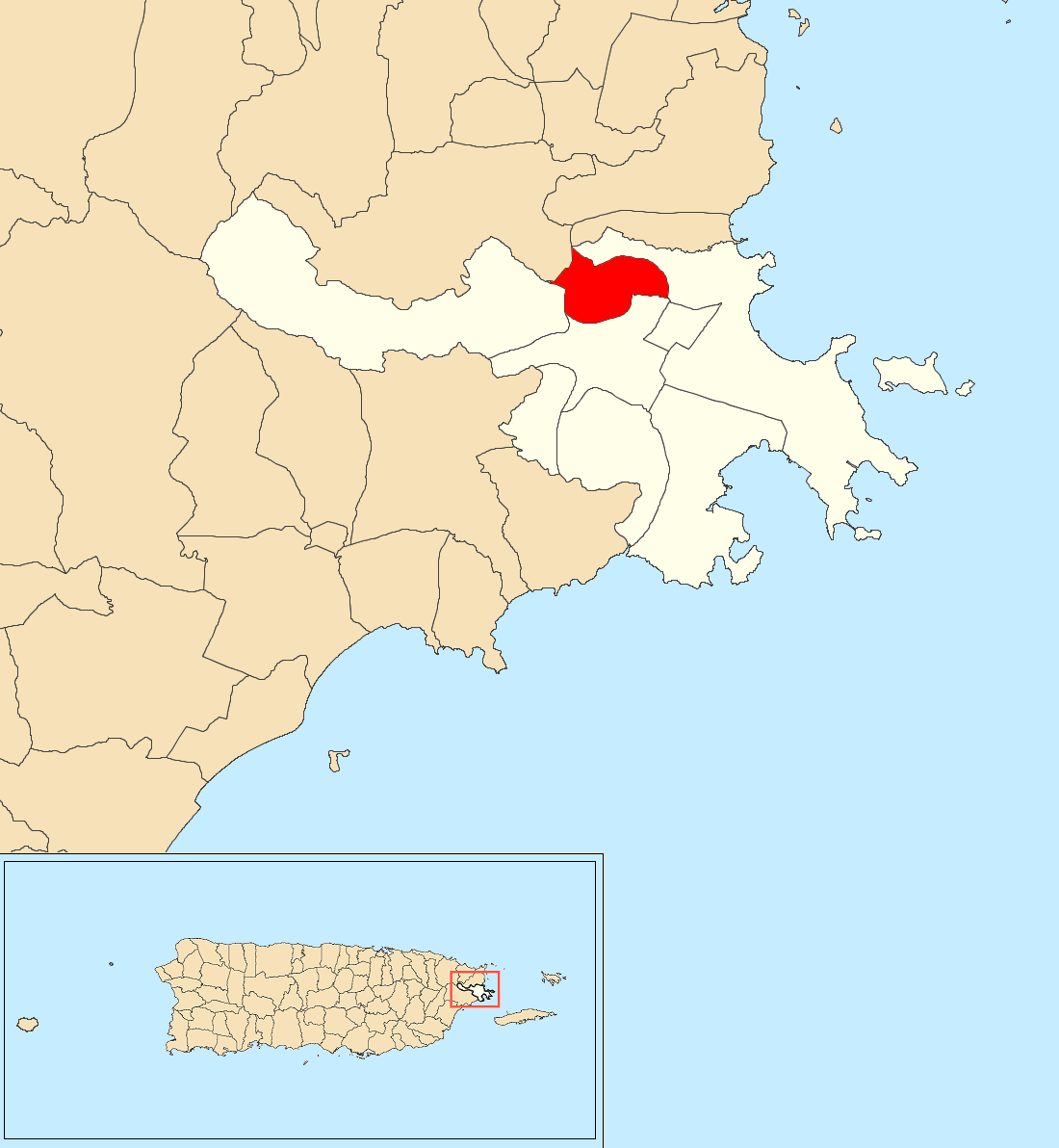
- Location of Saco within the municipality of Ceiba shown in red

- Location of Puerto Rico
- Coordinates: 18°16′35″N 65°40′07″W
- Commonwealth: Puerto Rico
- Municipality: Ceiba

Area
  - Total: 1.45 sq mi (3.8 km^{2})
  - Land: 1.45 sq mi (3.8 km^{2})
  - Water: 0 sq mi (0 km^{2})
- Elevation: 187 ft (57 m)

Population (2010)
  - Total: 1,815
  - Density: 1,251.7/sq mi (483.3/km^{2})
- Source: 2010 Census
- Time zone: UTC−4 (AST)

Saco is a barrio in the municipality of Ceiba, Puerto Rico. Its population in 2010 was 1,815.

== History ==
Saco was in Spain's gazetteers until Puerto Rico was ceded by Spain in the aftermath of the Spanish–American War under the terms of the Treaty of Paris of 1898 and became an unincorporated territory of the United States. In 1899, the United States Department of War conducted a census of Puerto Rico finding that the combined population of Saco and Chupacallos barrios was 1,109.

Historical population
Census	Pop.	Note	%±
1910	760		—
1920	1,082		42.4%
1930	1,269		17.3%
1940	752		−40.7%
1950	808		7.4%
1960	702		−13.1%
1970	896		27.6%
1980	1,037		15.7%
1990	1,482		42.9%
2000	1,819		22.7%
2010	1,815		−0.2%
U.S. Decennial Census; 1900 (N/A) 1910-1930; 1930-1950 1980-2000 2010

== Sectors ==
Barrios (which are, in contemporary times, roughly comparable to minor civil divisions) in turn are further subdivided into smaller local populated place areas/units called sectores (sectors in English). The types of sectores may vary, from normally sector to urbanización to reparto to barriada to residencial, among others.

The following sectors are in Saco barrio:

Parcelas Calderona, Sector Aguacate, Sector El Mangó, and Sector Las Quintas.

== See also ==
- List of communities in Puerto Rico
- List of barrios and sectors of Ceiba, Puerto Rico
