= Daguao, Ceiba, Puerto Rico =

Barrio of Puerto Rico

Daguao
- Barrio
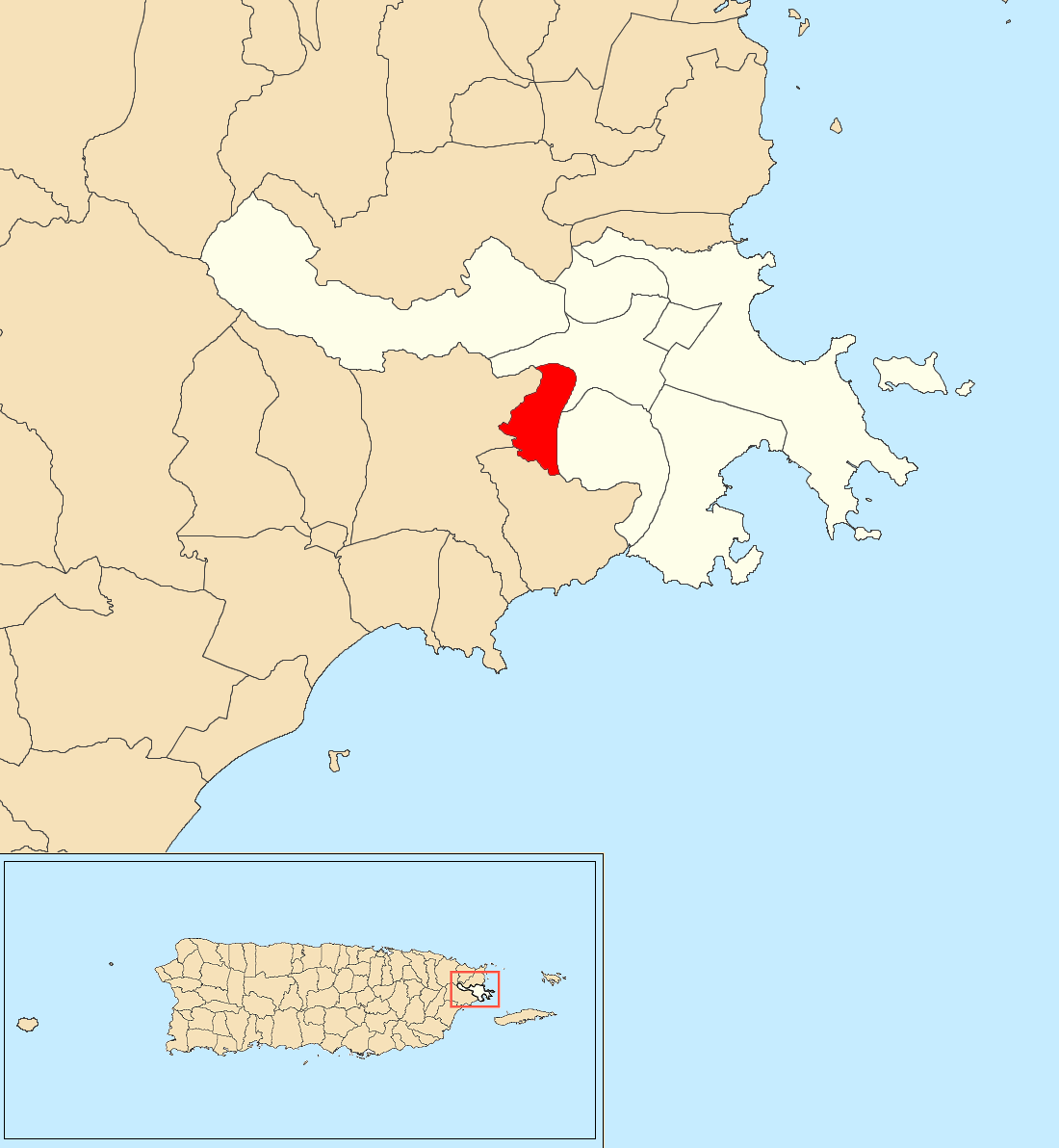
- Location of Daguao within the municipality of Ceiba shown in red

- Location of Puerto Rico
- Coordinates: 18°14′26″N 65°40′51″W
- Commonwealth: Puerto Rico
- Municipality: Ceiba

Area
  - Total: 1.17 sq mi (3.0 km^{2})
  - Land: 1.17 sq mi (3.0 km^{2})
  - Water: 0 sq mi (0 km^{2})
- Elevation: 574 ft (175 m)

Population (2010)
  - Total: 235
  - Density: 200.9/sq mi (77.6/km^{2})
- Source: 2010 Census
- Time zone: UTC−4 (AST)

Daguao is a barrio in the municipality of Ceiba, Puerto Rico. Its population in 2010 was 235.

== History ==
Daguao was in Spain's gazetteers until Puerto Rico was ceded by Spain in the aftermath of the Spanish–American War under the terms of the Treaty of Paris of 1898 and became an unincorporated territory of the United States. In 1899, the United States Department of War conducted a census of Puerto Rico finding that the combined population of Daguao and Río Abajo barrios (counted with Fajardo) was 1,099.

The old Roosevelt Roads Naval Base is near Daguao, and 40% of the land in Daguao has been designated as conservation land. This extensive protected natural area is home to ecosystems such as wetlands, estuaries, mangrove forests, coral systems, marine habitats, riverbanks and dry forests. Los Machos wetland in Daguao makes up the 10% mangroves that remain in Puerto Rico.

Historical population
Census	Pop.	Note	%±
1910	121		—
1920	203		67.8%
1930	259		27.6%
1940	487		88.0%
1950	242		−50.3%
1960	198		−18.2%
1970	101		−49.0%
1980	109		7.9%
1990	162		48.6%
2000	237		46.3%
2010	235		−0.8%
U.S. Decennial Census; 1900 (N/A) 1910-1930; 1930-1950 1980-2000 2010

== Sectors ==
Barrios (which are, in contemporary times, roughly comparable to minor civil divisions) in turn are further subdivided into smaller local populated place areas/units called sectores (sectors in English). The types of sectores may vary, from normally sector to urbanización to reparto to barriada to residencial, among others.

The following sectors are in Daguao barrio:

Sector Los Millones.

== See also ==
- List of communities in Puerto Rico
- List of barrios and sectors of Ceiba, Puerto Rico
