= Joseph Callaerts =

Belgian composer and musician (1830–1901)

Joseph Callaerts (11 August 1830 – 3 March 1901) was a Belgian organist, carillonneur, composer and music teacher. He was an important member of the Belgian school of organ playing.

== Biography ==
Joseph Callaerts (sometimes referred to as Jozef) was born in 1830 in Antwerp, and spent nearly all of his life in that city. He started learning music when he was a boy, singing in Antwerp's choir of the Cathedral of Our Lady. As a young man, he studied the organ with Jacques-Nicolas Lemmens at the Brussels Royal Conservatoire, and he won the first prize in organ at that institution in 1856.

Starting in 1850, Callaerts served as the organist at the Jesuit College in Antwerp. In 1855 he became the organist at Antwerp Cathedral and in 1863 he became carillonneur of the city of Antwerp. From 1867 on, he taught organ and harmony at the Royal Conservatoire of Antwerp, which had its name changed to the Royal Flemish Conservatoire in 1898. He also gave expert advice in the building of several organs.

Callaerts's compositions include an opera called Le Retour imprévu, a symphony, a piano concerto, an organ concerto, a violin and orchestra concertpiece, chamber music, choral music, songs and many works for solo organ and solo piano.

== Selected works ==
- Stage work
  - Opera Le Retour imprévu (Antwerp 1889)
- Orchestral works
  - Grande Fantaisie de Concert for organ and orchestra Op. 4
  - Symphonic poem Le Retour d'Ulysse
  - Symphony (1879)
- Vocal work
  - Lentevreugd for two tenor and two bass voices
  - Messe, graduel & offertoire for four-part chorus (or soloists) and organ Op. 4
  - Mass for soprano, alto, bass and organ Op. 24
  - At least 2 other masses
  - Cantata Le temps des études (Het studieleven) for solo, chorus (three equal voices), and orchestra, Op. 19
- Chamber music
  - Trio in A minor for piano, violin and cello Op. 15 (1882)
  - Andante sostenuto for cello or violin and piano Op. 16
- Piano works
  - Piano sonata Op. 3
  - Impromptu Op. 6
  - Caprice Op. 8
  - Fantaisie-Barcarolle Op. 11
  - Air de Ballade op. 15
  - Roosje uit de dalen
  - Symphony for piano 4 hands
- Organ works
  - Fifteen Improvisations Op. 1
  - Grande Fantaisie de Concert Op. 5
  - 24 pieces for organ in 2 series each with 4 books:
    - book I: Pastorale, Méditation, Marche Solennelle Op. 20
    - book II: Adoration, Canzone, Sortie Solennelle Op. 21
    - book III: Prière, Petite Fantaisie, Marche Nuptiale Op. 22
    - book IV: Cantilène, Communion, Toccata et Final Op. 23
    - book V: Mélodie, Invocation, Marche de Fête Op. 28
    - book VI: Toccata, Offertoire et Duo, Marche Funèbre Op. 29
    - book VII: Prière (No. 2), Allegro Giocoso, Marche Triomphale Op. 30
    - book VIII: Elégie, Bénediction Nuptiale, Scherzo Op. 31
  - Adoration
  - Intermezzo in B♭ minor (1898)
  - Invocation
  - Prayer No. 1 and No. 2
  - Solennelle marche
  - Tantum ergo
  - two sonatas: No. 1 in C minor, No. 2 in A major (posthumously published in 1908)

== Sources ==
- Baker's Biographical Dictionary of Music and Musicians (1900), p 98
