= Ceiba, Puerto Rico =

Town and municipality in Puerto Rico

Ceiba Municipio de Ceiba
- Town and Municipality
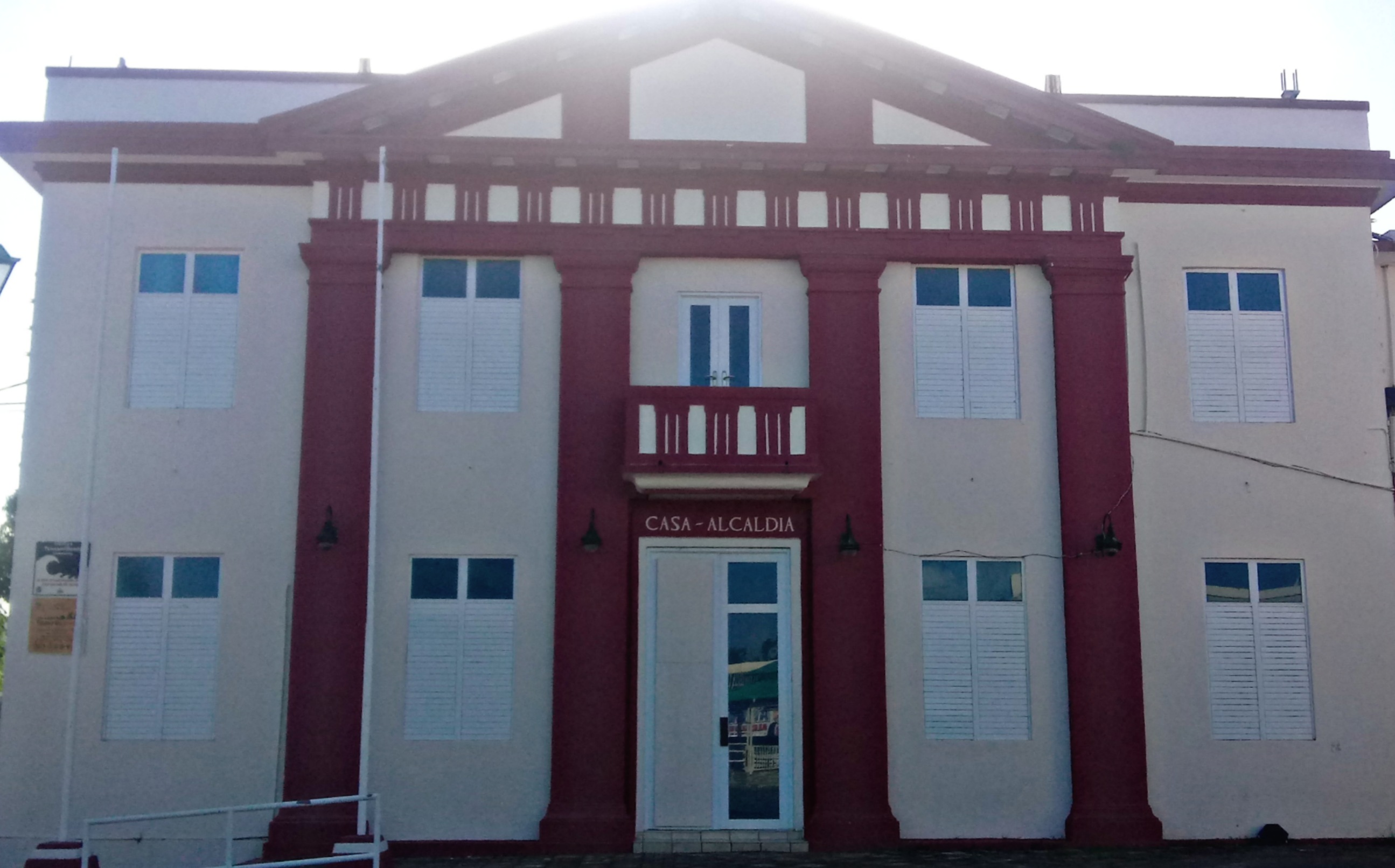
- Town Hall of Ceiba

- Flag Coat of arms
- Nicknames: "Los Come Sopas", "La Ciudad del Marlin", "Los Sin Sopa"
- Anthem: "Ceiba"
- Map of Puerto Rico highlighting Ceiba Municipality
- Coordinates: 18°14′17″N 65°37′40″W
- Sovereign state: United States
- Commonwealth: Puerto Rico
- Founded: April 7, 1838
- Founder: Luis de la Cruz
- Barrios: 8 barrios: Ceiba barrio-pueblo; Chupacallos; Daguao; Guayacán; Machos; Quebrada Seca; Río Abajo; Saco

Government
  - Mayor: Samuel “Sammy” Rivera Báez (PNP)
  - Senatorial dist.: 8 - Carolina
  - Representative dist.: 36

Area
  - Total: 77.33 sq mi (200.28 km^{2})
  - Land: 27.2 sq mi (70.5 km^{2})
  - Water: 50.11 sq mi (129.78 km^{2})

Population (2020)
  - Total: 11,307
  - Estimate (2025): 10,559 ▼
  - Rank: 73rd in Puerto Rico
  - Density: 415/sq mi (160/km^{2})
- Demonym: ceibeños
- Time zone: UTC−4 (AST)
- ZIP Codes: 00735, 00742
- Area code: 787/939

Ceiba (Spanish pronunciation: [ˈsejβa]) is both a small town and a municipality in northeast Puerto Rico. It is named after the famous Ceiba tree. Ceiba is located in the north-east coast of the island, bordering the Atlantic Ocean, south of Fajardo, north of Naguabo and southeast of Río Grande. Located about one hour's driving distance from San Juan, Ceiba is spread over 7 barrios and Ceiba Pueblo (the downtown area and administrative center). It is part of the Fajardo Metropolitan Statistical Area.

== History ==
Ceiba was founded on April 7, 1838 by Luis de la Cruz. Ceiba derives its name from an Indian word Seyba, which is the name for a famous tree that grows in the island, Ceiba pentandra, the kapok tree.

Puerto Rico was ceded by Spain in the aftermath of the Spanish–American War under the terms of the Treaty of Paris of 1898 and became a territory of the United States. In 1899, the United States Department of War conducted a census of Puerto Rico and the population numbers of Ceiba were consolidated with the population numbers of Fajardo.

Ceiba, situated near Fajardo, used to be home of an American military Naval base, the Roosevelt Roads Naval Station. Most of the units were relocated and the base was closed in 2004. Ex-governor Sila María Calderón suggested turning the property into a major international airport, to serve as a relief to Luis Muñoz Marín International Airport in San Juan, and to increase the number of international airlines that operate into Puerto Rico. She was met with skepticism about these plans from such groups as environmentalists, economists and others, but in 2008, José Aponte de la Torre Airport was inaugurated at the base's former site.

Locals are commonly known as "Los Come Sopa" (Spanish for 'the soup-eaters'). Even though there is no official reason as to why they are called this, a few stories have been suggested. Among the tales is the belief that since the town did not have a local meat market people had to travel long distances in order to buy some meat and therefore mostly ate soup.

Hurricane Maria on September 20, 2017 triggered numerous landslides in Ceiba. Forty-nine structures in Punta Figuera were destroyed completely. In July 2018, some residents received monies via FEMA to rebuild their homes.

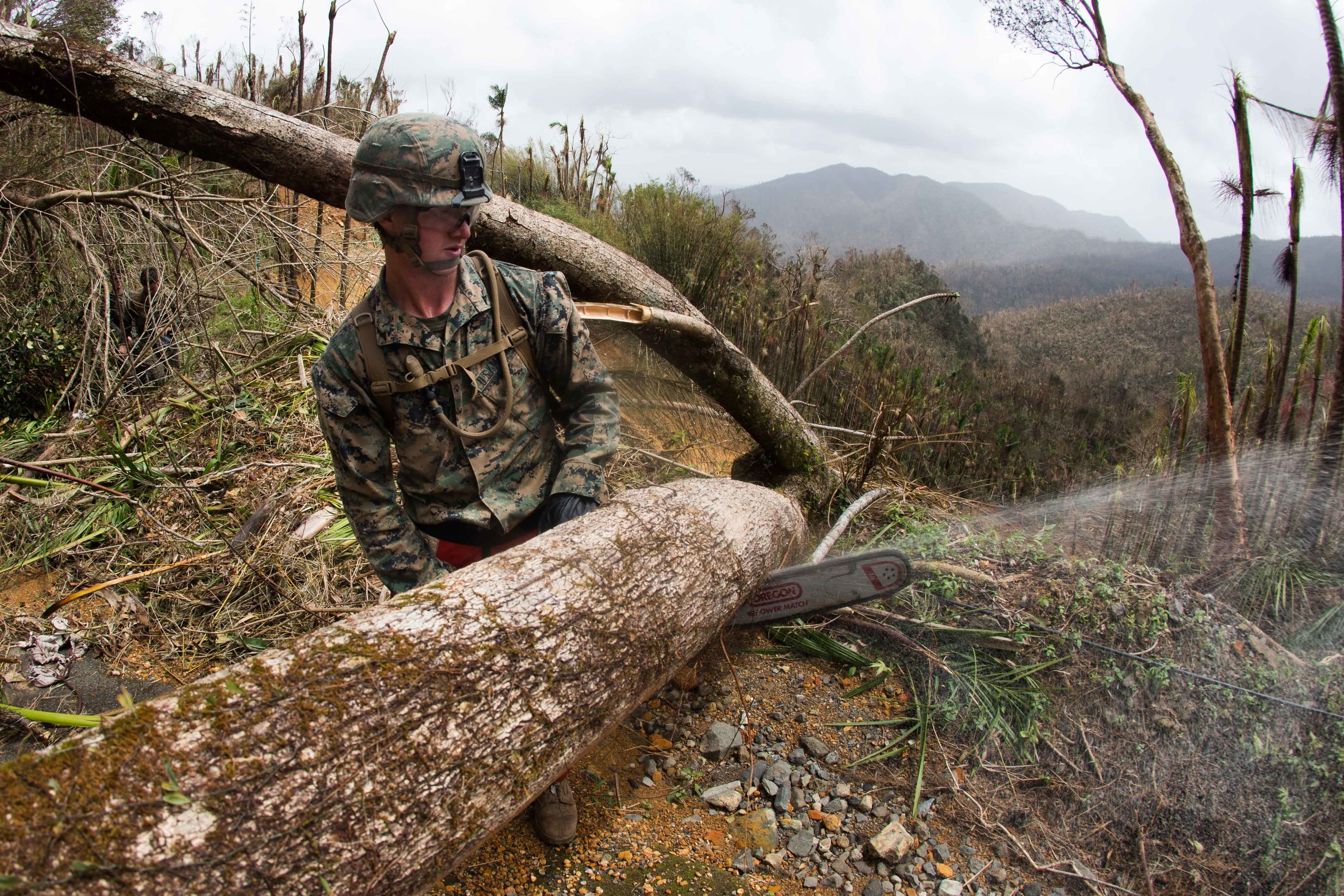
National Guard working in Ceiba after the hurricane

== Geography ==
The Reserva Natural Medio Mundo y Daguao (Nature Reserve Medio Mundo and Daguao) extends along the coastline between Ceiba and Fajardo. 95% of the forest is classified as mangrove. Various species of birds can be seen as well as turtles and manatees. Its rivers includes; Río Daguao, Río Demajagua and Río Fajardo.

The municipality extends northwest into the seas between Fajardo and Culebra and thereby includes the reefs and islets named Arrecifes Hermanos and Arrecifes Barriles. The reef are closest to the coastal barrio of Machos, but barrio boundaries are not defined in that area.

The highest point in the municipality is Pico del Oeste in the Sierra de Luquillo at 3,346 feet (1,020 m) of elevation.

=== Barrios ===
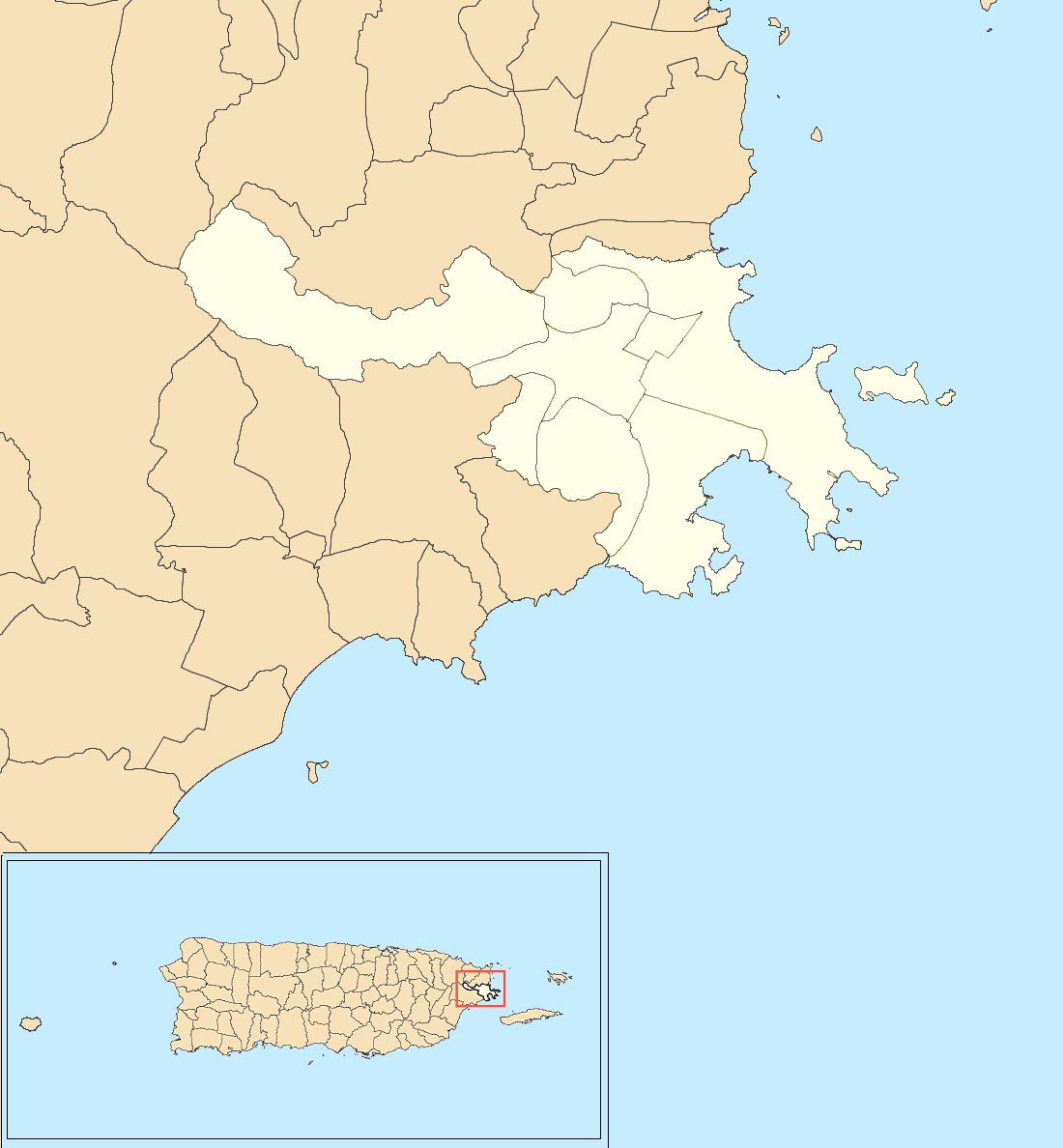
Subdivisions of Ceiba.

Like all municipalities of Puerto Rico, Ceiba is subdivided into barrios. The municipal buildings, central square and large Catholic church are located in a barrio referred to as "el pueblo", near the center of the municipality.

1. Ceiba barrio-pueblo
2. Chupacallos
3. Daguao
4. Guayacán
5. Machos
6. Quebrada Seca
7. Río Abajo
8. Saco

=== Sectors ===
Barrios (which are like minor civil divisions) in turn are further subdivided into smaller local populated place areas/units called sectores (sectors in English). The types of sectores may vary, from normally sector to urbanización to reparto to barriada to residencial, among others.

=== Special Communities ===
Comunidades Especiales de Puerto Rico (Special Communities of Puerto Rico) are marginalized communities whose citizens are experiencing a certain amount of social exclusion. A map shows these communities occur in nearly every municipality of the commonwealth. Of the 742 places that were on the list in 2014, the following barrios, communities, sectors, or neighborhoods were in Ceiba: Saco, Las Calderonas, Parcelas Aguas Claras, Parcelas Nuevas, Prado Hermoso, and Quebrada Seca.

=== Climate ===
Climate data for Ceiba, Puerto Rico (Roosevelt Roads Naval Station) 1991–2020 normals, extremes 1942–present
Month	Jan	Feb	Mar	Apr	May	Jun	Jul	Aug	Sep	Oct	Nov	Dec	Year
Record high °F (°C)	90 (32)	90 (32)	90 (32)	96 (36)	91 (33)	95 (35)	95 (35)	95 (35)	93 (34)	94 (34)	96 (36)	95 (35)	96 (36)
Mean daily maximum °F (°C)	82.9 (28.3)	83.5 (28.6)	84.2 (29.0)	85.9 (29.9)	86.7 (30.4)	88.1 (31.2)	88.8 (31.6)	89.1 (31.7)	88.8 (31.6)	88.3 (31.3)	86.2 (30.1)	84.1 (28.9)	86.4 (30.2)
Daily mean °F (°C)	77.2 (25.1)	77.5 (25.3)	78.1 (25.6)	79.6 (26.4)	81.1 (27.3)	82.7 (28.2)	83.0 (28.3)	83.4 (28.6)	82.6 (28.1)	82.0 (27.8)	80.4 (26.9)	78.4 (25.8)	80.5 (26.9)
Mean daily minimum °F (°C)	71.4 (21.9)	71.4 (21.9)	71.9 (22.2)	73.3 (22.9)	75.4 (24.1)	77.3 (25.2)	77.3 (25.2)	77.6 (25.3)	76.4 (24.7)	75.7 (24.3)	74.5 (23.6)	72.8 (22.7)	74.6 (23.7)
Record low °F (°C)	61 (16)	61 (16)	59 (15)	63 (17)	64 (18)	68 (20)	66 (19)	68 (20)	68 (20)	68 (20)	65 (18)	62 (17)	59 (15)
Average precipitation inches (mm)	2.62 (67)	1.97 (50)	1.84 (47)	2.99 (76)	6.71 (170)	3.90 (99)	4.31 (109)	4.32 (110)	6.40 (163)	5.75 (146)	6.07 (154)	3.99 (101)	50.87 (1,292)
Average precipitation days (≥ 0.01 in)	16.4	13.2	13.6	13.0	15.3	15.4	18.9	18.1	17.9	17.7	18.3	18.1	195.9
Source: NOAA

== Demographics ==
Historical population
Census	Pop.	Note	%±
1920	5,973		—
1930	7,275		21.8%
1940	7,021		−3.5%
1950	9,199		31.0%
1960	9,075		−1.3%
1970	10,312		13.6%
1980	14,944		44.9%
1990	17,145		14.7%
2000	18,004		5.0%
2010	13,631		−24.3%
2020	11,307		−17.0%
2025 (est.)	10,559	▼	−6.6%
U.S. Decennial Census 1920-1930; 1930-1950 1960-2000 2010 2020

== Tourism ==
To stimulate local tourism, the Puerto Rico Tourism Company launched the Voy Turisteando ("Going Tourist-ing") campaign, with a passport book and website. The Ceiba page lists Charco Frío y Las Tinajas, Playa Los Machos, the mangroves at Medio Mundo y Daguao, as places of interest.

=== Landmarks and places of interest ===
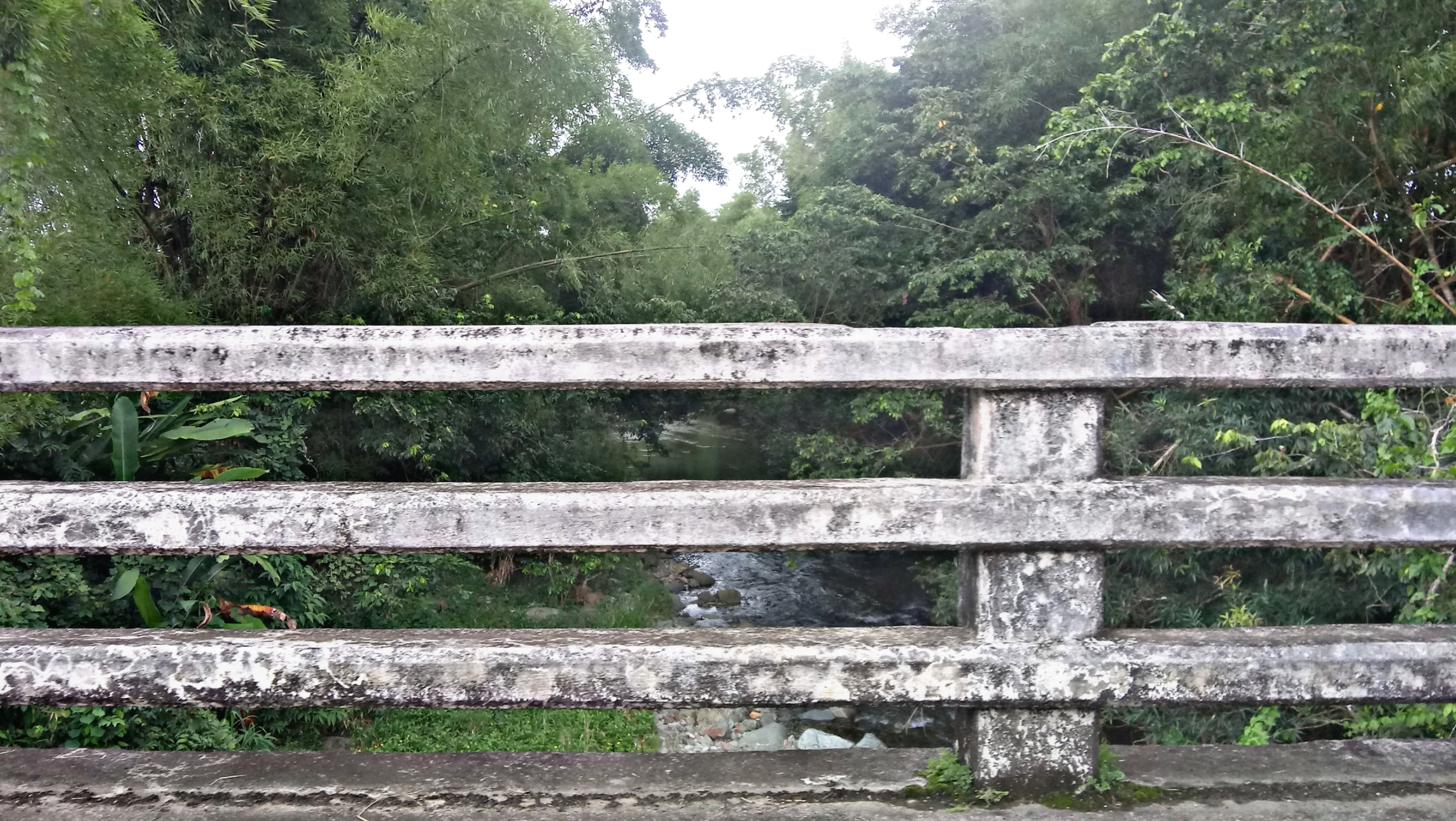
Bridge on PR-971 between Fajardo and Ceiba near Las Tinajas, Charco Frio and Hacienda Tinajas, tourist attractions just inside the eastern side of the El Yunque National Forest

According to a news article by Primera Hora, there are 60 beaches in Ceiba, including Los Machos Beach. Other places of interest include:

- Ceiba Historic Mural
- Ceiba State Forest
- Ensenada Honda
- Medio Mundo Beach
- Roosevelt Roads Base (United States Navy installation which was closed in 2004 and reactivated in 2025)
- The cellist Pablo Casals lived in Ceiba.

== Culture ==
=== Festivals and events ===
Ceiba celebrates its patron saint festival in June. The Fiestas Patronales de San Antonio de Padua is a religious and cultural celebration that generally features parades, games, artisans, amusement rides, regional food, and live entertainment. The festival has featured live performances by well-known artists such as Grupo Manía, and Domingo Quiñones.

Other festivals and events celebrated in Ceiba include:

- Maratón de los Enamorados - February
- Festival de Chiringas - March
- Festival de Marlin or Marlin Festival- May or June
- Fiesta Nacional de la Raza - October
- Maratón del Pavo - November

=== Sports ===
Former IBF world Jr. Middleweight boxing champion Carlos Santos hails from Ceiba. Ceiba also has an amateur AAA baseball team Los Marlins de Ceiba. Chi-Chi Rodriguez, Pro golfer is from Ceiba.

== Economy ==
Manufacturing (plywood, apparel, hardware products).

== Transportation ==
José Aponte de la Torre Airport offers commercial (mostly domestic) flights on three airlines; it also houses an MD-82 jet donated by American Airlines to local air mechanics students.

There are 29 bridges in Ceiba.

== Notable people ==
People who were born in, residents of, or otherwise closely associated with Ceiba include:

- Carlos Santos - former IBF Junior Middleweight Champion of the World.
- Luis Vigoreaux - radio and television show host, announcer, comedian and producer. Luis Vigoreaux was found murdered on January 17, 1983. His wife Lydia Echevarria arranged his murder.
- Domingo Quiñones - although born in Perth Amboy, New Jersey; Domingo Quiñones moved to Ceiba at the early age of 4 and lived there until the age of 14.
- Pablo Casals - built his home in Ceiba at the age of 80; the place was known as "El Pesebre".
- Rogelio Figueroa Garcia - was born in Naguabo, Puerto Rico; however, was raised in Parcelas Aguas Claras (Barrio El Corcho) in Ceiba. He is a Puerto Rican engineer, a politician, and the co-founder of the Puerto Ricans for Puerto Rico (PPR) political party.
- McJoe Arroyo - IBF Super Flyweight world boxing champion
- McWilliams Arroyo - professional boxer
- Jaron Brown - is a wide receiver for the Seattle Seahawks. He was born in Ceiba, PR.
- Isabel Rosado Morales - was born in Barrio Chupacallo in Ceiba, Puerto Rico. She was a founding member of La Sociedad Insular de Trabajadores Sociales, known today as Colegio de Trabajadores Sociales de Puerto Rico.
- Liver King - internet personality known for promoting an "ancestral lifestyle".

== Government ==
All municipalities in Puerto Rico are administered by a mayor, elected every four years. The current mayor of Ceiba is Samuel Rivera Báez, of the New Progressive Party (PNP). He was first elected at the 2020 general elections.

The city belongs to the Puerto Rico Senatorial district VIII, which is represented by two Senators. In 2024, Marissa Jiménez and Héctor Joaquín Sánchez Álvarez were elected as District Senators.

== Symbols ==
The municipio has an official flag and coat of arms.

=== Flag ===
Ceiba's flag derives its design and colors from the municipal coat of arms. This maintains the same symbolism given to the coat of arms. It is made of two vertical lines of the same width, red in the left side and green on the right. The red side depicts a yellow cross.

=== Coat of arms ===
The Ceiba coat of arms depicts a shield with a Ceiba tree. In the upper part of the shield is a red horizontal space with a golden cross in the middle and a golden fleur-de-lis on either side. The cross symbolizes the Christian faith as well recognizing Luis de la Cruz as Ceiba's founder. Around the shield are sugar cane stalks. Above the shield there is a golden Spanish fort.

== See also ==
- List of Puerto Ricans
- History of Puerto Rico
- Roosevelt Roads Naval Station
- Did you know-Puerto Rico?
