= Raffaele Sacco =

Italian optician and lyricist

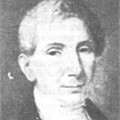
- Born: 14 August 1787
- Died: 20 January 1872

Raffaele Sacco (14 August 1787 – 20 January 1872) was an Italian optician and lyricist. He was the reputed inventor of the aletoscope, an apparatus to verify the authenticity of stamps, wax seals, etc.

Born in Naples, he was the author of the words to one of the best-known Neapolitan songs, "Te voglio bene assaje" (the music is by Gaetano Donizetti), the song that won the first Festival of Neapolitan Song in 1835.

== See also ==
- Music of Naples
