= Puerto Rico Highway 193 =

Highway in Puerto Rico

Highway 193
- Ruta 193

Route information
- Maintained by Puerto Rico DTPW
- Length: 2.4 km (1.5 mi)

Major junctions
- West end: PR-3 in Mata de Plátano
- East end: PR-3 / PR-992 in Luquillo barrio-pueblo

Location
- Country: United States
- Territory: Puerto Rico
- Municipalities: Luquillo

Highway system
- Roads in Puerto Rico; List
← PR-192	→ PR-194

Puerto Rico Highway 193 (PR-193) is a road located in Luquillo, Puerto Rico, passing through its downtown. This highway begins at PR-3 southeast of downtown Luquillo and returns again to PR-3 near Playa Fortuna.

== Major intersections ==
The entire route is located in Luquillo.

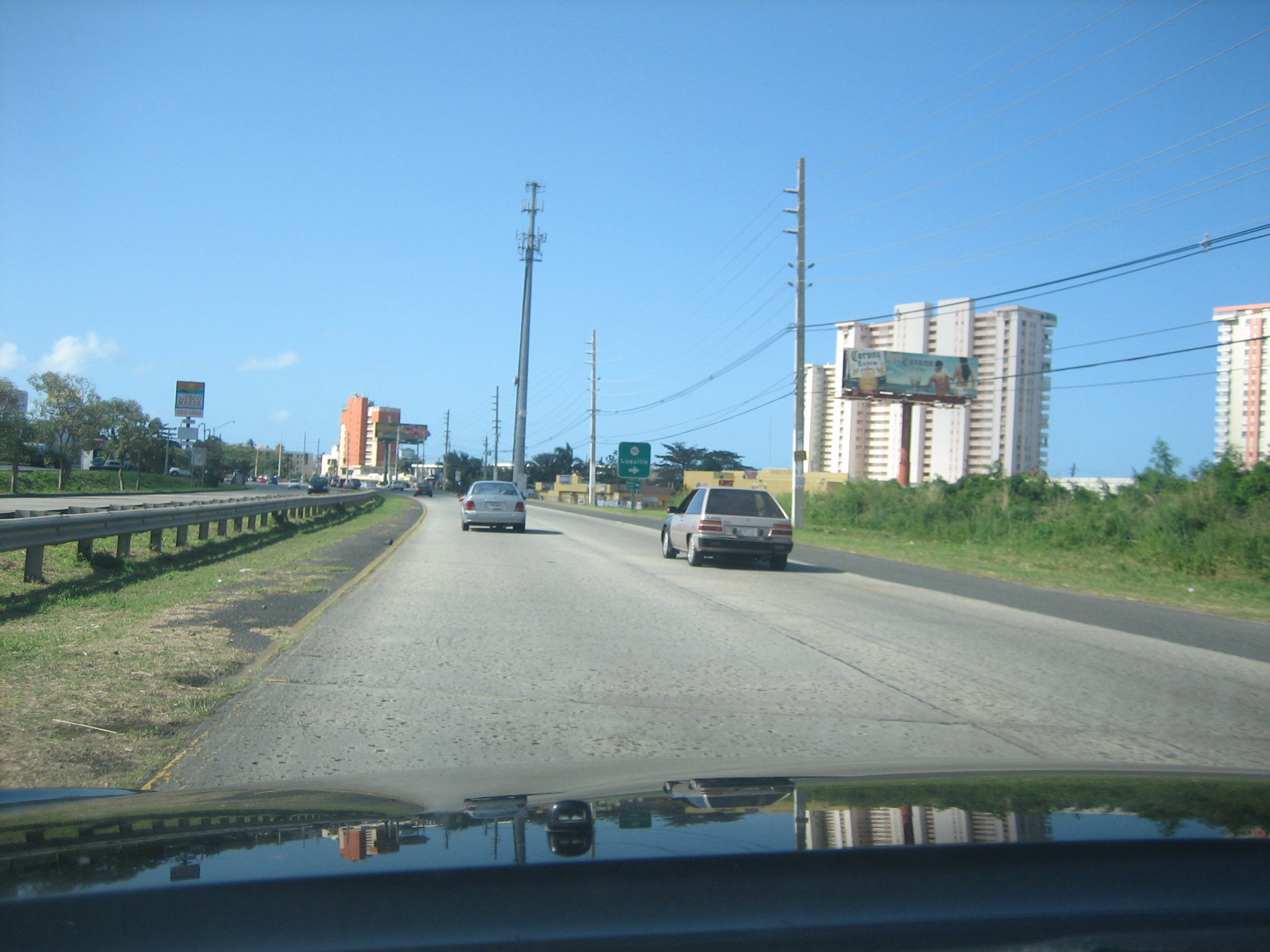
PR-3 west approaching PR-193 junction near downtown Luquillo

Location	km	mi	Destinations	Notes
Mata de Plátano	0.0	0.0	PR-3 – San Juan, Fajardo	Western terminus of PR-193; diamond interchange
Mata de Plátano	1.2– 1.3	0.75– 0.81	To PR-3 – Luquillo	
Luquillo barrio-pueblo	2.4	1.5	PR-3 / PR-992 – San Juan, Fajardo, Sabana	Eastern terminus of PR-193; diamond interchange
1.000 mi = 1.609 km; 1.000 km = 0.621 mi
