= Fajardo (disambiguation) =

Fajardo is a city in Puerto Rico.

Fajardo may also refer to:

== Places ==
- Fajardo metropolitan area, Puerto Rico
- Fajardo River, Puerto Rico
- Víctor Fajardo Province, Peru

== People ==
- Fajardo (surname), list of people with the surname

== Sports ==
- Fajardo FC, Puerto Rico
- Fajardo Cariduros, Puerto Rico
