= Pitahaya (disambiguation) =

Pitahaya is an alternative name for pitaya, a.k.a. dragon fruit.

Pitahaya may also refer to:

- Pitahaya dulce, a type of cacti
- Pitahaya, Luquillo, Puerto Rico, a barrio in Luquillo, Puerto Rico
- Pitahaya, Arroyo, Puerto Rico, a barrio in Arroyo, Puerto Rico
- Isla Pitahaya, Baja California Sur, an island in Bahía Concepción, Baja California Sur
- Pitahaya River, a river in Puerto Rico
- Pitahaya District, a district in Costa Rica
