= José González Ortiz =

Puerto Rican politician

Mayor of Luquillo
- In office January 14, 2001 – January 13, 2013
- Preceded by: Edna J. Figueroa Gómez
- Succeeded by: Jesús Márquez Rodríguez

Personal details
- Party: New Progressive Party (PNP)
- Occupation: Teacher, politician

José Manuel "Nelo" González Ortiz is a Puerto Rican politician and former mayor of Luquillo. González is affiliated with the New Progressive Party (PNP) and served as mayor from 2001 to 2013.

José Gonzalez Ortiz died on August 13, 2026. He was buried at the Sabana Municipal Cemetery in Luquillo, Puerto Rico.
