= Pitahaya River =

River of Puerto Rico

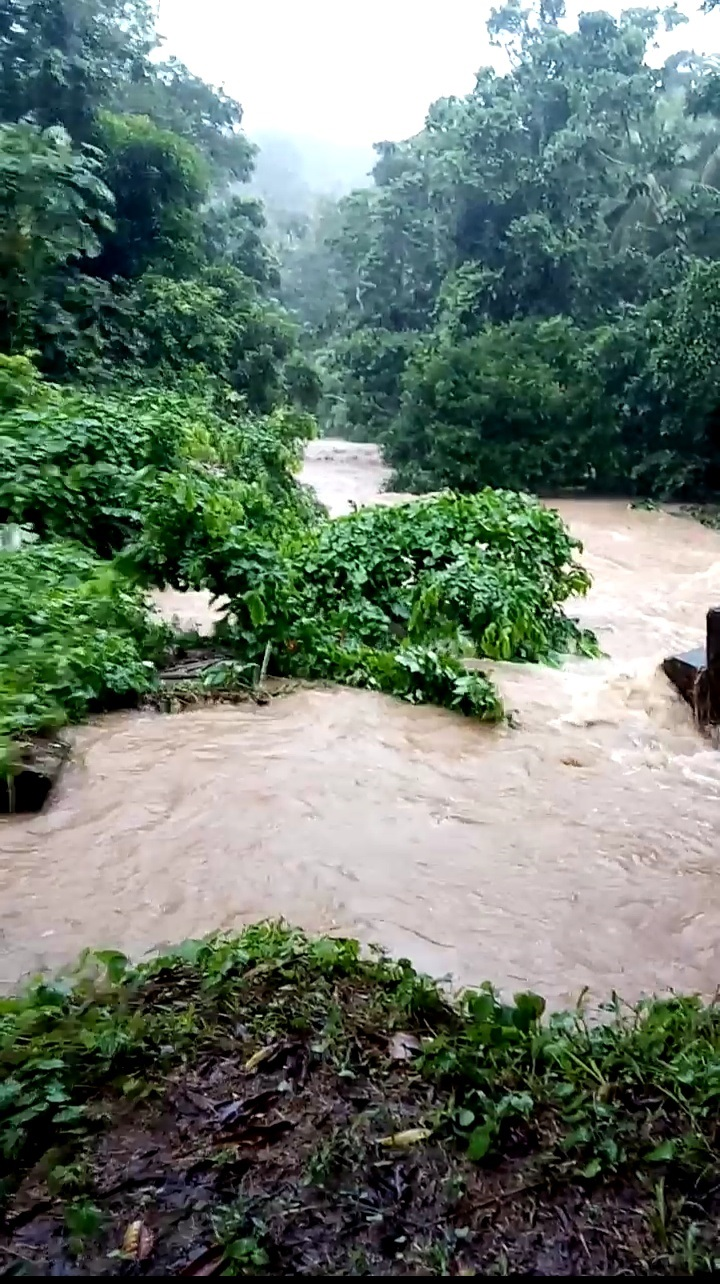
- Pitahaya River in the Casa Blanca sector after Hurricane Isaias in July 2020
- Native name: Río Pitahaya

Location
- Commonwealth: Puerto Rico
- Municipality: Luquillo

Physical characteristics
- Source
  - coordinates: 18.3721731°N 65.7107178°W

The Pitahaya is a river located in Pitahaya, a barrio of Luquillo, in Puerto Rico.

== See also ==
- List of rivers of Puerto Rico
