= Mameyes I =

Barrio of Luquillo, Puerto Rico

- Barrio
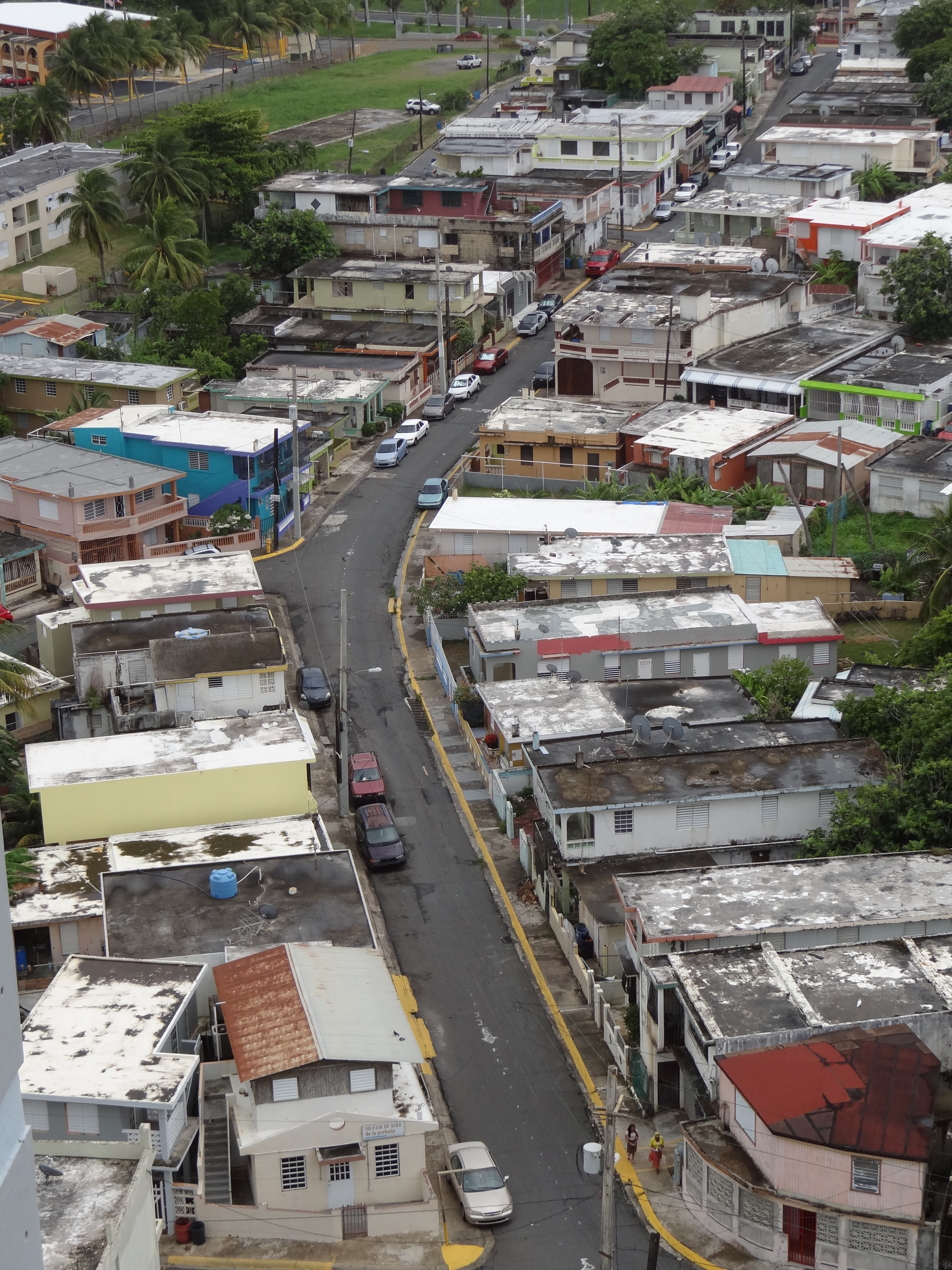
- Street and homes in Mameyes I

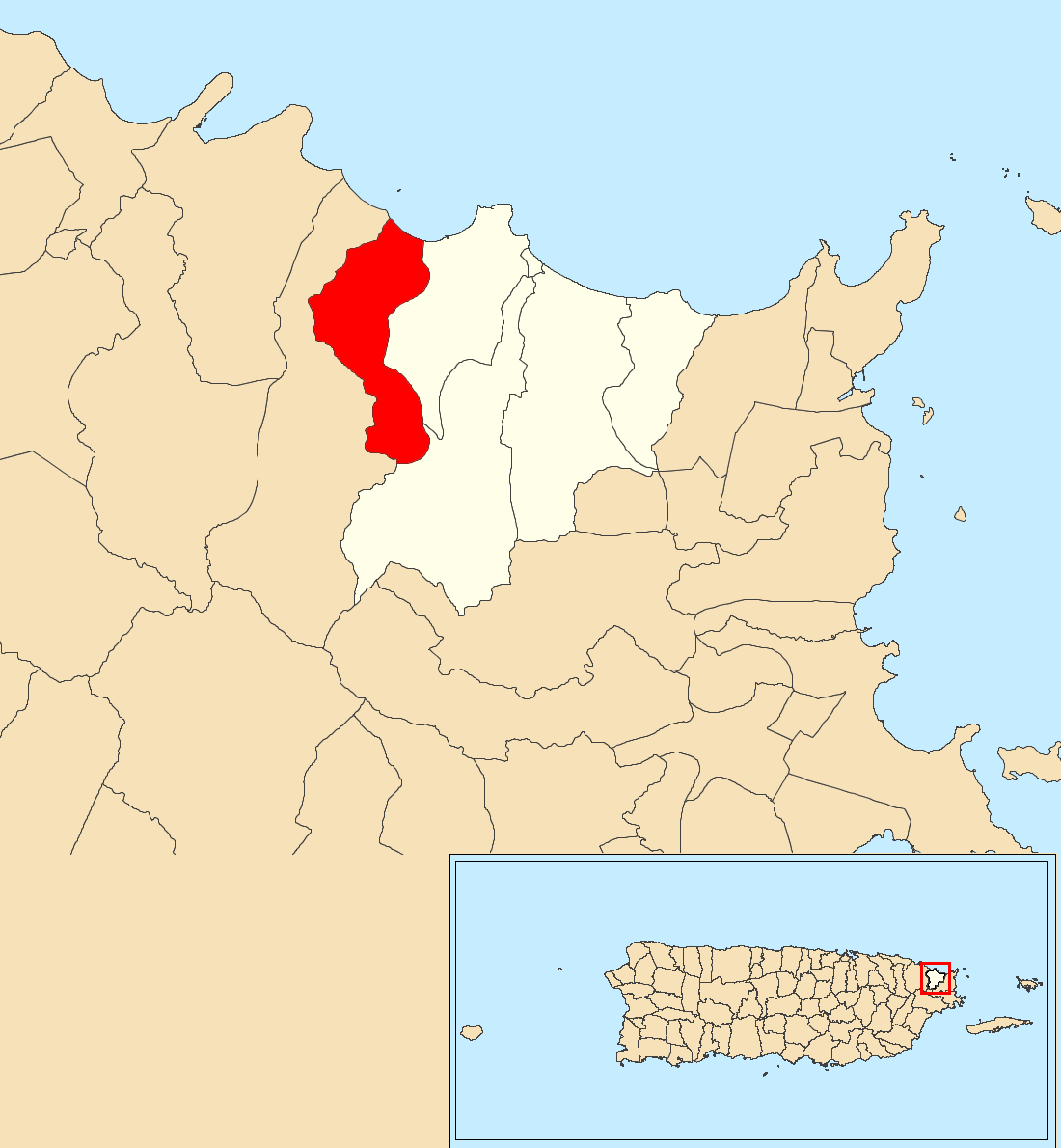
- Location of Mameyes I within the municipality of Luquillo shown in red

- Location of Puerto Rico
- Coordinates: 18°21′32″N 65°45′26″W
- Commonwealth: Puerto Rico
- Municipality: Luquillo

Area
  - Total: 4.12 sq mi (10.7 km^{2})
  - Land: 4.01 sq mi (10.4 km^{2})
  - Water: 0.11 sq mi (0.28 km^{2})
- Elevation: 128 ft (39 m)

Population (2010)
  - Total: 2,319
  - Density: 578.3/sq mi (223.3/km^{2})
- Source: 2010 Census
- Time zone: UTC−4 (AST)

Mameyes I is a barrio in the municipality of Luquillo, Puerto Rico. Its population in 2010 was 2,319.

Historical population
Census	Pop.	Note	%±
1910	1,008		—
1920	1,100		9.1%
1930	1,421		29.2%
1940	1,293		−9.0%
1950	1,688		30.5%
1960	1,435		−15.0%
1970	1,876		30.7%
1980	2,648		41.2%
1990	2,592		−2.1%
2000	2,383		−8.1%
2010	2,319		−2.7%
U.S. Decennial Census; 1899 (shown as 1900) 1910-1930; 1930-1950 1980-2000 2010

== Gallery ==
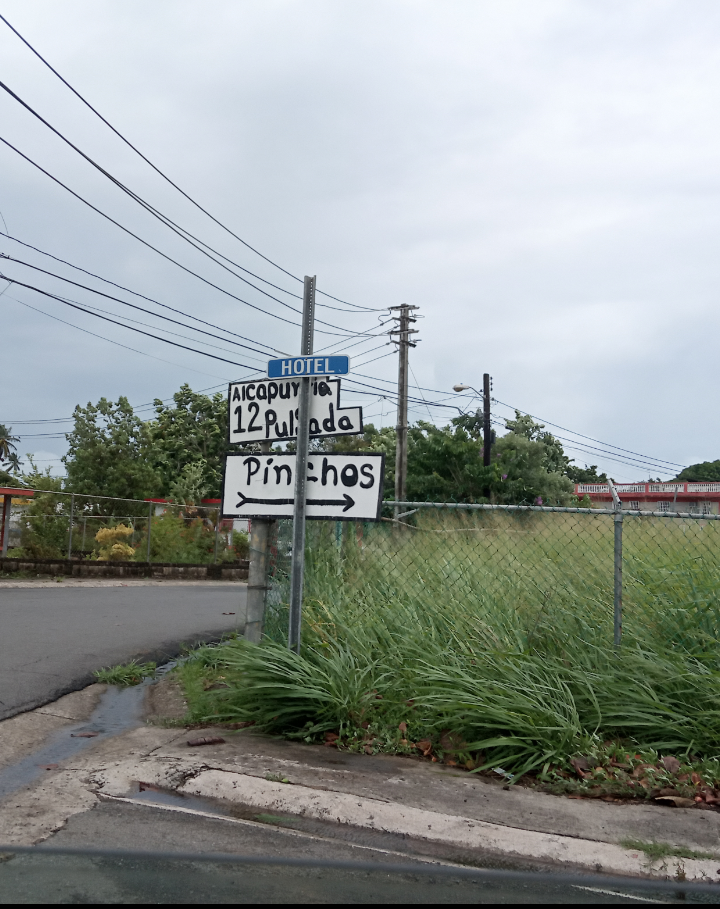
Sign for pinchos and alcapurrias, local food, for sale in Parcelas Fortuna in Mameyes I

== See also ==
- List of communities in Puerto Rico
