= Jesús Márquez Rodríguez =

Puerto Rican politician

Mayor of Luquillo
- Incumbent
- Assumed office January 14, 2013
- Preceded by: José González Ortiz

Personal details
- Born: August 28, 1966 (age 60) Luquillo, Puerto Rico
- Party: Popular Democratic Party (PPD)
- Spouse: Ana Marie Rodríguez Colón
- Education: University of Puerto Rico (BS); Interamerican University of Puerto Rico School of Law (JD)

Jesús Márquez Rodríguez (born 28 August 1966) is a Puerto Rican politician and the current mayor of Luquillo. Márquez is affiliated with the Popular Democratic Party (PPD) and has served as mayor since 2013.

Graduated from Isidro A. Sánchez High School in Luquillo Class of 1984. He has a bachelor's degree in Political Science and studies in Labor Relations from the University of Puerto Rico. In 2002, he studied International Law at the Ortega y Gasset Foundation in Toledo, Spain. Later, he earned a Juris Doctor from the Interamerican University of Puerto Rico School of Law and did his legal internship at the university's Legal Assistance Clinic.
