= Juan Martín, Luquillo, Puerto Rico =

Barrio of Puerto Rico

Juan Martín
- Barrio
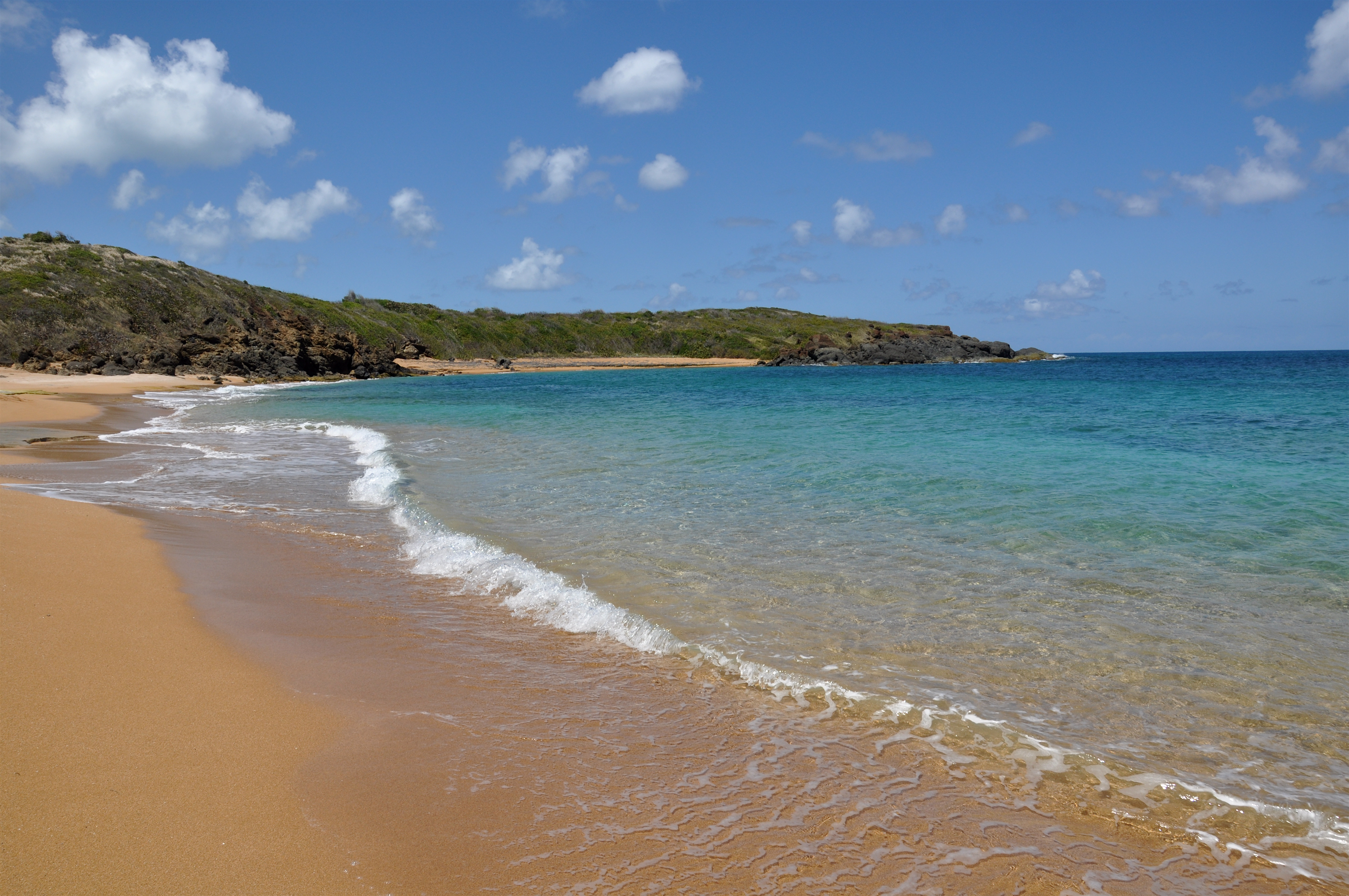
- Beach at Juan Martín

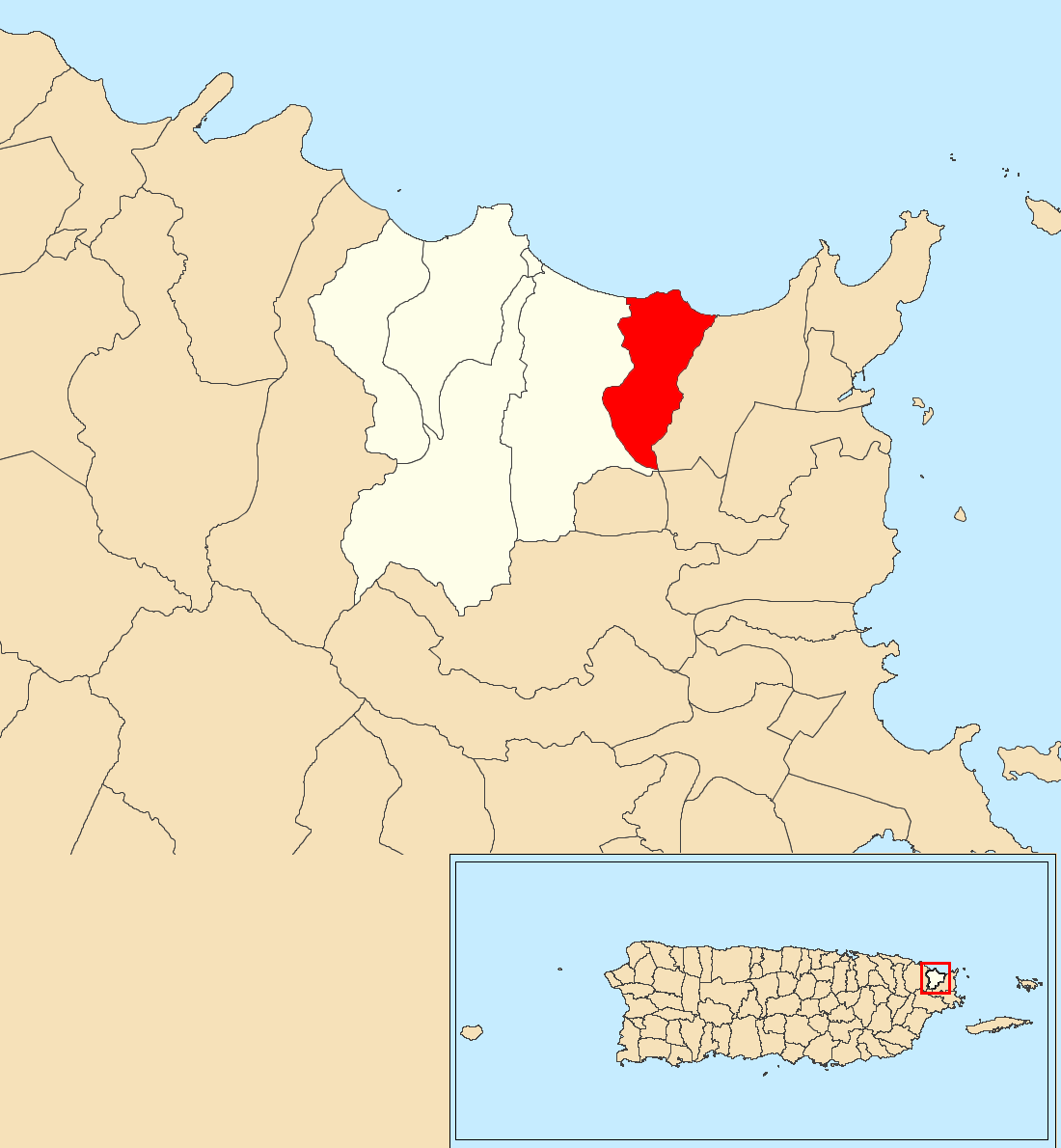
- Location of Juan Martín within the municipality of Luquillo shown in red

- Location of Puerto Rico
- Coordinates: 18°21′06″N 65°41′04″W
- Commonwealth: Puerto Rico
- Municipality: Luquillo

Area
  - Total: 3.22 sq mi (8.3 km^{2})
  - Land: 2.83 sq mi (7.3 km^{2})
  - Water: 0.39 sq mi (1.0 km^{2})
- Elevation: 72 ft (22 m)

Population (2010)
  - Total: 874
  - Density: 308.8/sq mi (119.2/km^{2})
- Source: 2010 Census
- Time zone: UTC−4 (AST)

Juan Martín is a barrio in the municipality of Luquillo, Puerto Rico. Its population in 2010 was 874.

== History ==
Juan Martín was in Spain's gazetteers until Puerto Rico was ceded by Spain in the aftermath of the Spanish–American War under the terms of the Treaty of Paris of 1898 and became an unincorporated territory of the United States. In 1899, the United States Department of War conducted a census of Puerto Rico finding that the combined population of Juan Martín and Sabana barrios was 1,029.

Historical population
Census	Pop.	Note	%±
1910	804		—
1920	1,100		36.8%
1930	1,172		6.5%
1940	1,157		−1.3%
1950	921		−20.4%
1960	625		−32.1%
1970	903		44.5%
1980	1,032		14.3%
1990	943		−8.6%
2000	966		2.4%
2010	874		−9.5%
U.S. Decennial Census; 1900 (N/A) 1910-1930; 1930-1950 1980-2000 2010

== Gallery ==
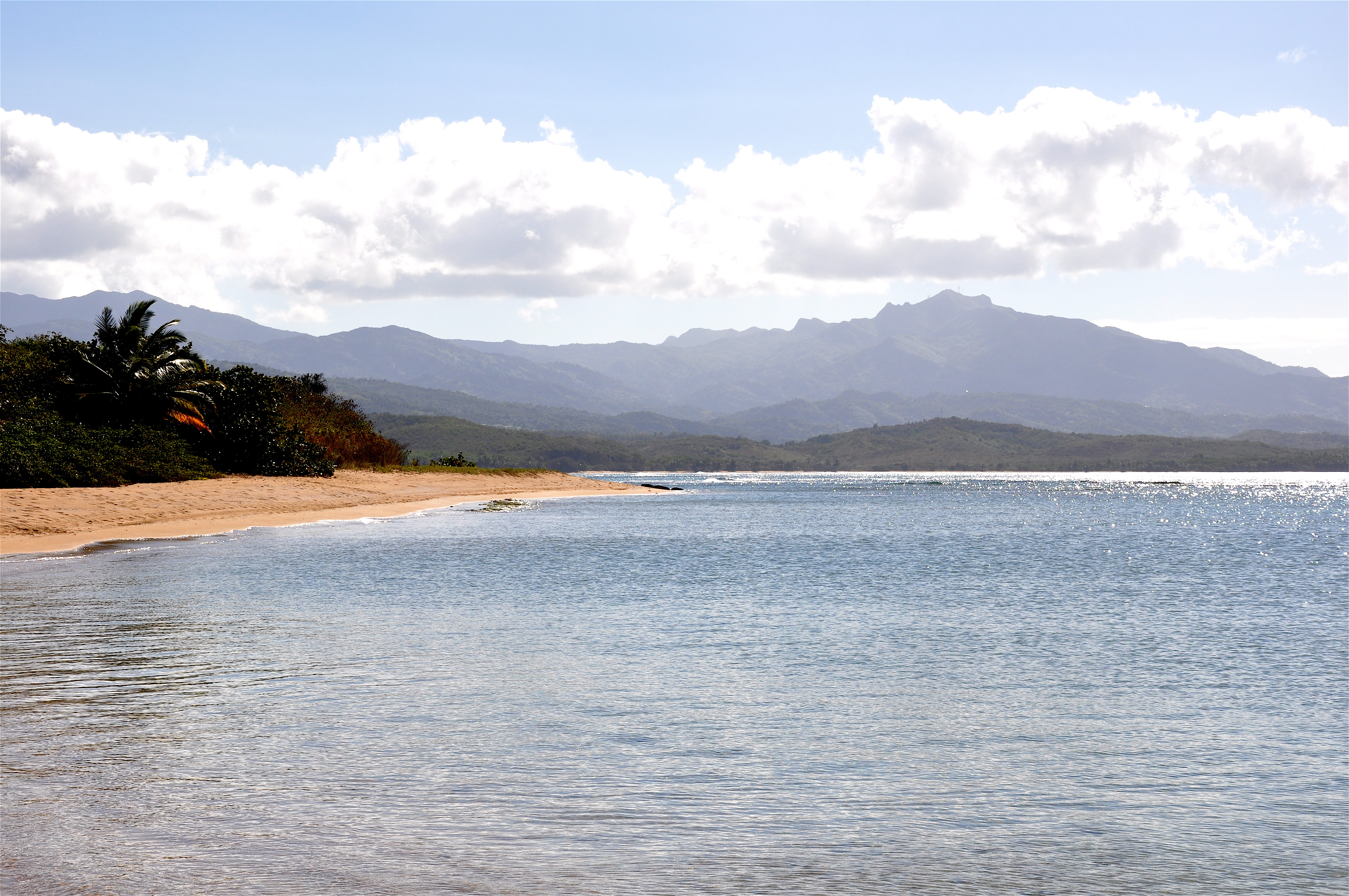
View from Beach at Juan Martín

== See also ==
- List of communities in Puerto Rico
