= Sabana, Luquillo, Puerto Rico =

Barrio of Puerto Rico

Sabana
- Barrio
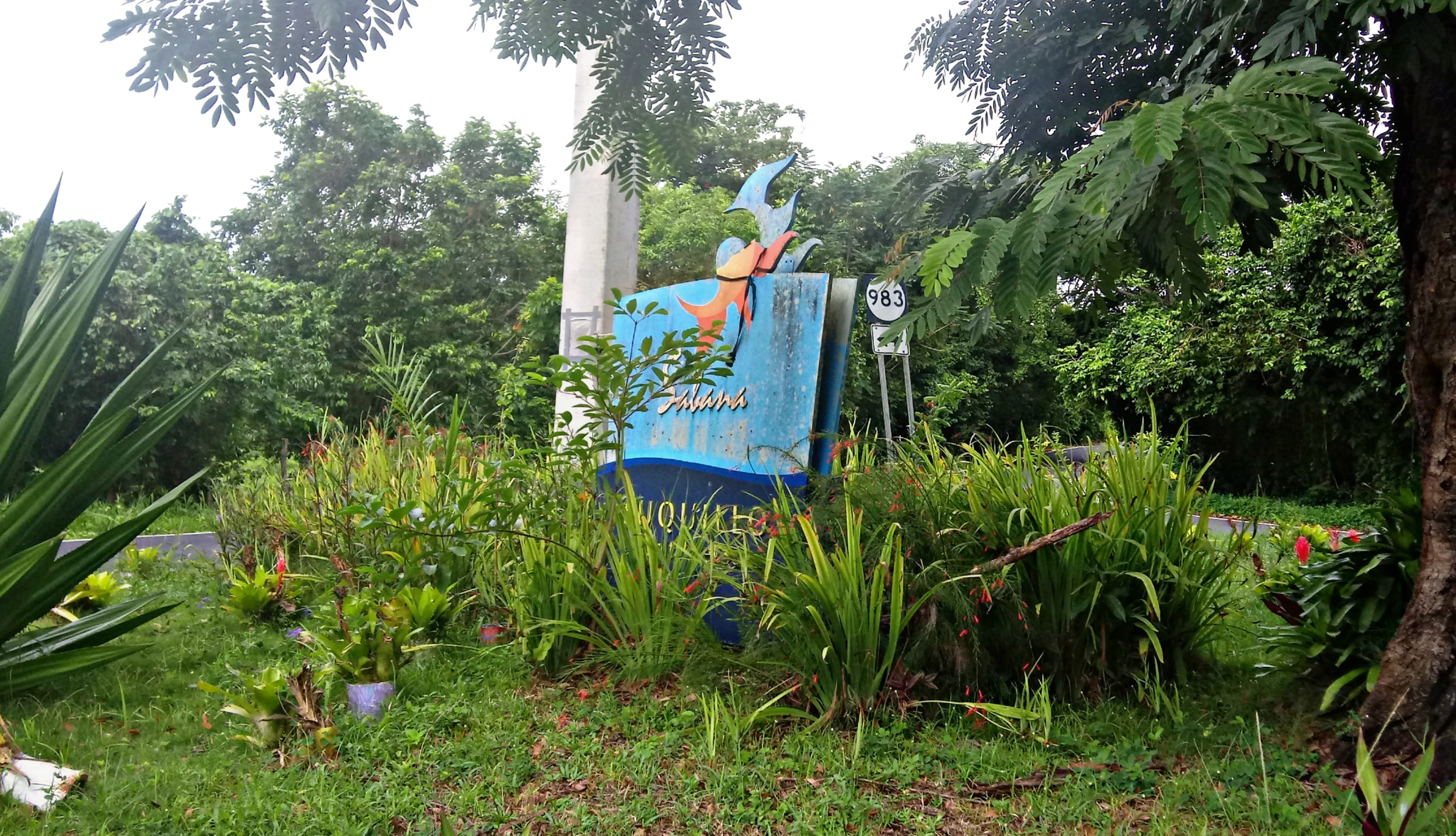
- Sign at entrance of Sabana barrio

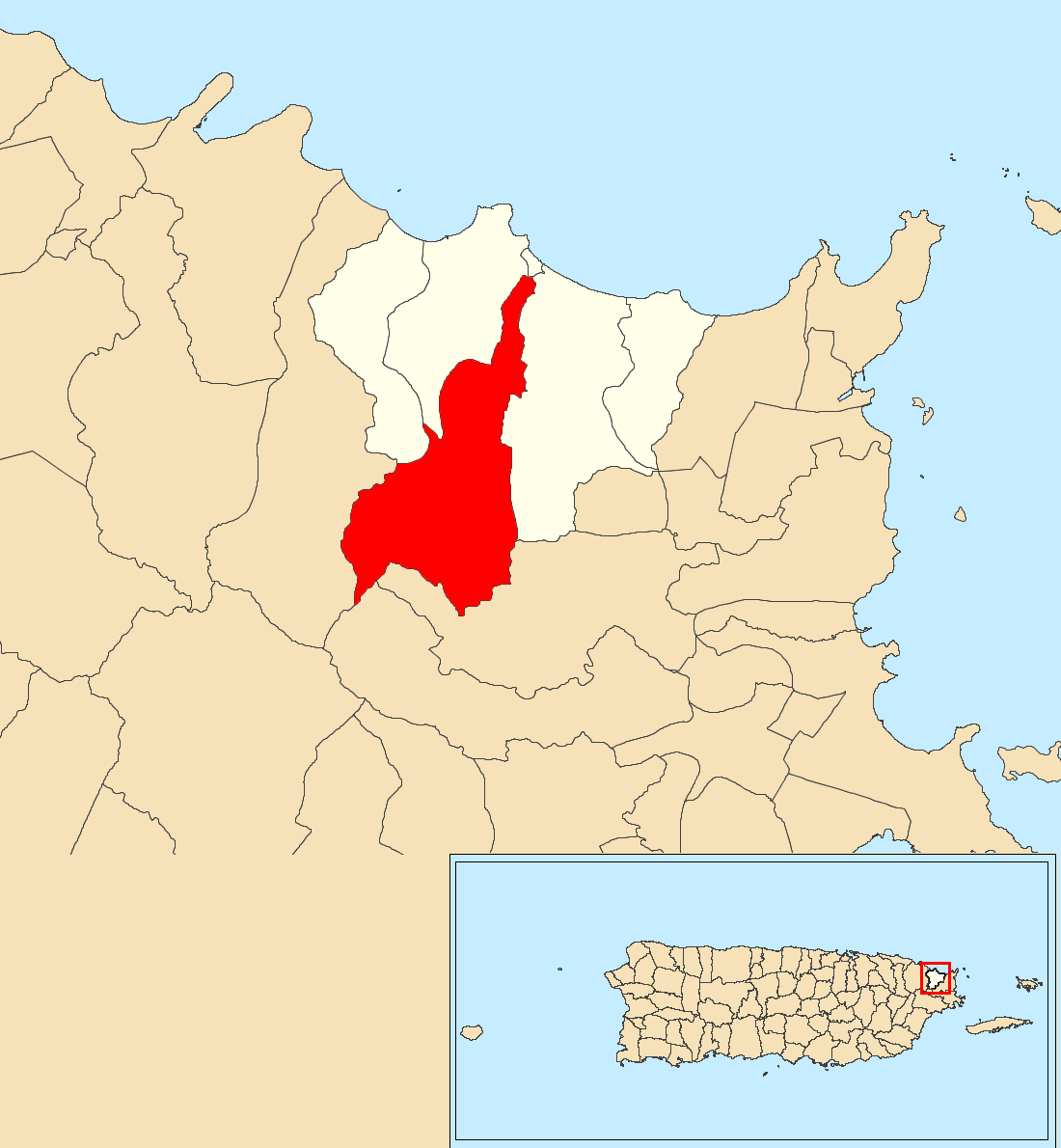
- Location of Sabana within the municipality of Luquillo shown in red

- Location of Puerto Rico
- Coordinates: 18°18′31″N 65°44′20″W
- Commonwealth: Puerto Rico
- Municipality: Luquillo

Area
  - Total: 7.77 sq mi (20.1 km^{2})
  - Land: 7.76 sq mi (20.1 km^{2})
  - Water: 0.01 sq mi (0.026 km^{2})
- Elevation: 705 ft (215 m)

Population (2010)
  - Total: 2,352
  - Density: 303.1/sq mi (117.0/km^{2})
- Source: 2010 Census
- Time zone: UTC−4 (AST)

Sabana is a barrio in the municipality of Luquillo, Puerto Rico. Its population in 2010 was 2,352.

== History ==
Sabana was in Spain's gazetteers until Puerto Rico was ceded by Spain in the aftermath of the Spanish–American War under the terms of the Treaty of Paris of 1898 and became an unincorporated territory of the United States. In 1899, the United States Department of War conducted a census of Puerto Rico finding that the combined population of Sabana and Juan Martín barrios was 1,029.

Historical population
Census	Pop.	Note	%±
1910	509		—
1920	611		20.0%
1930	1,242		103.3%
1940	2,045		64.7%
1950	1,474		−27.9%
1960	968		−34.3%
1970	0		−100.0%
1980	1,350		—
1990	2,448		81.3%
2000	2,292		−6.4%
2010	2,352		2.6%
U.S. Decennial Census; 1900 (N/A) 1910-1930; 1930-1950 1980-2000 2010

== Gallery ==
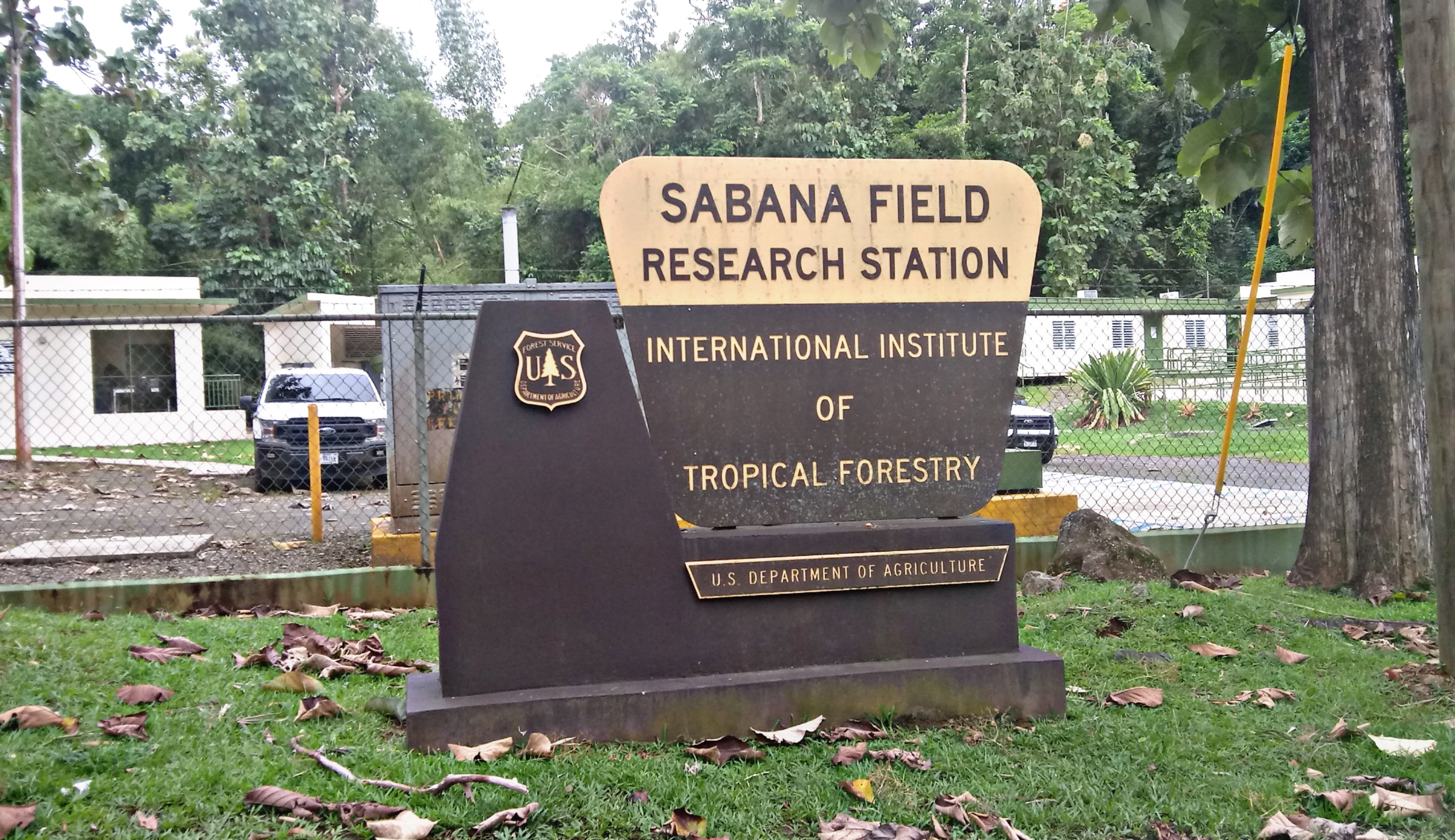
Sabana Field Research Station is an entrance into the El Yunque National Forest

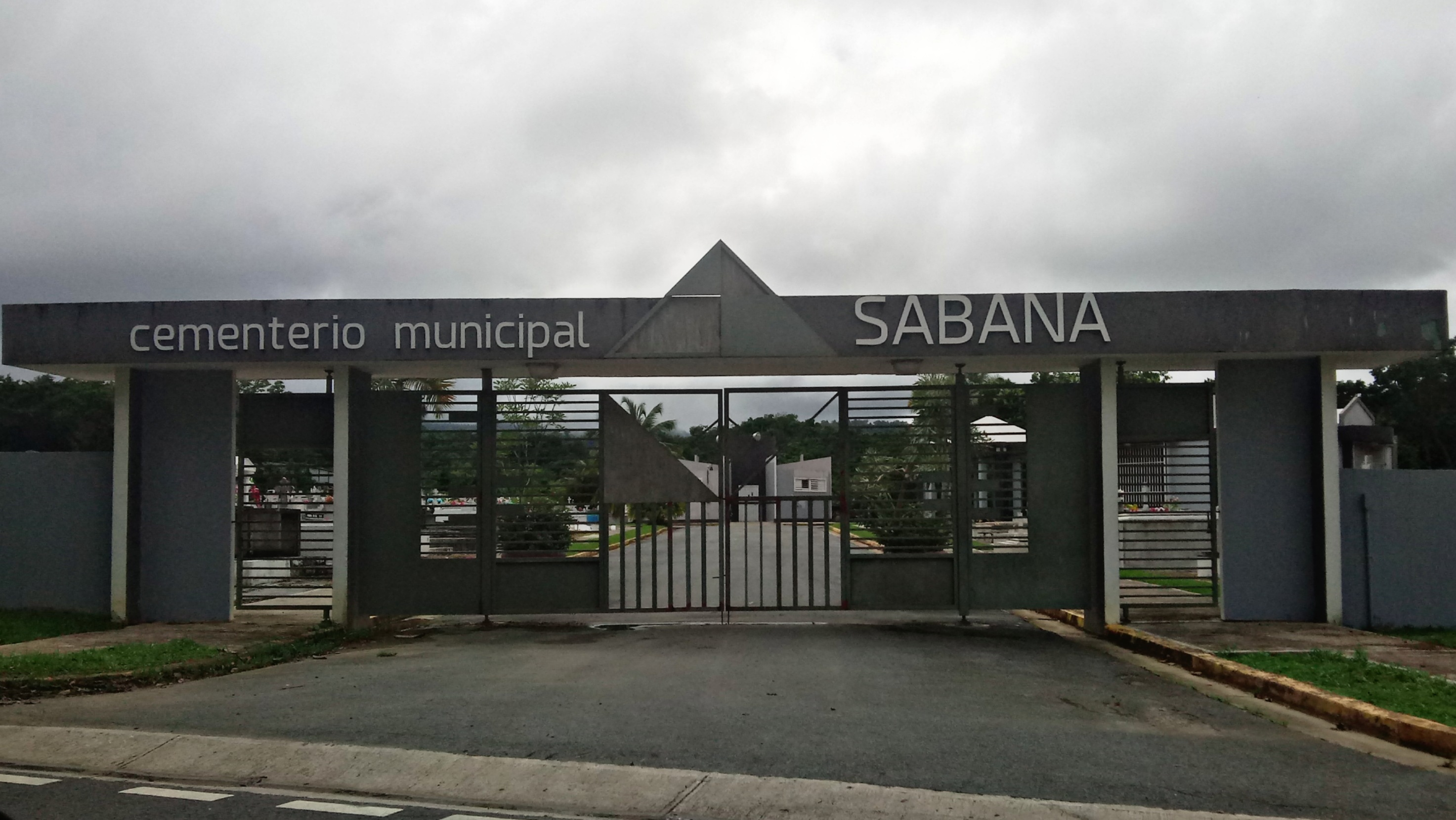
Cemetery in Sabana barrio

== See also ==
- List of communities in Puerto Rico
