= Fajardo metropolitan area =

Census area in Puerto Rico

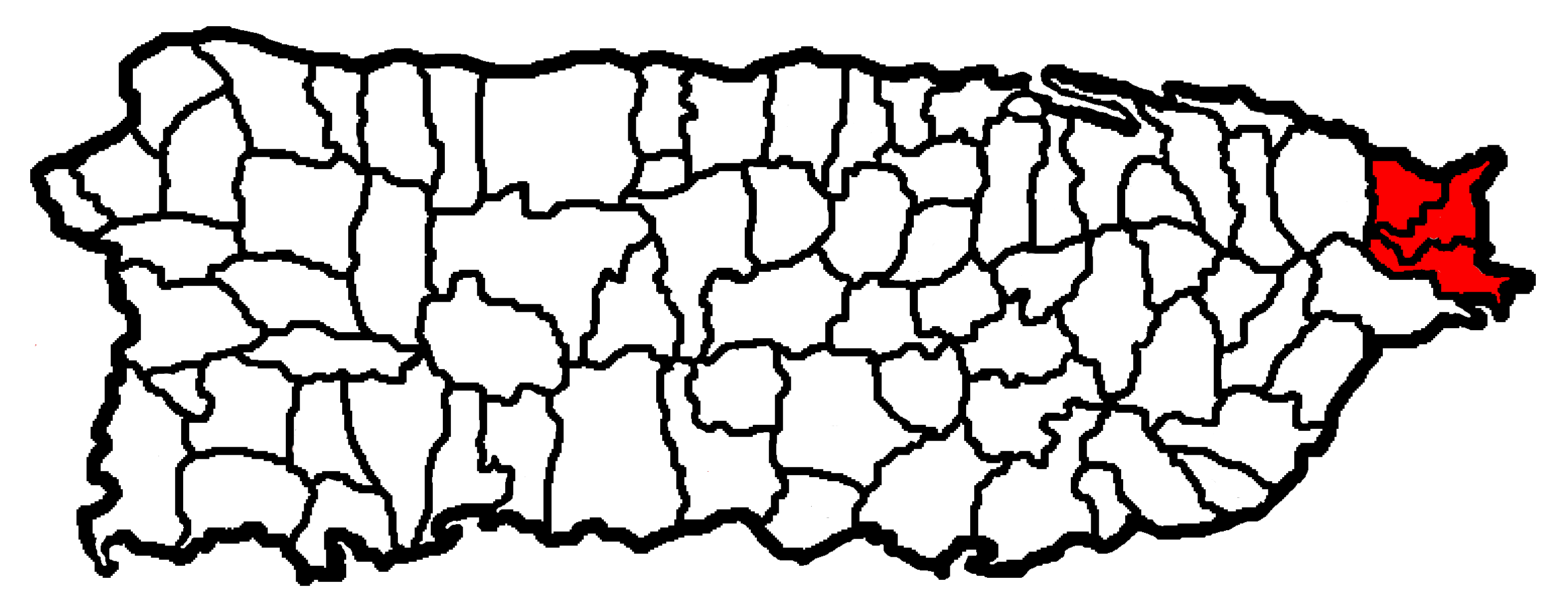
Map of Puerto Rico highlighting the Fajardo Metropolitan Statistical Area.

The Fajardo Metropolitan Statistical Area was a United States Census Bureau defined Metropolitan Statistical Area (MSA) in northeastern Puerto Rico. A July 1, 2009 Census Bureau estimate placed the population at 80,707, a 2.77% increase over the 2000 census figure of 78,533.

The Fajardo metropolitan area was the smallest metropolitan area (by population) in Puerto Rico. Prior to the 2020 United States census, its MSA status was dissolved. In 2023, its constituent municipalities were added to the San Juan–Bayamón–Caguas metropolitan statistical area.

== Municipalities ==
A total of three municipalities (Spanish: municipios) were included as part of the Fajardo Metropolitan Statistical Area.

- Fajardo (Principal City) Pop: 32,124
- Luquillo Pop: 17,781
- Ceiba Pop: 11,307

== Combined Statistical Area ==
The Fajardo Metropolitan Statistical Area was a component of the San Juan–Caguas–Fajardo Combined Statistical Area.

== See also ==
- Puerto Rico census statistical areas
