= Mata de Plátano =

Barrio of Luquillo, Puerto Rico

- Barrio
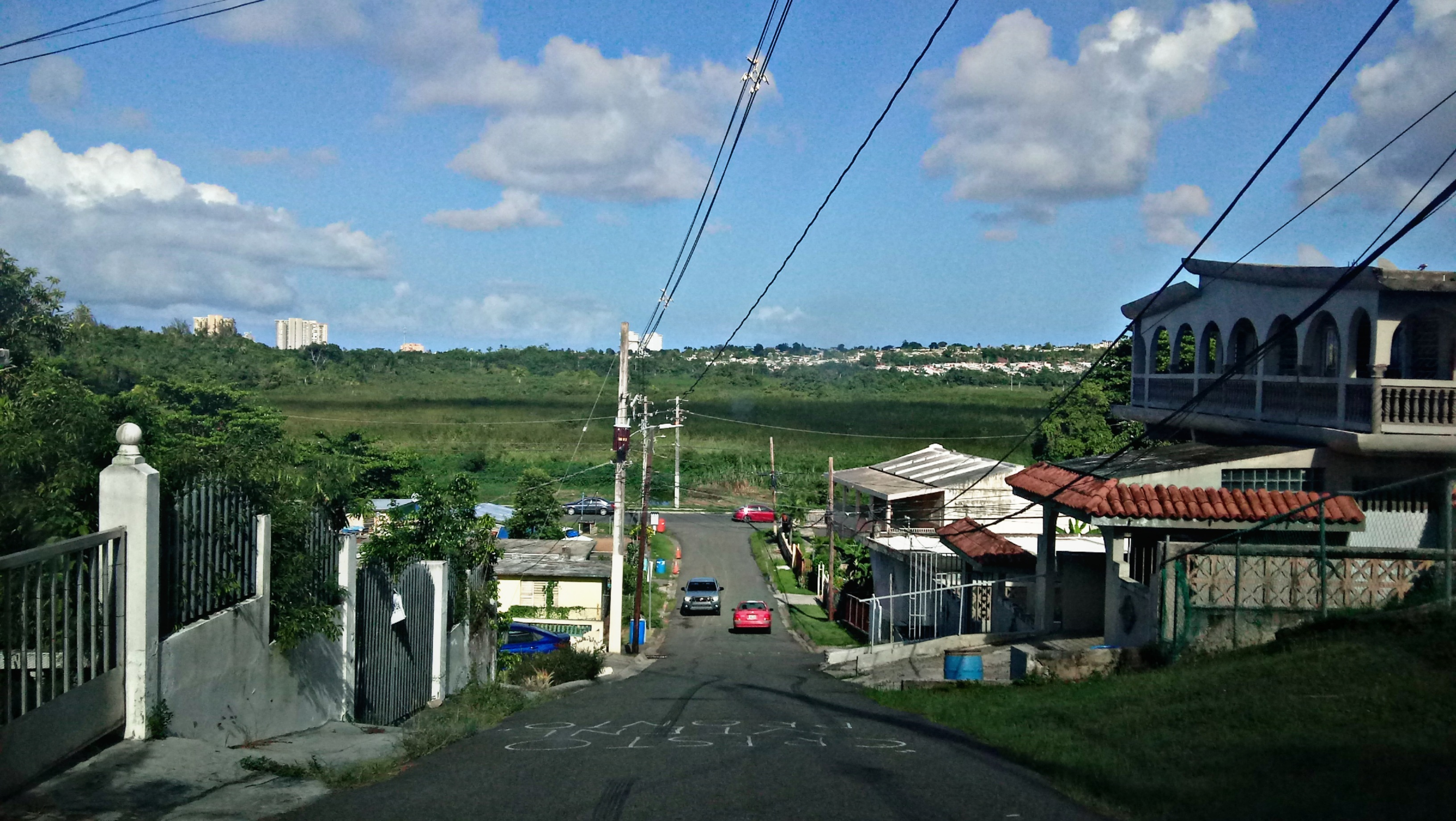
- Main road in Mata de Plátano

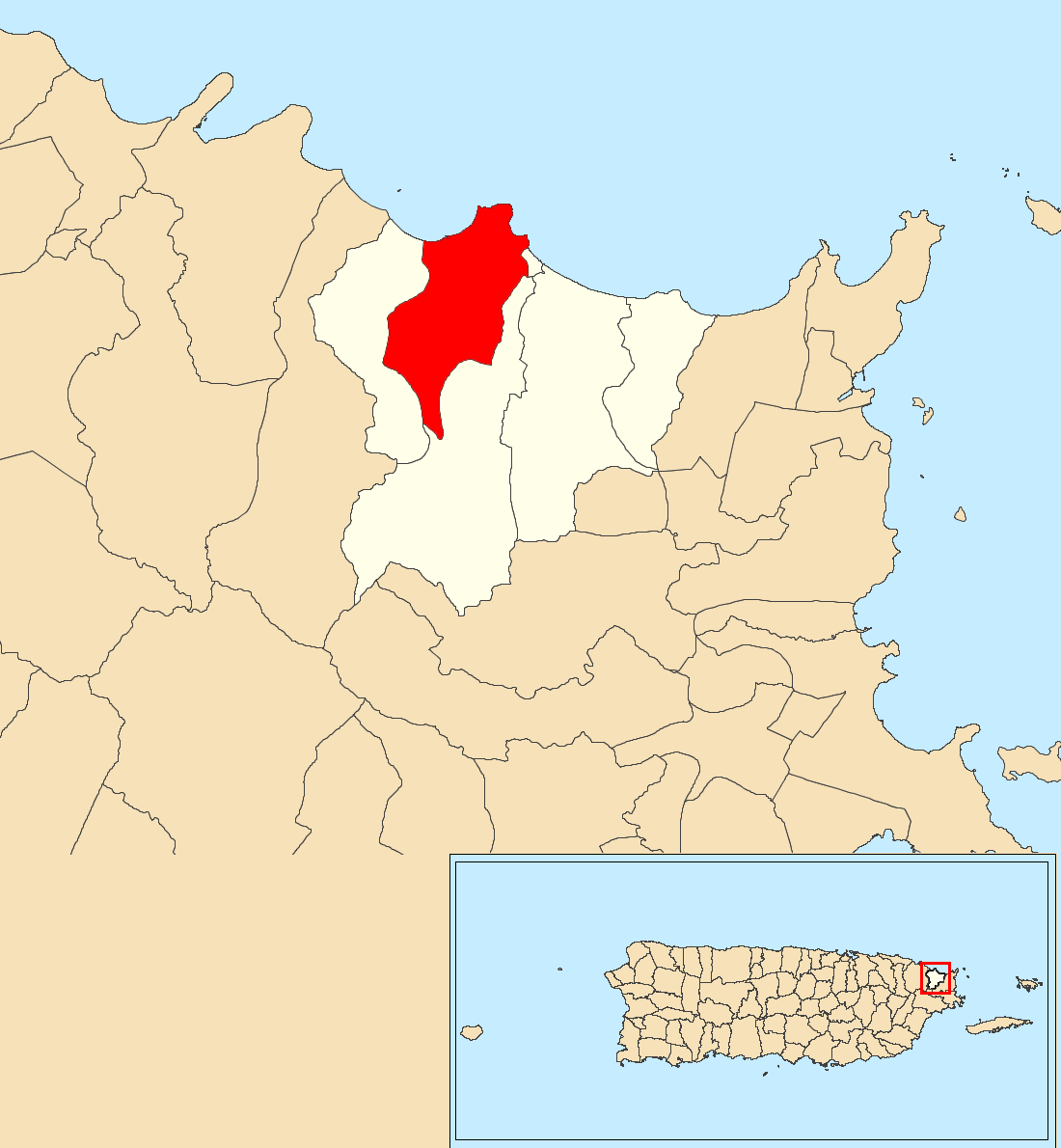
- Location of Mata de Plátano within the municipality of Luquillo shown in red

- Location of Puerto Rico
- Coordinates: 18°22′01″N 65°44′14″W
- Commonwealth: Puerto Rico
- Municipality: Luquillo

Area
  - Total: 5.19 sq mi (13.4 km^{2})
  - Land: 4.49 sq mi (11.6 km^{2})
  - Water: 0.70 sq mi (1.8 km^{2})
- Elevation: 20 ft (6.1 m)

Population (2010)
  - Total: 8,972
  - Density: 1,998.2/sq mi (771.5/km^{2})
- Source: 2010 Census
- Time zone: UTC−4 (AST)

Mata de Plátano is a barrio in the municipality of Luquillo, Puerto Rico. Its population in 2010 was 8,972.

Historical population
Census	Pop.	Note	%±
1910	824		—
1920	897		8.9%
1930	573		−36.1%
1940	885		54.5%
1950	1,036		17.1%
1960	1,033		−0.3%
1970	0		−100.0%
1980	5,447		—
1990	6,783		24.5%
2000	8,318		22.6%
2010	8,972		7.9%
U.S. Decennial Census; 1899 (shown as 1900) 1910-1930; 1930-1950 1980-2000 2010

== Gallery ==
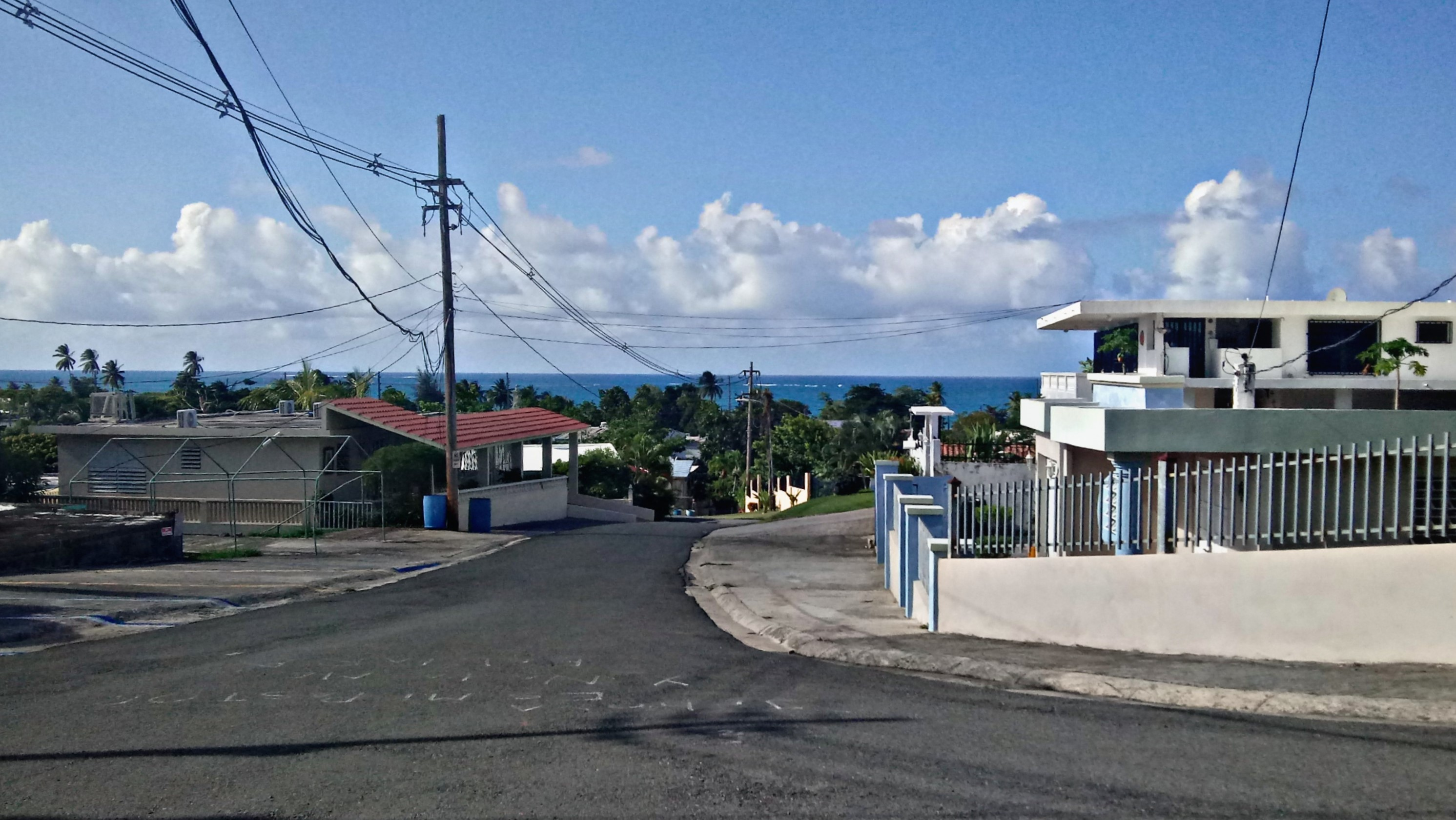
Mata de Plátano barrio street and ocean view

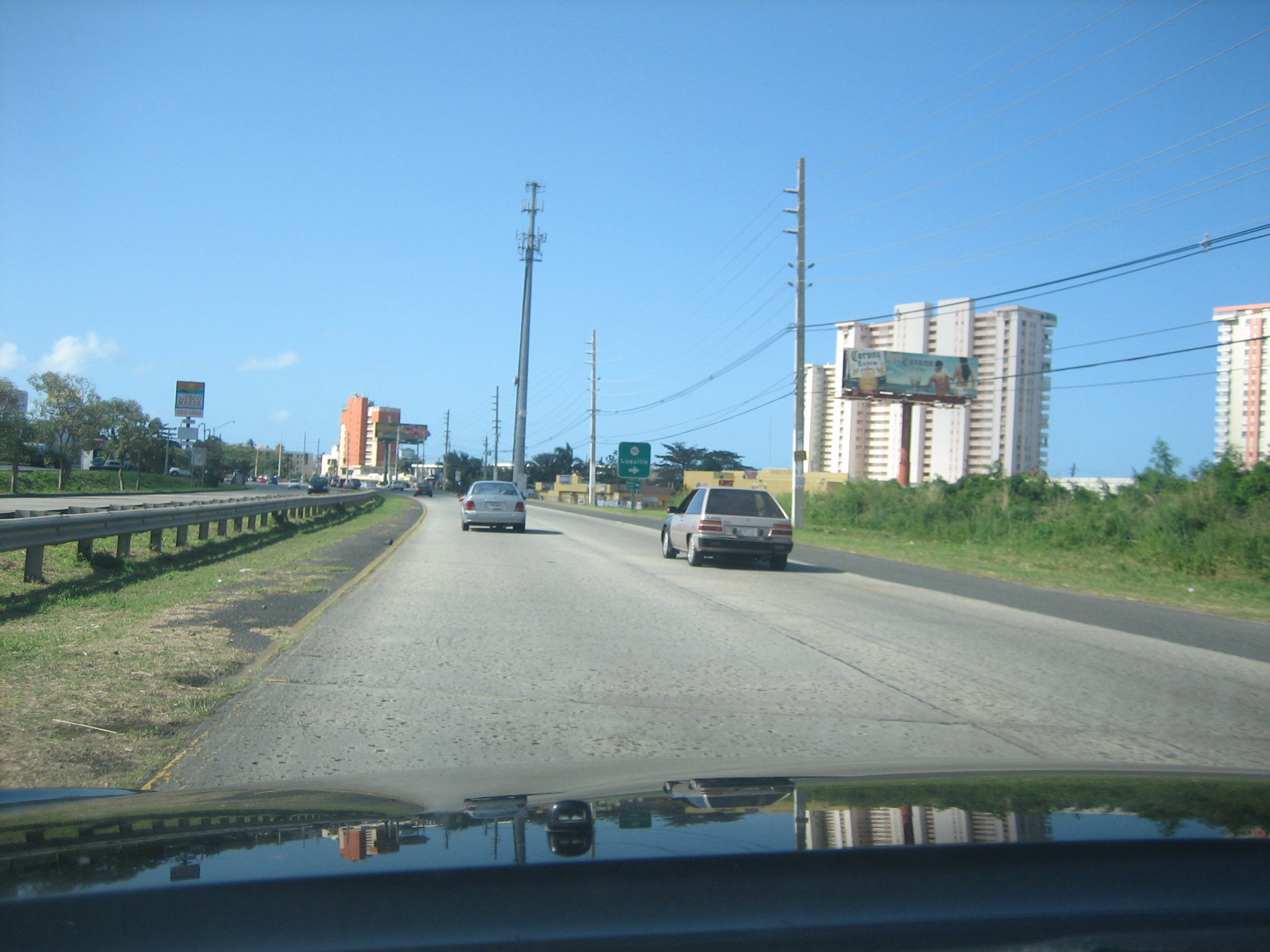
Puerto Rico Highway 3 in Mata de Plátano

== See also ==
- List of communities in Puerto Rico
