= Luquillo barrio-pueblo =

Historical and administrative center (seat) of Luquillo, Puerto Rico

Luquillo barrio-pueblo Pueblo de Luquillo
- Municipality Seat
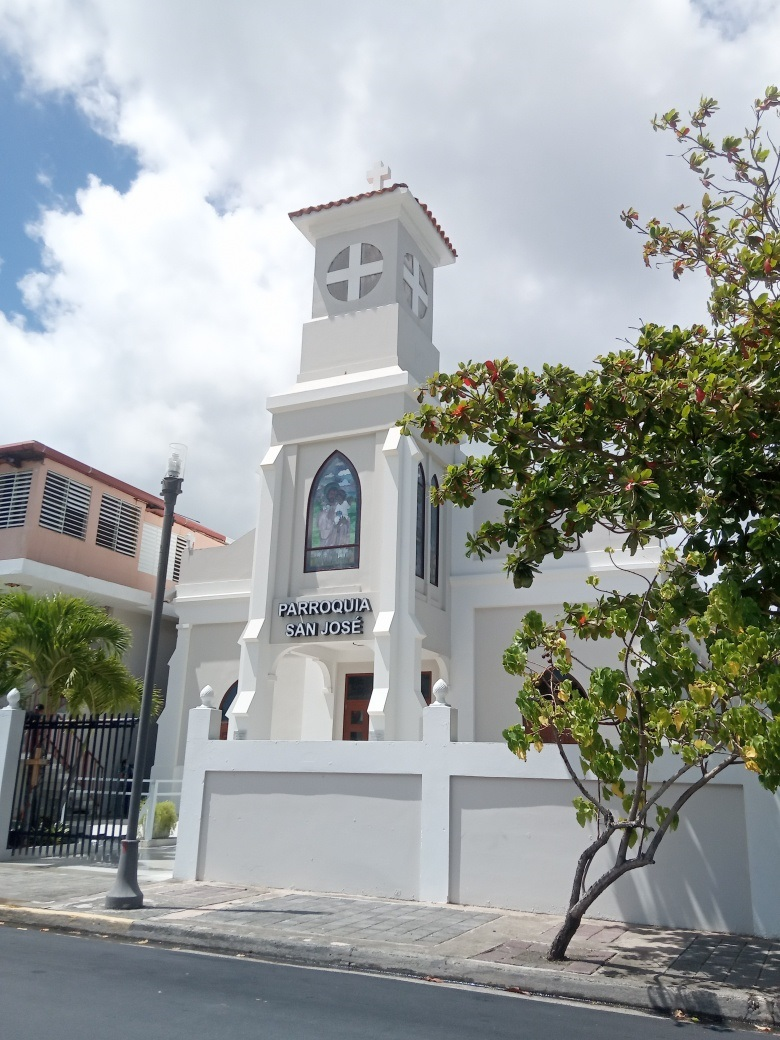
- San Jose Parish Church

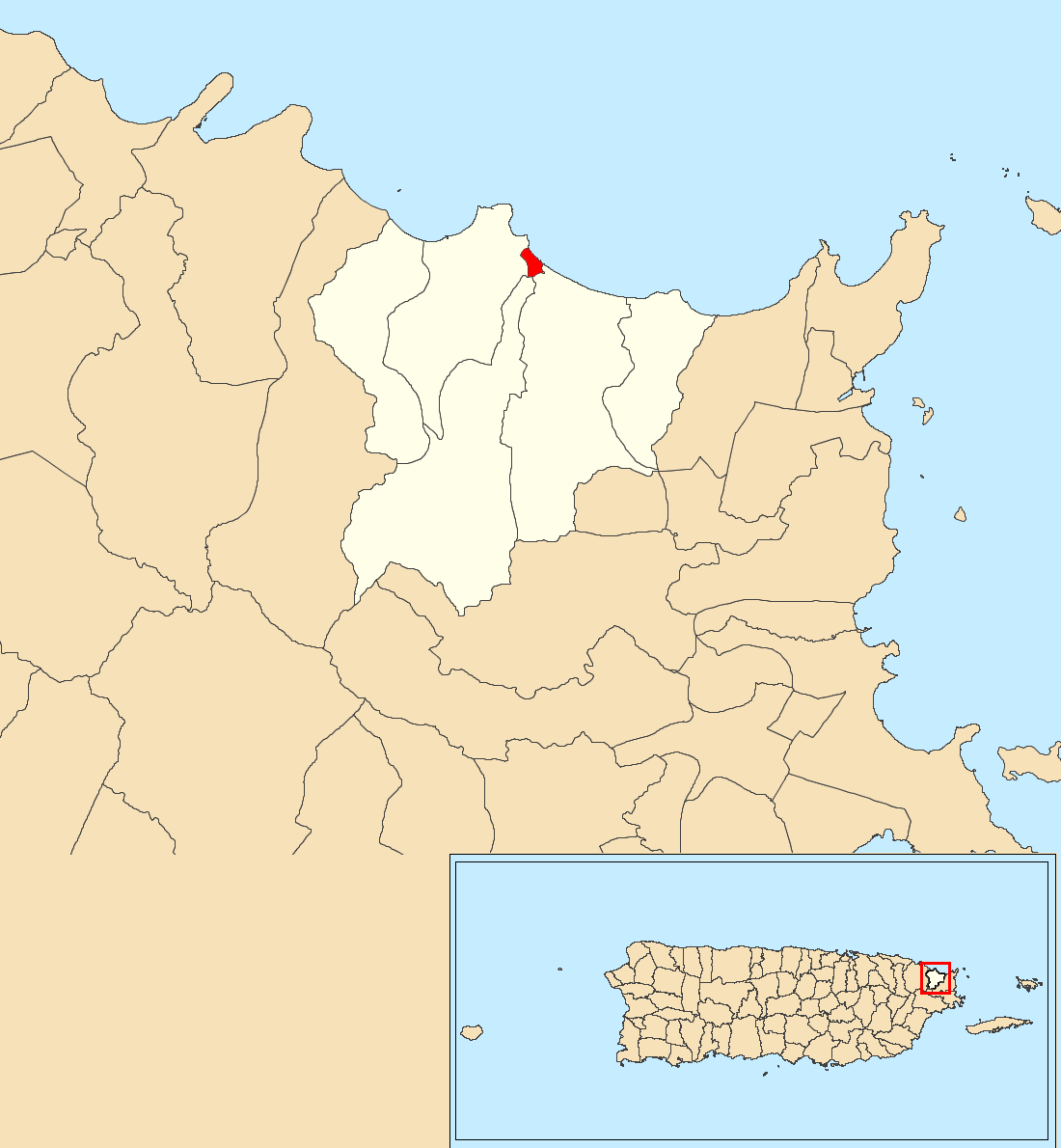
- Location of Luquillo barrio-pueblo within the municipality of Luquillo shown in red

- Location of Puerto Rico
- Coordinates: 18°22′38″N 65°42′54″W
- Commonwealth: Puerto Rico
- Municipality: Luquillo

Area
  - Total: 0.25 sq mi (0.65 km^{2})
  - Land: 0.09 sq mi (0.23 km^{2})
  - Water: 0.16 sq mi (0.41 km^{2})
- Elevation: 0 ft (0 m)

Population (2010)
  - Total: 1,028
  - Density: 11,422.2/sq mi (4,410.1/km^{2})
- Source: 2010 Census
- Time zone: UTC−4 (AST)

Luquillo barrio-pueblo is a barrio and the administrative center (seat) of Luquillo, a municipality of Puerto Rico. Its population in 2010 was 1,028.

As was customary in Spain, in Puerto Rico, the municipality has a barrio called pueblo which contains a central plaza, the municipal buildings (city hall), and a Catholic church. Fiestas patronales (patron saint festivals) are held in the central plaza every year.

Historical population
Census	Pop.	Note	%±
1900	903		—
1910	1,159		28.3%
1920	1,242		7.2%
1930	1,677		35.0%
1940	2,013		20.0%
1950	2,255		12.0%
1960	2,107		−6.6%
1970	0		−100.0%
1980	1,202		—
1990	1,332		10.8%
2000	1,353		1.6%
2010	1,028		−24.0%
U.S. Decennial Census; 1899 (shown as 1900) 1910-1930; 1930-1950 1980-2000 2010

== The central plaza and its church ==
The central plaza, or square, is a place for official and unofficial recreational events and a place where people can gather and socialize from dusk to dawn. The Laws of the Indies, Spanish law, which regulated life in Puerto Rico in the early 19th century, stated the plaza's purpose was for "the parties" (celebrations, festivities) (Spanish: a propósito para las fiestas), and that the square should be proportionally large enough for the number of neighbors (Spanish: grandeza proporcionada al número de vecinos). These Spanish regulations also stated that the streets nearby should be comfortable portals for passersby, protecting them from the elements: sun and rain.

Located across the central plaza in Luquillo barrio-pueblo is the Parroquia San José, a Roman Catholic church built in 1797. Destroyed by hurricanes, it was rebuilt in 1834. The current church, designed by Luis Perocier, was built by 1931. The wood in the church and its tropical motifs was imported from South America.

== History ==
Luquillo barrio-pueblo was in Spain's gazetteers until Puerto Rico was ceded by Spain in the aftermath of the Spanish–American War under the terms of the Treaty of Paris of 1898 and became an unincorporated territory of the United States. In 1899, the United States Department of War conducted a census of Puerto Rico finding that the population of Pueblo of Luquillo was 903.

== Gallery ==
Places in Luquillo barrio-pueblo:

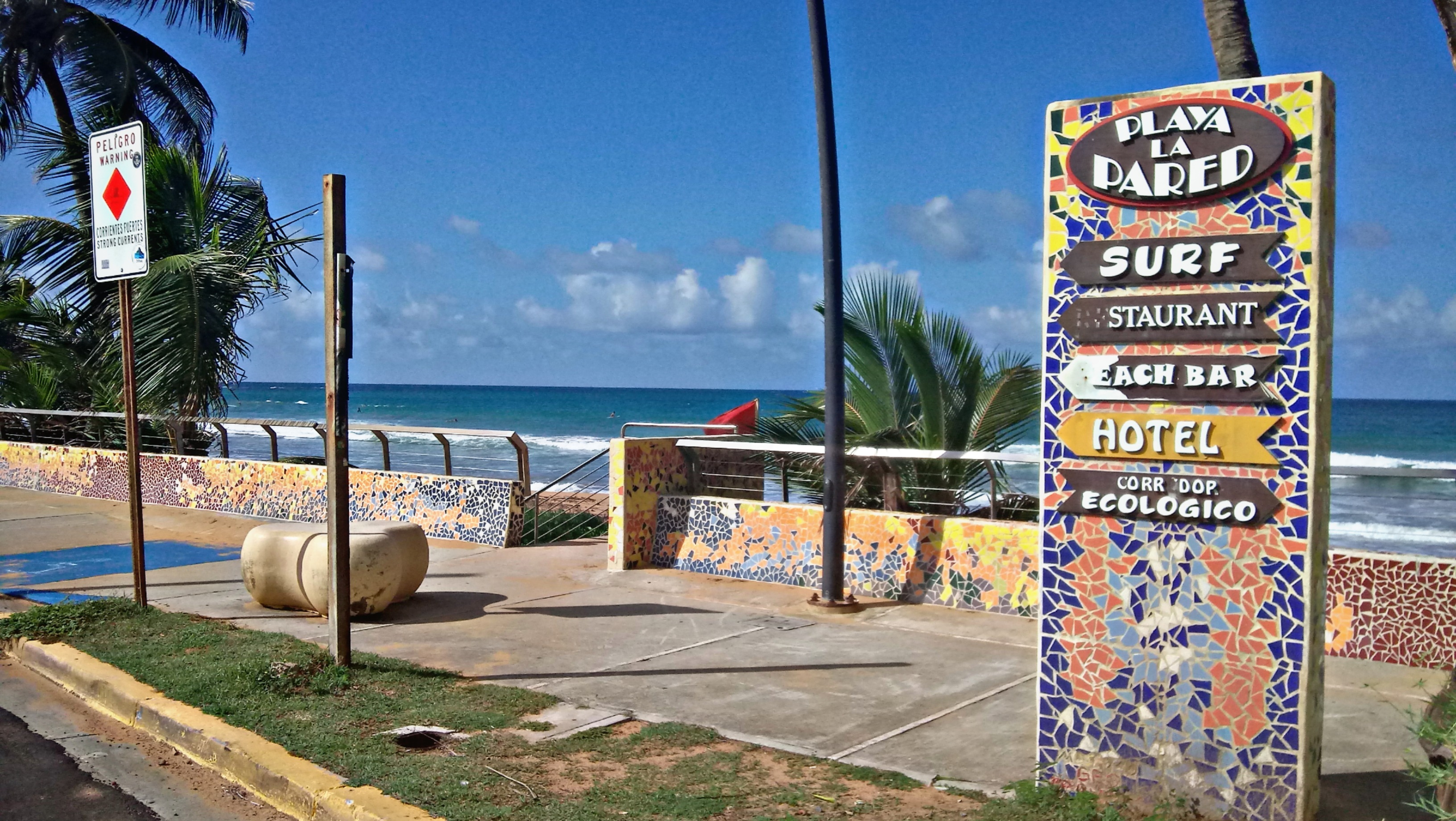
Playa La Pared

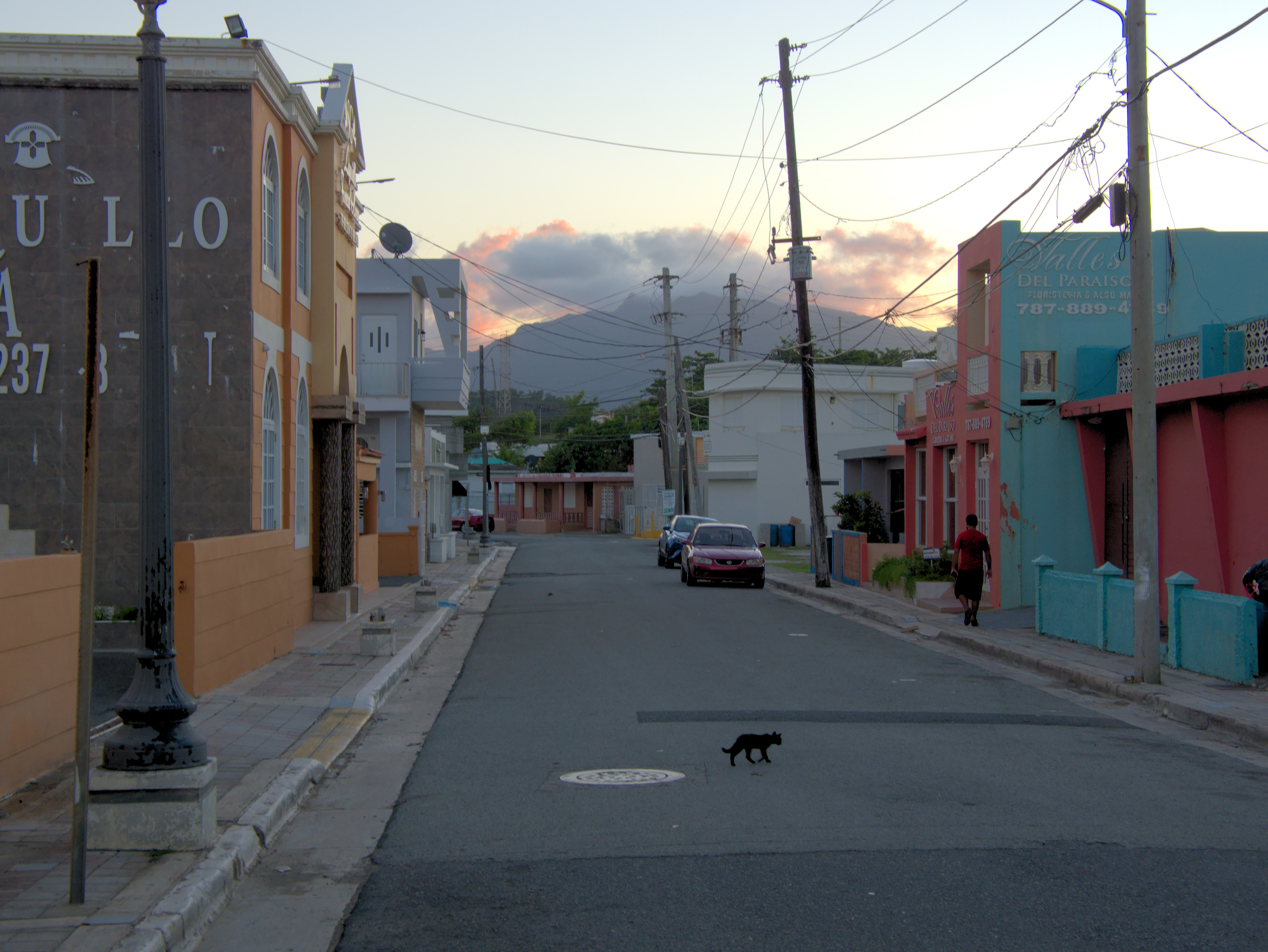
El Yunque

== See also ==
- List of communities in Puerto Rico
