= Fajardo (surname) =

- Place of origin: Spain

Fajardo is a Spanish surname. Notable people with the surname include:

- Arturo Fajardo (born 1961), Uruguayan Catholic bishop
- Brenda Fajardo, (born 1940), Filipino artist and printmaker
- Claudia Fajardo (born 1985), Honduran sport shooter
- Cody Fajardo (born 1992), American football player
- Denisse Fajardo (born 1964), Peruvian volleyball player
- Eduardo Fajardo (1924–2019), Spanish actor
- Felicisimo Fajardo (1914–2001), Filipino basketball player
- Fernando Fajardo (born 1975), Uruguayan football player
- Francisco Fajardo (died 1564), Spanish conquistador
- Franzen Fajardo (born 1982), Filipino actor
- Gabriel Fajardo (1917–2008), Filipino basketball player
- Héctor Fajardo (born 1970), Mexican baseball player
- João Fajardo (born 1978), Portuguese football player
- June Mar Fajardo (born 1989), Filipino basketball player
- Kevin Fajardo (born 1989), Costa Rican football player
- Kim Fajardo (born 1993), Filipino volleyball player
- Luis Fajardo, 2nd Marquis of los Vélez (died 1574), Spanish political and military figure
- Luis Fajardo (footballer) (born 1963), Colombian football player
- Luis Fajardo (Spanish Navy officer) (c. 1556–1617), Spanish admiral
- Mario Fajardo (1961-1991), Captain U.S. Army
- Pablo Fajardo, Ecuadorian lawyer
- Práxedes Fajardo, Philippine revolutionary
- Sergio Fajardo (born 1956), Colombian mathematician and politician
- Sharif Fajardo (born 1976), Puerto Rican basketball player
- Sharon Fajardo (born 1989), Honduran swimmer
- William Fajardo (1929–2002), Mexican fencer
