= Pitahaya, Luquillo, Puerto Rico =

Barrio of Puerto Rico

Pitahaya
- Barrio
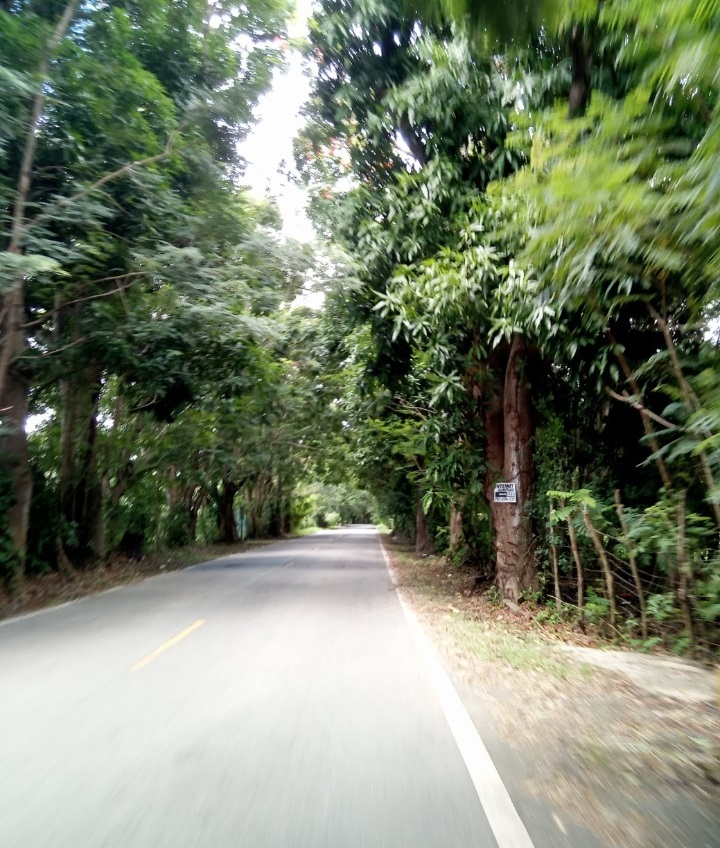
- Entering Casa Blaca Sector in Pitahaya

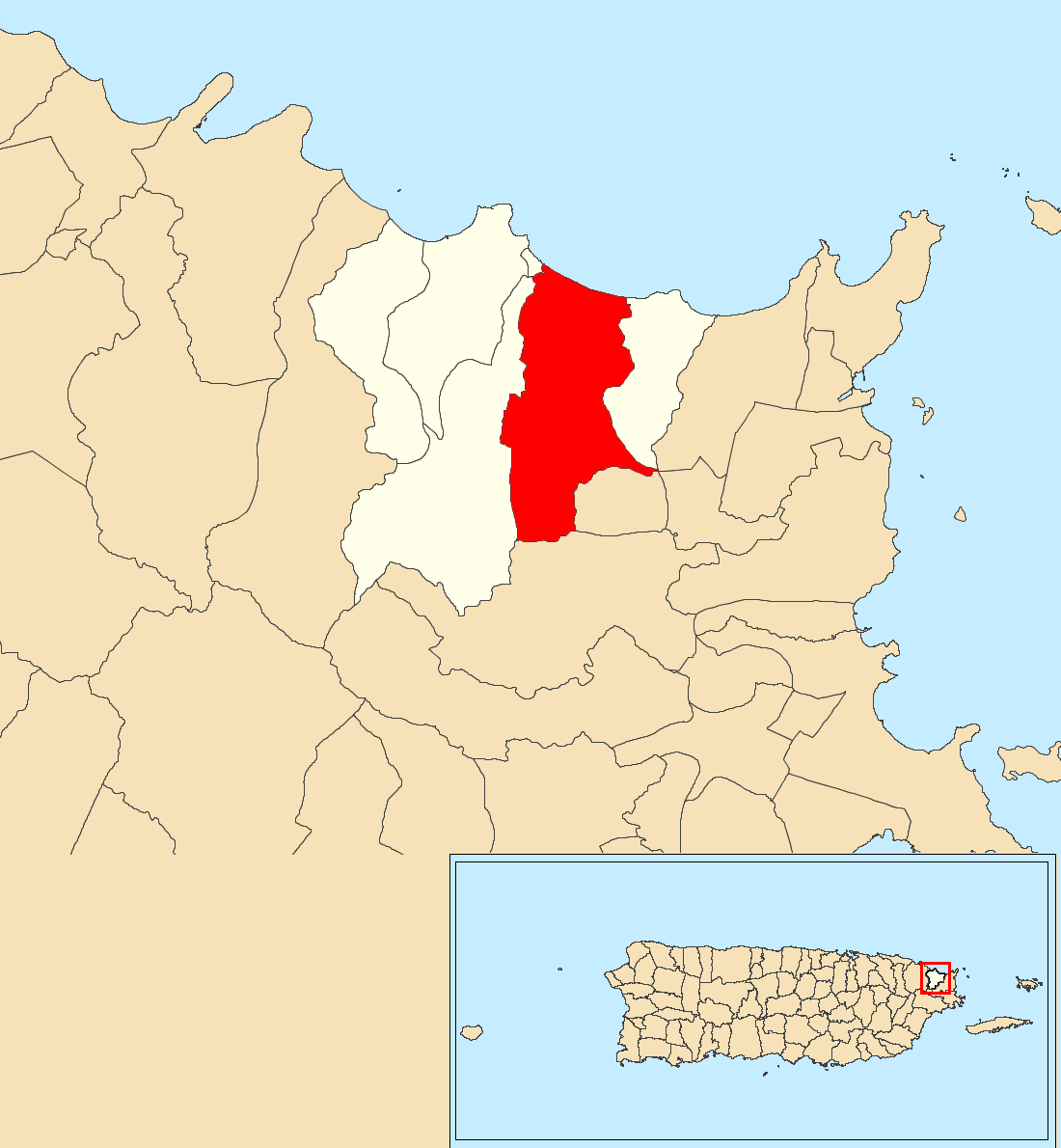
- Location of Pitahaya within the municipality of Luquillo shown in red

- Location of Puerto Rico
- Coordinates: 18°20′33″N 65°42′25″W
- Commonwealth: Puerto Rico
- Municipality: Luquillo

Area
  - Total: 6.99 sq mi (18.1 km^{2})
  - Land: 6.63 sq mi (17.2 km^{2})
  - Water: 0.36 sq mi (0.93 km^{2})
- Elevation: 230 ft (70 m)

Population (2010)
  - Total: 4,523
  - Density: 682.2/sq mi (263.4/km^{2})
- Source: 2010 Census
- Time zone: UTC−4 (AST)

Pitahaya is a barrio in the municipality of Luquillo, Puerto Rico. Its population in 2010 was 4,523.

== History ==
Pitahaya was in Spain's gazetteers until Puerto Rico was ceded by Spain in the aftermath of the Spanish–American War under the terms of the Treaty of Paris of 1898 and became an unincorporated territory of the United States. In 1899, the United States Department of War conducted a census of Puerto Rico finding that the population of Pitahaya barrio was 1,103.

Historical population
Census	Pop.	Note	%±
1900	1,103		—
1910	1,243		12.7%
1920	1,301		4.7%
1930	1,714		31.7%
1940	1,458		−14.9%
1950	2,593		77.8%
1960	2,414		−6.9%
1970	0		−100.0%
1980	3,216		—
1990	4,002		24.4%
2000	4,505		12.6%
2010	4,523		0.4%
U.S. Decennial Census; 1899 (shown as 1900) 1910-1930; 1930-1950 1980-2000 2010

== Sites ==
The Pitahaya River runs through the Casa Blanca sector of the Pitahaya barrio in Luquillo.

== Gallery ==
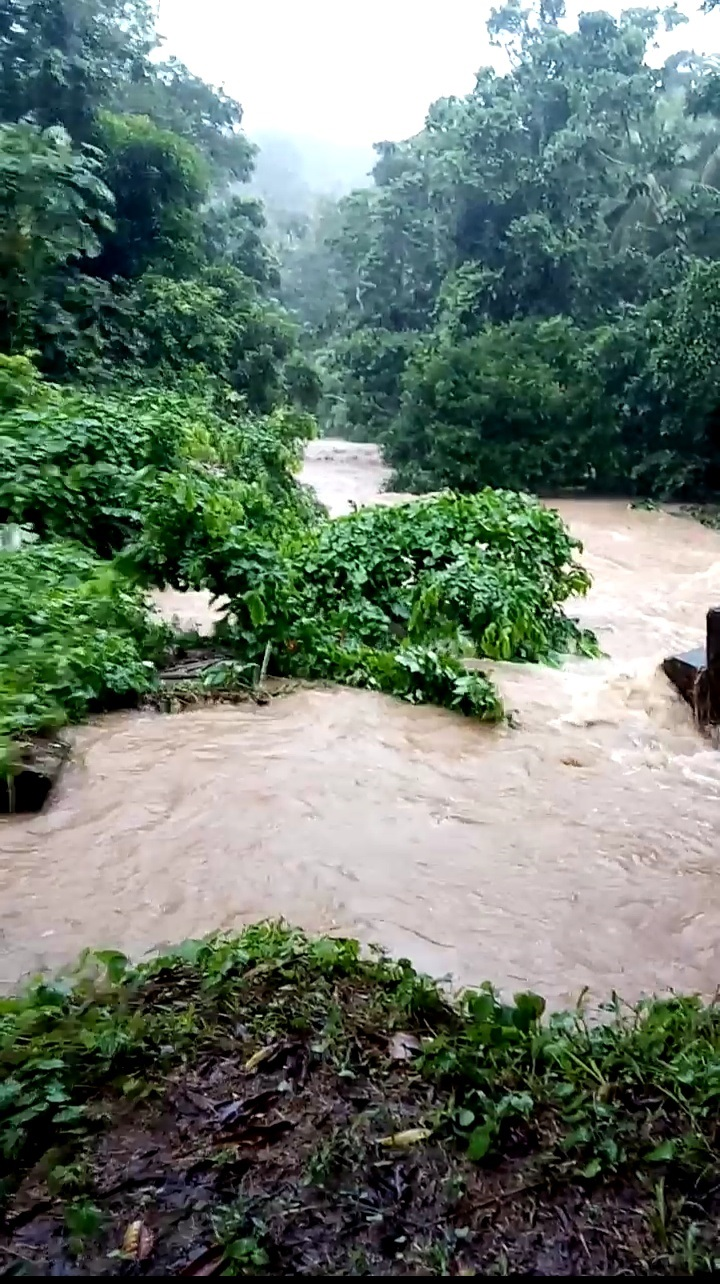
Pitahaya River after Hurricane Isaias

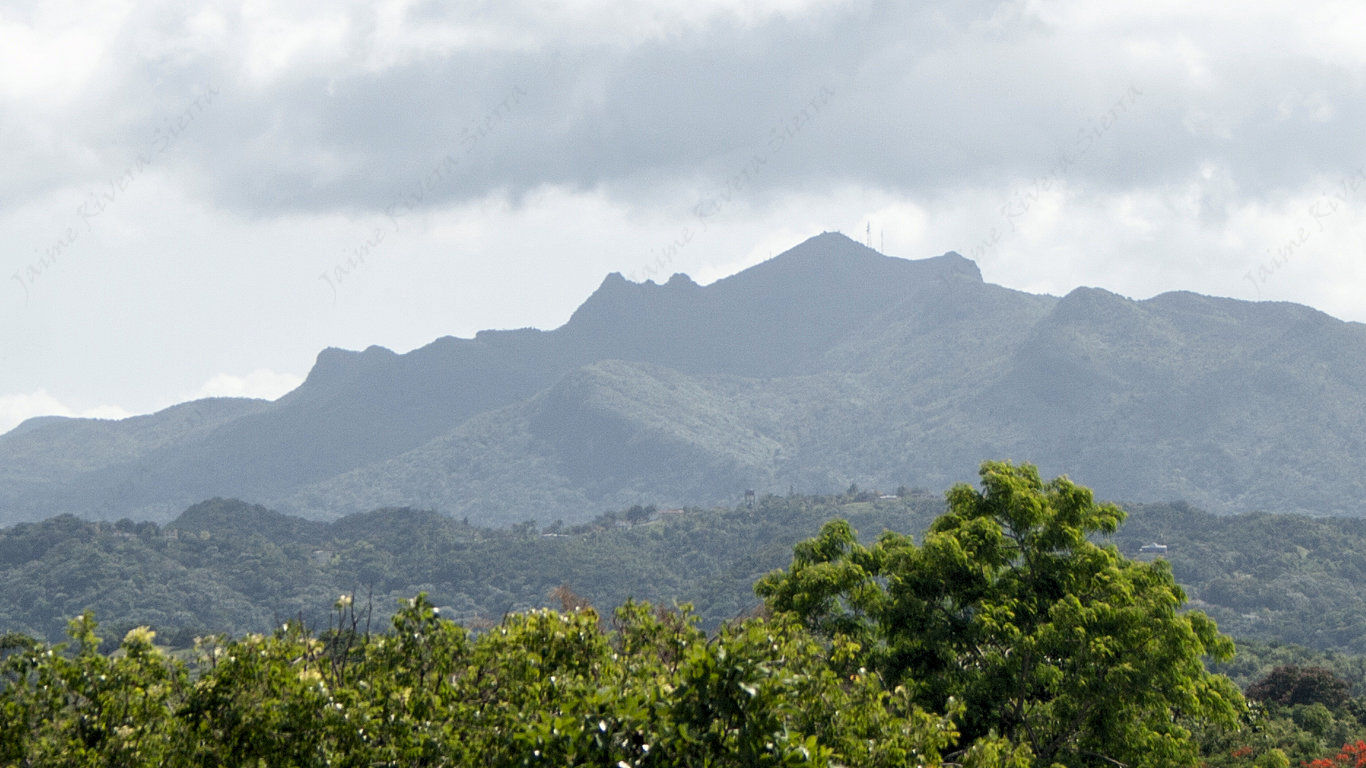
Corredor Ecológico del Este from PR-3 in Pitahaya

== See also ==
- List of communities in Puerto Rico
