= Luquillo, Puerto Rico =

Town and municipality in Puerto Rico

Luquillo Municipio de Luquillo
- Town and Municipality
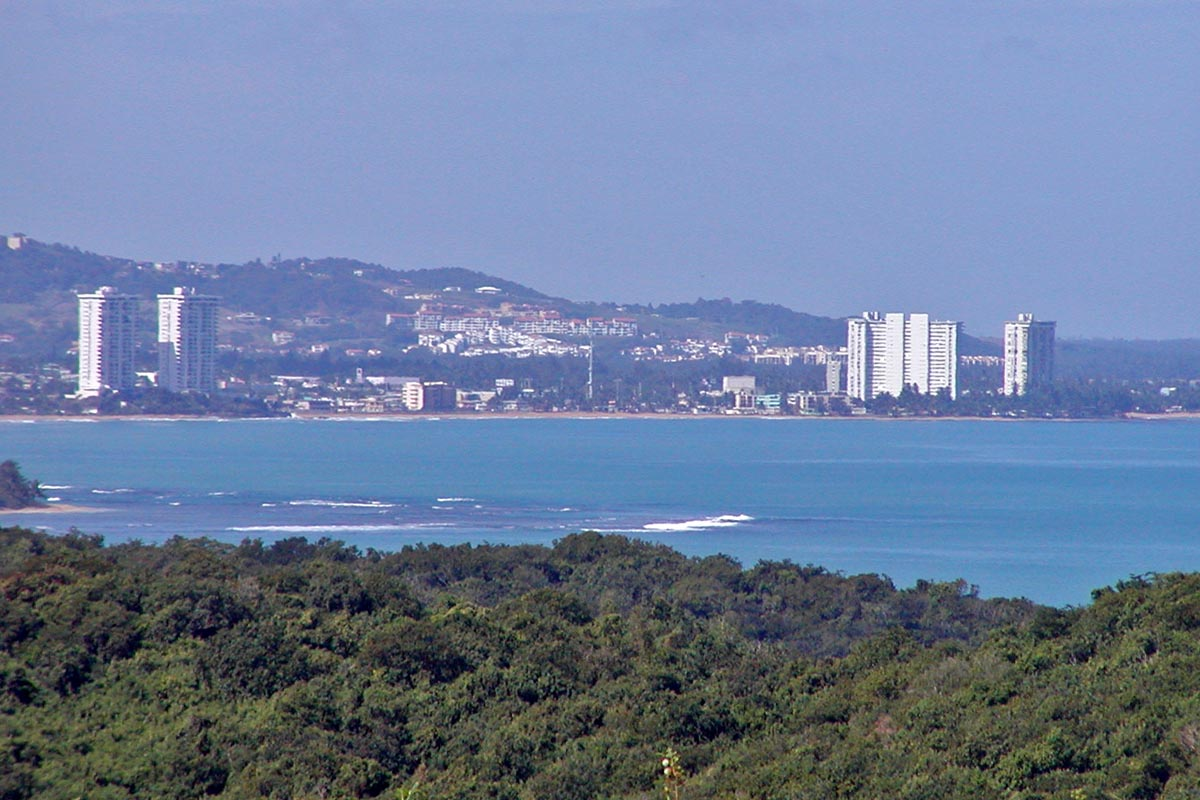
- High rise buildings in Luquillo

- Flag Coat of arms
- Nicknames: "Capital del Sol", "La Riviera de Puerto Rico", "Los Come Cocos"
- Anthem: "Junto a las costas del mar Atlántico"
- Map of Puerto Rico highlighting Luquillo Municipality
- Coordinates: 18°22′21″N 65°43′00″W
- Sovereign state: United States
- Commonwealth: Puerto Rico
- Settled: 1719
- Founded: October 26, 1797
- Barrios: 6 barrios: Juan Martín; Luquillo barrio-pueblo; Mameyes I; Mata de Plátano; Pitahaya; Sabana

Government
  - Mayor: Jesús Márquez Rodríguez (PPD)
  - Senatorial dist.: 8 - Carolina
  - Representative dist.: 36

Area
  - Total: 34.26 sq mi (88.73 km^{2})
  - Land: 26 sq mi (68 km^{2})
  - Water: 8.00 sq mi (20.73 km^{2})

Population (2020)
  - Total: 17,781
  - Estimate (2025): 17,190 ▼
  - Rank: 64th in Puerto Rico
  - Density: 680/sq mi (260/km^{2})
- Demonym: Luquillenses or Luquillanos
- Time zone: UTC−4 (AST)
- ZIP Code: 00773
- Area code: 787/939

Luquillo (Spanish pronunciation: [luˈkiʎo]) is a town and municipality of Puerto Rico located in the northeast coast, northwest of Fajardo; and east of Rio Grande. Luquillo is spread over 5 barrios and Luquillo Pueblo (the downtown area and the administrative center of the city). It lends its name to the Sierra de Luquillo, where El Yunque National Forest is located. It is part of the Fajardo Metropolitan Statistical Area.

The city of Luquillo is 26 square miles and it sits on 12 miles of Atlantic coastline. It is nestled between the blue waters of the Atlantic and the El Yunque National Forest, a rainforest, giving it a diverse and unique ecology. Luquillo marks the beginning of the Northeast Ecological Corridor Nature Reserve which runs down the coast from downtown Luquillo all the way down to the Seven Seas Beach in Fajardo. During certain times of the year, it is not unusual to encounter rare or endangered species of fauna (like the leatherback turtle) while visiting in Luquillo.

== History ==
Luquillo was founded in 1797 and is known as "La Capital del Sol" (Capital of the Sun), "La Riviera de Puerto Rico" (the Puerto Rican Riviera), and "Los Come Cocos" (the coconut eaters). Legend says that the town was named after the Indian cacique Loquillo, who died a few years after the last Indian rebellion in 1513. However, the word Luquillo most likely originates from Yukiyu, the Taino name for El Yunque, most likely meaning "white mountain" (i.e. foggy mountain).In 1989, Hurricane Hugo damaged the town.

On September 20, 2017 Hurricane Maria struck the island of Puerto Rico. In Luquillo, rivers were breached, there were landslides, the electrical power collapsed, and 1100 homes were destroyed or damaged. Incidents of looting and assaults were reported in the aftermath of the storm.

== Geography ==
Luquillo is located on the northeast coast.

=== Barrios ===
Like all municipalities of Puerto Rico, Luquillo is subdivided into barrios. The municipal buildings, central square and large Catholic church are located in a barrio referred to as "el pueblo".

1. Juan Martín
2. Luquillo barrio-pueblo
3. Mameyes I has a Playa Fortuna Community
4. Mata de Plátano has a Playa Fortuna Community
5. Pitahaya
6. Sabana

=== Sectors ===
Barrios (which are, in contemporary times, roughly comparable to minor civil divisions) and subbarrios, are further subdivided into smaller areas called sectores (sectors in English). The types of sectores may vary, from normally sector to urbanización to reparto to barriada to residencial, among others.

=== Special Communities ===
Comunidades Especiales de Puerto Rico (Special Communities of Puerto Rico) are marginalized communities whose citizens are experiencing a certain amount of social exclusion. A map shows these communities occur in nearly every municipality of the commonwealth. Of the 742 places that were on the list in 2014, the following barrios, communities, sectors, or neighborhoods were in Luquillo: Barrio Pitahaya, Sector Santo Domingo, Mata de Plátano, Río Chiquito, and Sector Fortuna Playa.

== Tourism ==
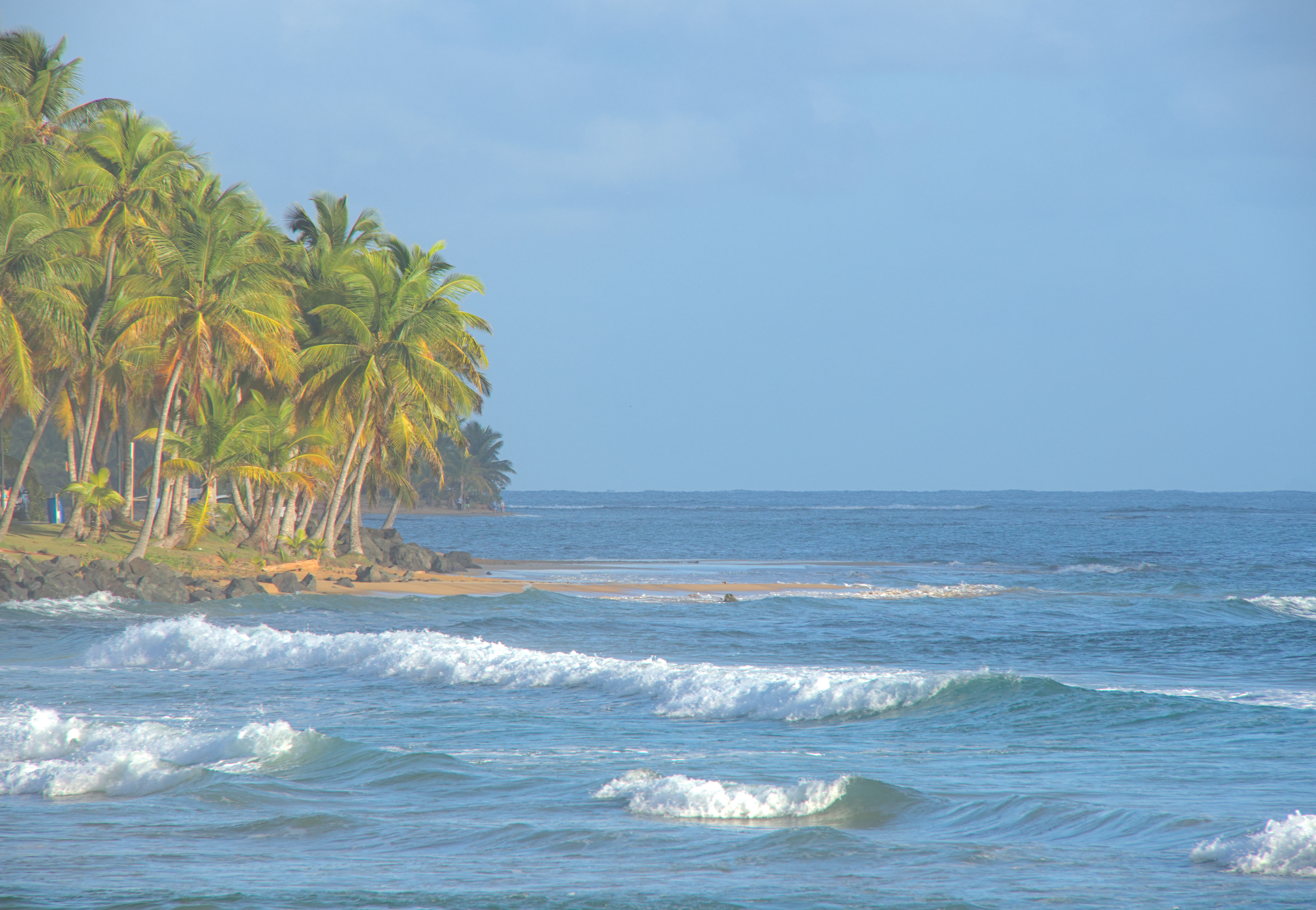
A view of Luquillo Beach

There are 14 beaches in Luquillo including La Pared. La Pared, which translates to "The Wall", is considered a dangerous beach. The coastal highway going east from San Juan, leads to Luquillo Beach, officially known as La Monserrate Beach (Balneario de la Monserrate). It spans a mile and contains a large plantation of coconut palms. It is equipped with various facilities, including a cafeteria and showers.

=== Landmarks and places of interest ===
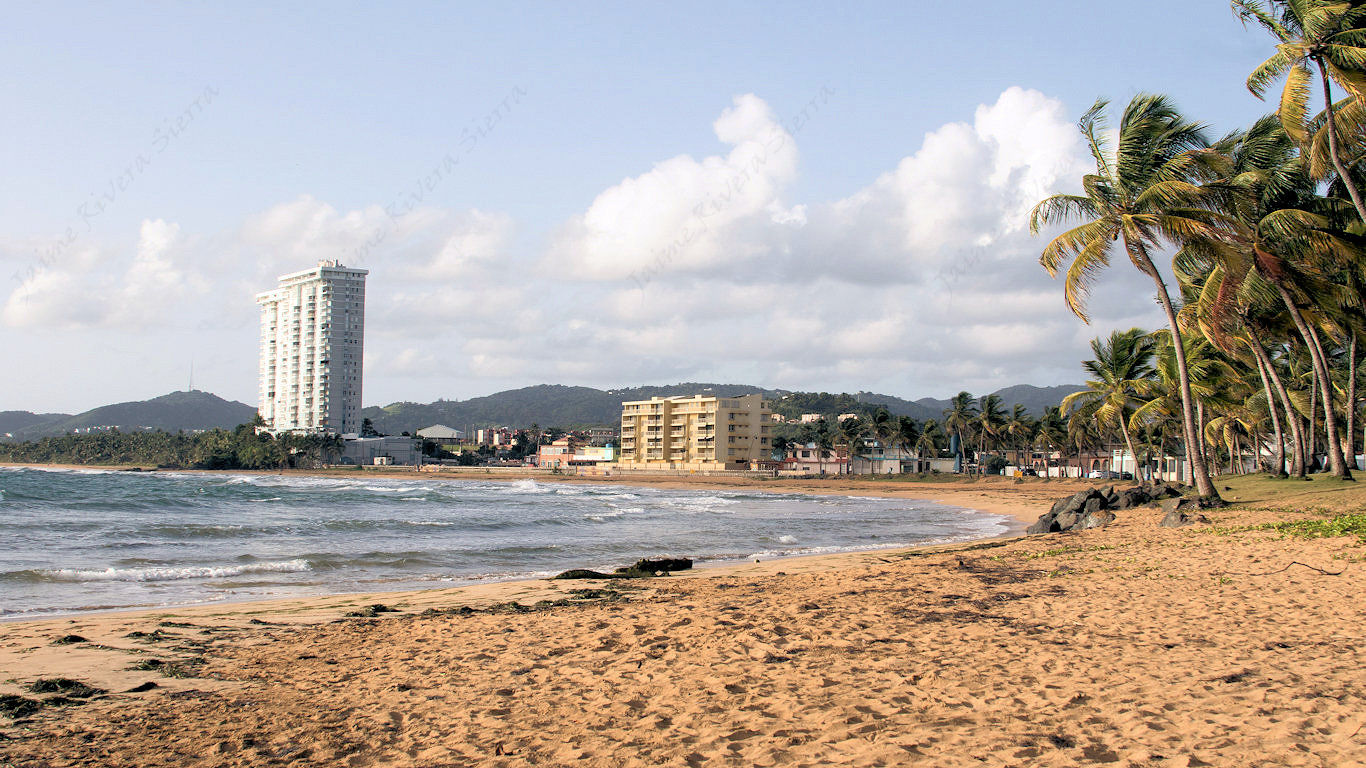
View of Luquillo

- Chief Loquillo Monument
- La Fortuna Hacienda
- La Bandera Beach
- La Monserrate Beach, also known as Luquillo Beach
- La Pared Beach
- Las Pailas Beach
- Mameyes Beach
- Ocean View Boulevard
- Fortuna Beach
- The Recreational Park
- The Kiosks at Luquillo Beach
- La Selva Reef Break

== Culture ==
=== Festivals and events ===
Luquillo celebrates its patron saint festival in March. The Fiestas Patronales de San Jose is a religious and cultural celebration that generally features parades, games, artisans, amusement rides, regional food, and live entertainment.

Other festivals and events celebrated in Luquillo include:

- Leatherback Turtle Festival - April
- Festival de Zangueros - June
- Coconut Festival - September
- Traditional Cooking Festival - December

== Demographics ==
Historical population
Census	Pop.	Note	%±
1920	6,251		—
1930	7,799		24.8%
1940	8,851		13.5%
1950	9,967		12.6%
1960	8,582		−13.9%
1970	10,390		21.1%
1980	14,895		43.4%
1990	18,100		21.5%
2000	19,817		9.5%
2010	20,068		1.3%
2020	17,781		−11.4%
2025 (est.)	17,190	▼	−3.3%
U.S. Decennial Census; 1920-1930; 1930-1950 1960-2000 2010 2020

Ethnicity - Luquillo, Puerto Rico - 2005
Race	Population	% of Total
White	10,112	57.4%
Black/African American	4,345	23.7%
American Indian and Alaska Native	120	0.6%
Asian	62	0.3%
Native Hawaiian/Pacific Islander	3	0.0%
Some other race	2,933	14.8%
Two or more races	610	3.1%

== Government ==
Like all municipalities in Puerto Rico, Luquillo is administered by a mayor. The current mayor is Jesús Márquez Rodríguez, who was first elected at the 2012 general election.

The city belongs to the Puerto Rico Senatorial district VIII, which is represented by two Senators. In 2024, Marissa Jiménez and Héctor Joaquín Sánchez Álvarez were elected as District Senators.

== Transportation ==
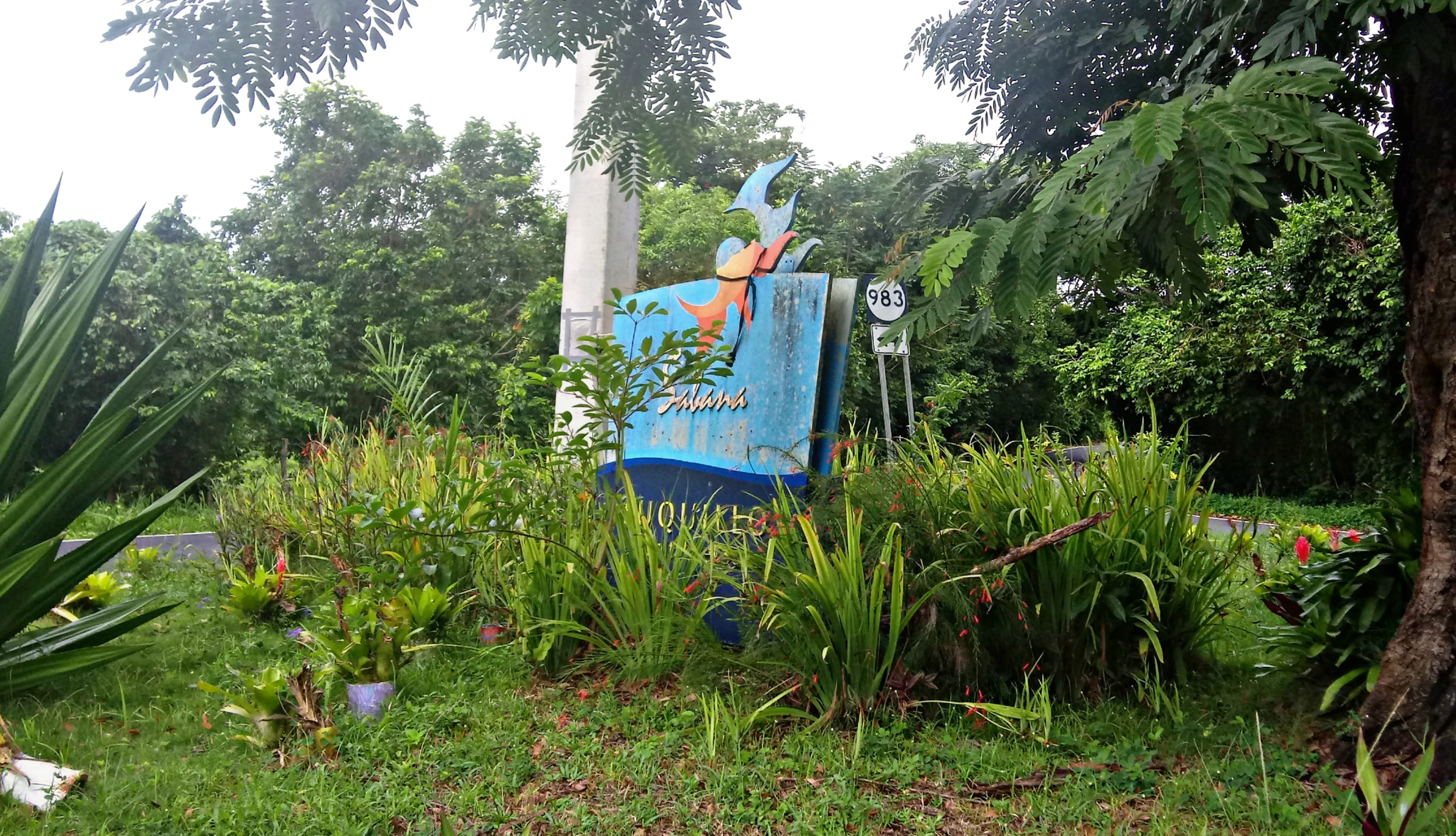
Entrance sign for Sabana barrio and PR-983

There is no public transportation in Luquillo, and residents and visitors rely on rideshares or taxis for transport.

There are 20 bridges in Luquillo.

PR-3 is the main road through Luquillo. Other municipality roads include PR-983, PR-988, PR-991 and PR-940.

== Symbols ==
The municipio has an official flag and coat of arms.

=== Flag ===
It consists of three horizontal stripes, the blue top and green bottom are double of width of the yellow central stripe. Blue makes reference to the sky and the sea; yellow represents the sand of its beaches and green represents the vegetation of the mountains. In the center stripe resides the coat of arms of the municipality superimposed and surrounded by two palm tree leaves crossed at the bottom.

=== Coat of arms ===
In a gold background a centered mountain range with three green mountains is accompanied at the bottom by a bay with blue and silver waves; the top portion of the shield in blue, has three iris branches. Above the shield resides a three tower gold crown. Surrounding the shield by its flanks are two palms trees leaves crossed at the bottom.

== Gallery ==
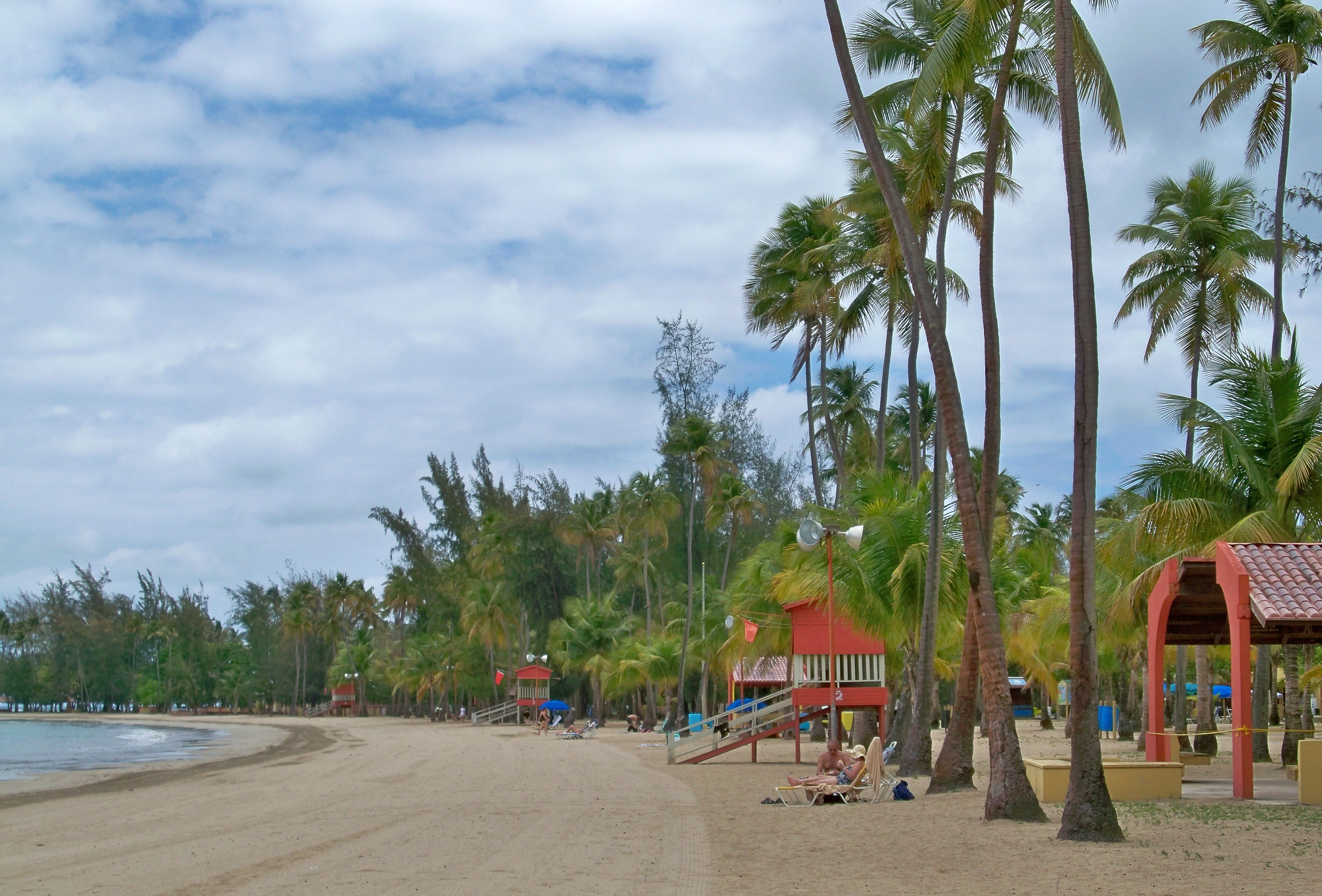
Luquillo Beach

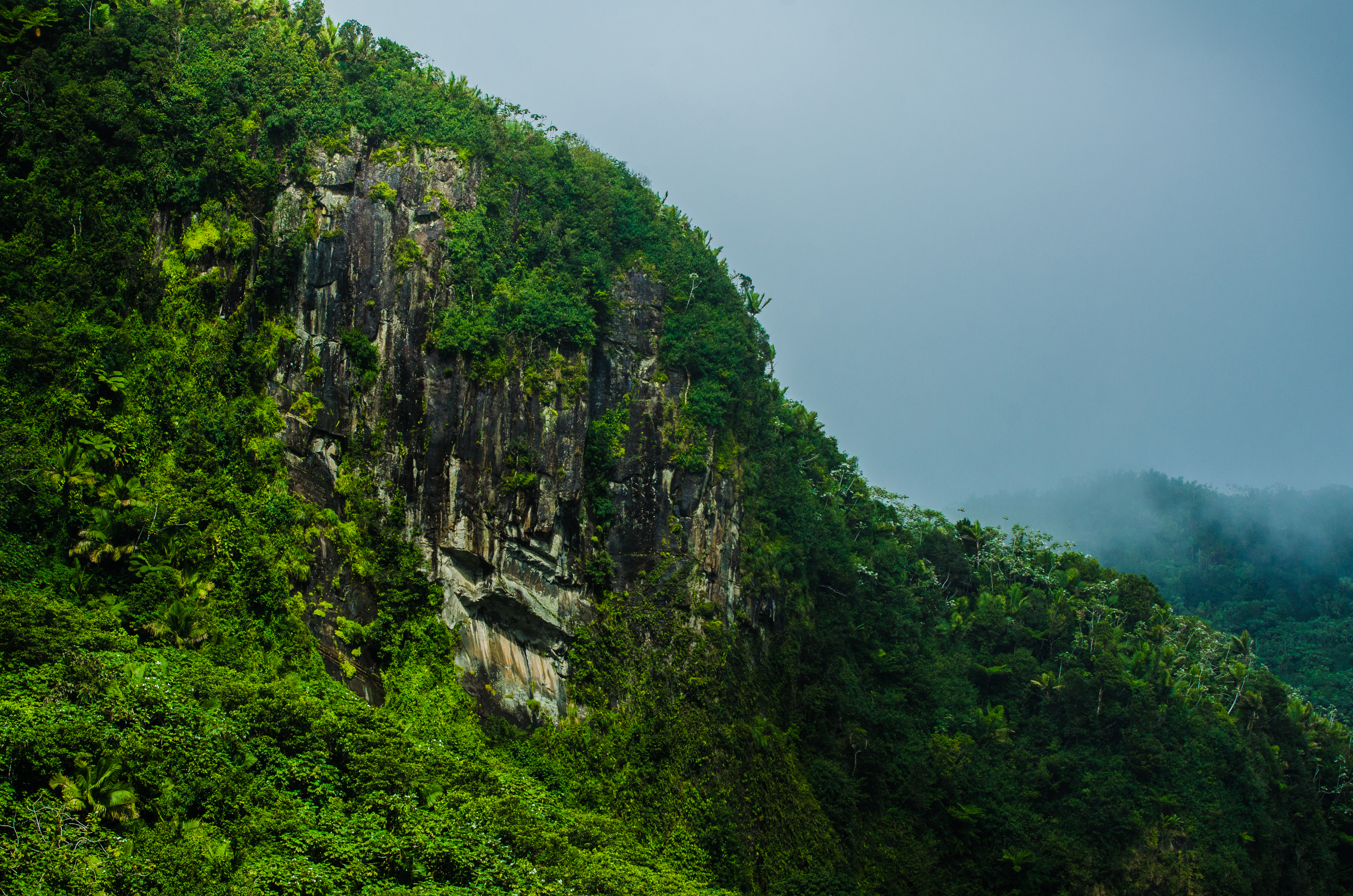
Mountain in Luquillo

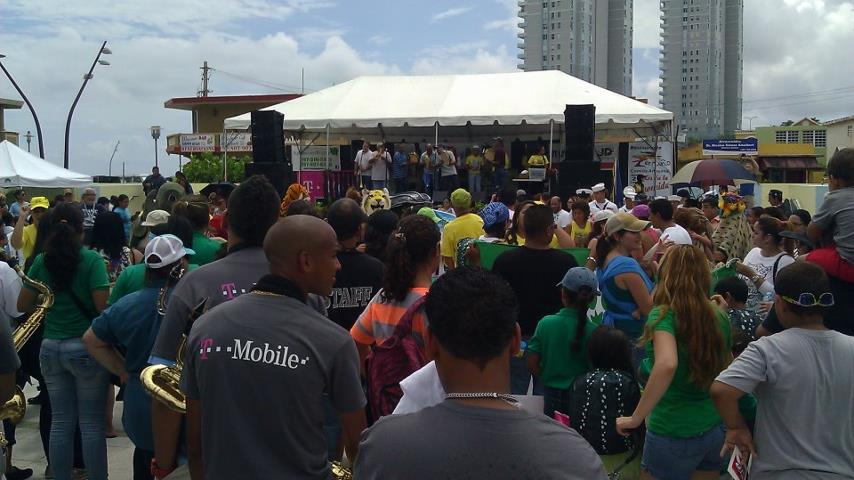
Festival in Luquillo

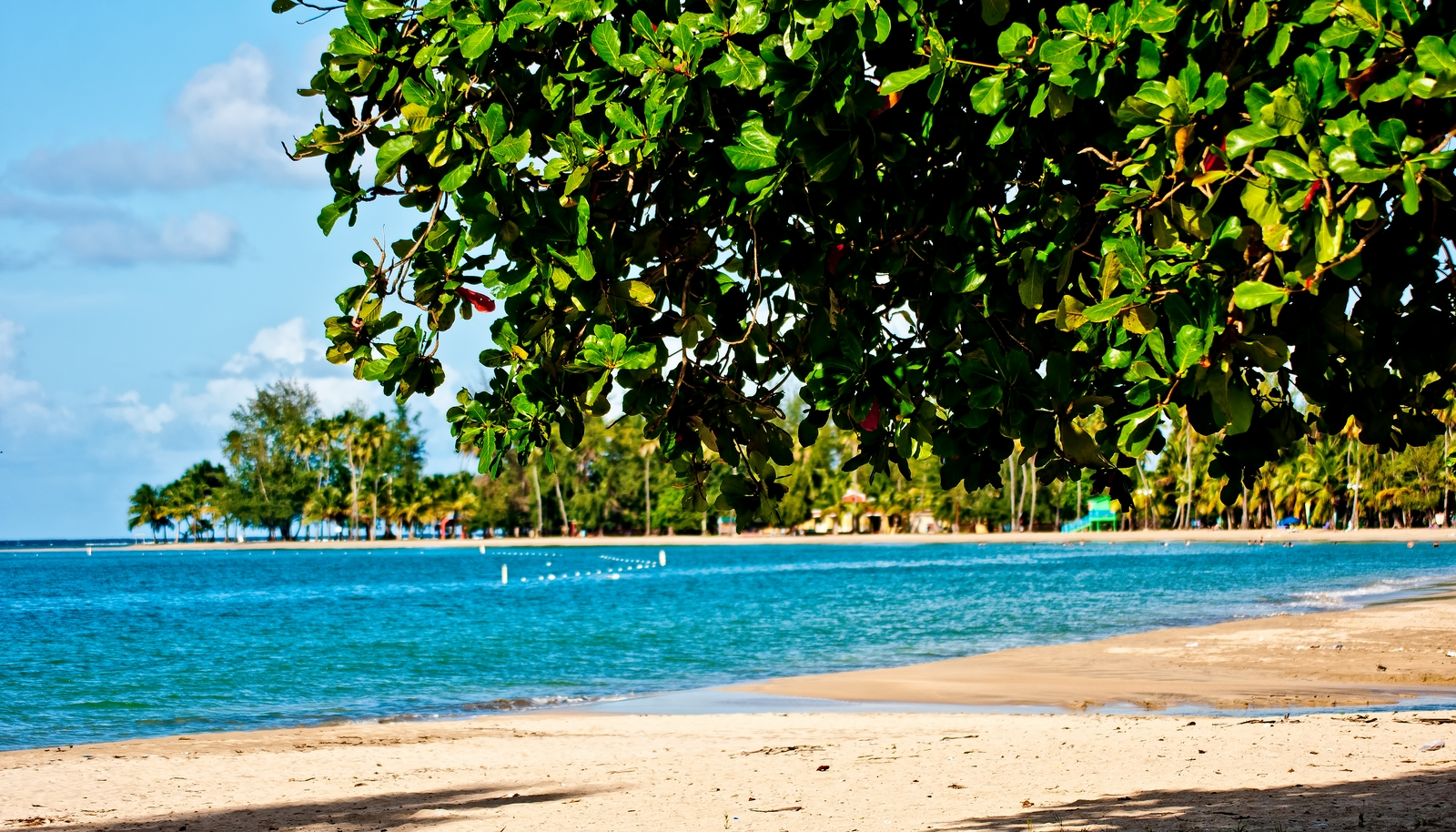
Luquillo Beach, Luquillo

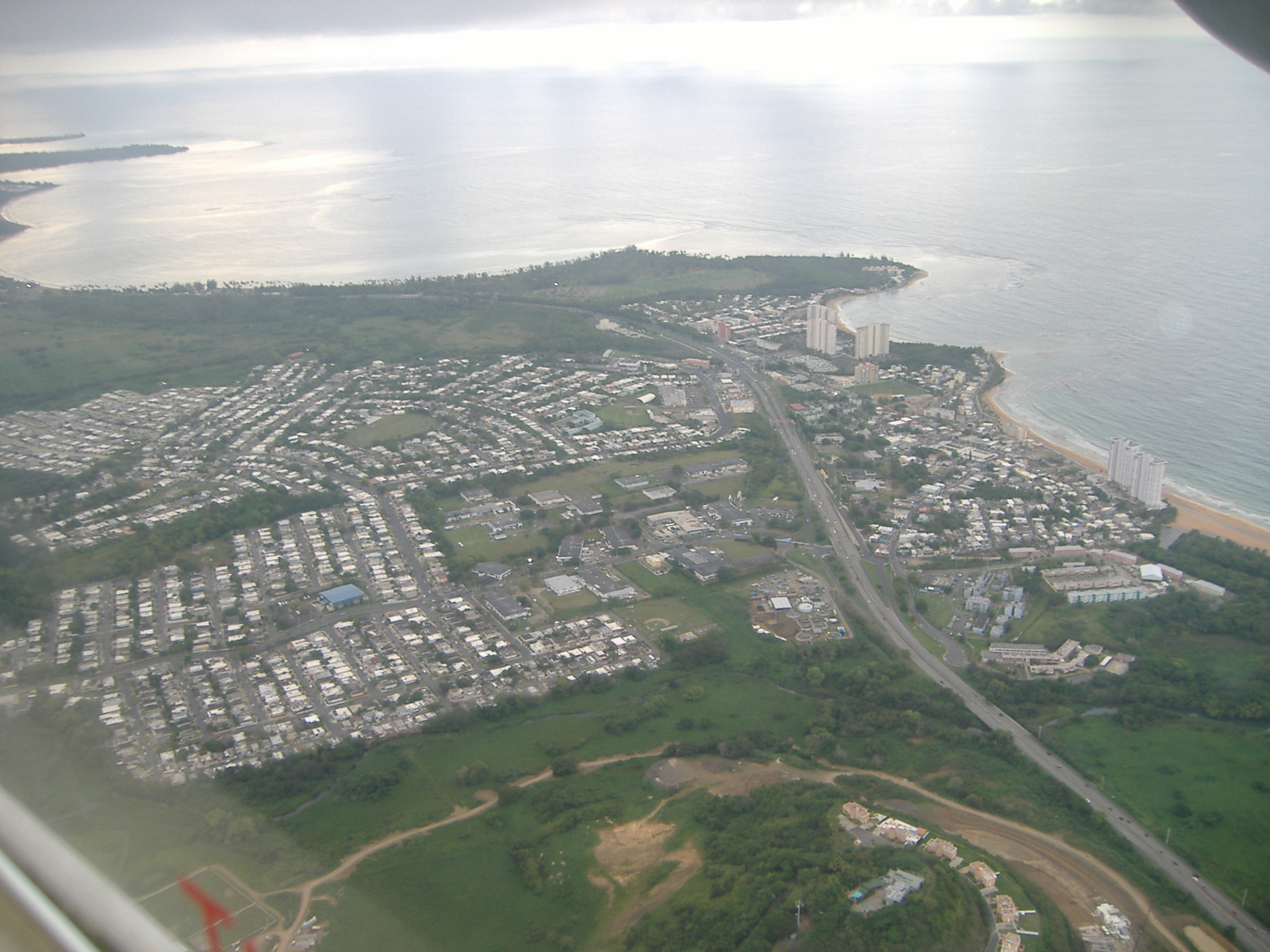
Aerial view of Luquillo

== See also ==
- List of Puerto Ricans
- History of Puerto Rico
