= Puerto Rico Highway 31 =

Highway in Puerto Rico

Highway 31
- Ruta 31

Route information
- Maintained by Puerto Rico DTPW
- Length: 25.55 km (15.88 mi)
- Existed: 1953–present

Major junctions
- West end: PR-30 / PR-189 in Ceiba Norte
- PR-198 in Ceiba Norte; PR-9185 in Ceiba Norte; PR-948 / PR-9936 in El Río; PR-936 in Boquerón–El Río; PR-924 in Peña Pobre; PR-191 in Río Blanco; PR-53 in Río Blanco; PR-192 in Río–Maizales; PR-205 in Naguabo barrio-pueblo–Duque; PR-971 in Duque–Mariana
- East end: PR-3 in Mariana

Location
- Country: United States
- Territory: Puerto Rico
- Municipalities: Juncos, Las Piedras, Naguabo

Highway system
- Roads in Puerto Rico; List
← PR-30	→ PR-32

Puerto Rico Highway 31 (PR-31) is a main, rural highway connecting Juncos with Naguabo in eastern Puerto Rico. This road begins at Puerto Rico Highway 198 and ends at Puerto Rico Highway 3.

== Route description ==
PR-31 is an alternate route for people who are going from Caguas and other nearby towns to Naguabo, without having to pass through Humacao. It is located south of El Yunque and is constantly flooded, even with little rainfall. Several farms are close to this highway and it has two intersections with Puerto Rico Highway 53. Taking PR-30 and PR-53 to Naguabo can be faster depending on the traffic.

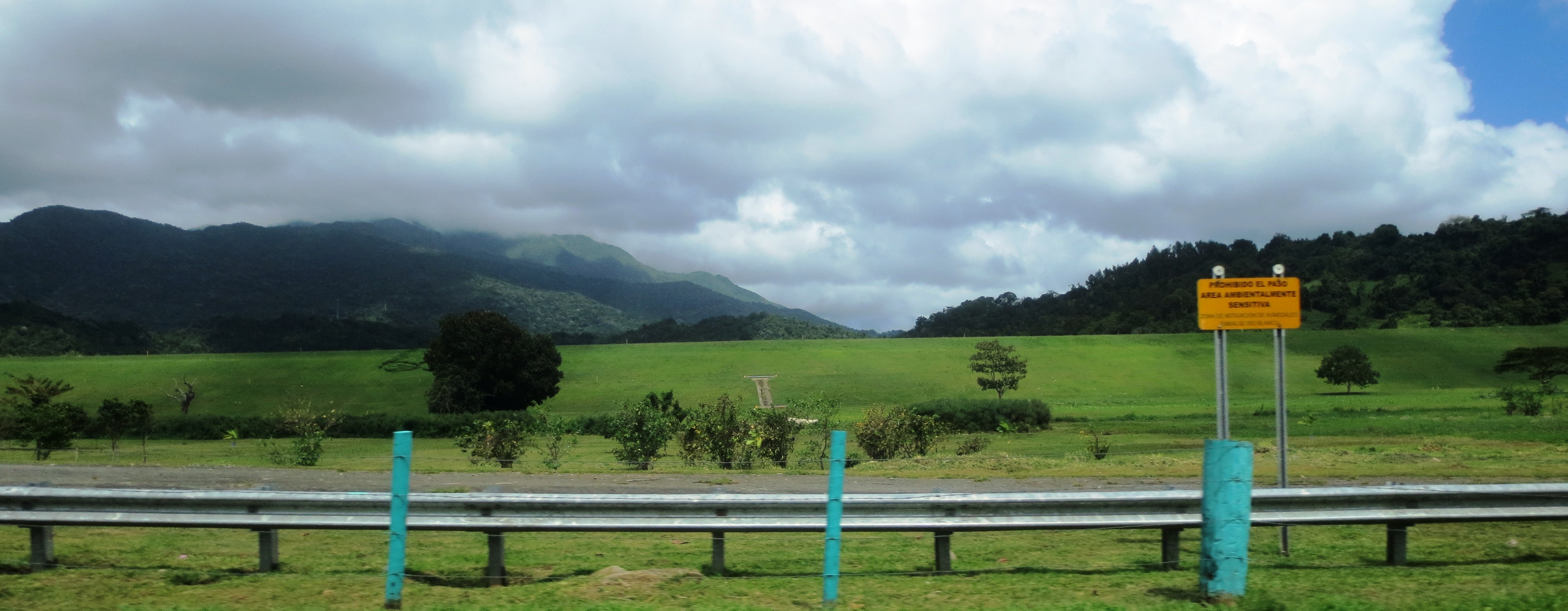
View from PR-31 in Naguabo

== Major intersections ==
Municipality	Location	km	mi	Destinations	Notes
Juncos	Ceiba Norte	25.55	15.88	PR-189 – Juncos	Continuation beyond PR-30
Juncos	Ceiba Norte	25.55	15.88	PR-30 (Expreso Cruz Ortiz Stella) – Caguas, Humacao	Western terminus of PR-31 and eastern terminus of PR-189; PR-30 exit 14; diamond interchange
Juncos	Ceiba Norte	25.4	15.8	PR-198 (Calle Víctor Torres) – Las Piedras	
Juncos	Ceiba Norte	24.6	15.3	PR-935 – Ceiba Norte	
Juncos	Ceiba Norte	23.5– 23.4	14.6– 14.5	PR-9185 west – Gurabo, La Placita	
Juncos	Gurabo Abajo	22.8	14.2	PR-946 – Gurabo Abajo	
Juncos	Caimito	20.0	12.4	PR-947 – Caimito	
Las Piedras	El Río	18.2	11.3	PR-948 / PR-9936 – Las Piedras, El Río	
Las Piedras	El Río	16.5	10.3	PR-949 – El Río	
Las Piedras	Boquerón–El Río line	14.9	9.3	PR-936 – Las Piedras	
Naguabo	Peña Pobre	14.5	9.0	PR-950 – Peña Pobre	
Naguabo	Peña Pobre	13.3	8.3	PR-924 (Carretera Luz Ercilia "Lucy" Fabery Zenón) – Humacao	
Naguabo	Río Blanco	9.7	6.0	PR-950 – Peña Pobre	
Naguabo	Río Blanco	8.8– 8.7	5.5– 5.4	Puente de Río Blanco over the Río Blanco	
Naguabo	Río Blanco	8.7	5.4	PR-191 – El Yunque National Forest	
Naguabo	Río Blanco	7.9	4.9	PR-53 north (Autopista Dr. José Celso Barbosa) – Ceiba, Fajardo	PR-53 exit 22; incomplete diamond interchange; southbound exit and northbound entrance
Naguabo	Río–Maizales line	6.4	4.0	PR-970 – Maizales	
Naguabo	Río–Maizales line	4.2– 4.1	2.6– 2.5	PR-192 – Naguabo	
Naguabo	Naguabo barrio-pueblo–Duque line	3.8– 3.7	2.4– 2.3	PR-205 north – Fajardo, Humacao	
Naguabo	Duque–Mariana line	2.8– 2.7	1.7– 1.7	PR-971 – Naguabo, Duque	
Naguabo	Mariana	0.0	0.0	PR-3 – Ceiba, Humacao	Eastern terminus of PR-31
1.000 mi = 1.609 km; 1.000 km = 0.621 mi: Incomplete access

== See also ==
- 1953 Puerto Rico highway renumbering
