= Puerto Rico Highway 205 =

Highway in Puerto Rico

Highway 205
- Ruta 205

Route information
- Maintained by Puerto Rico DTPW
- Length: 0.4 km (0.25 mi; 1,300 ft)

Major junctions
- South end: PR-31 in Naguabo barrio-pueblo–Duque
- North end: PR-53 in Duque

Location
- Country: United States
- Territory: Puerto Rico
- Municipalities: Naguabo

Highway system
- Roads in Puerto Rico; List
← PR-204	→ PR-206

Puerto Rico Highway 205 (PR-205) is a short avenue in Naguabo, Puerto Rico. This road connects PR-53 with PR-31 in the urban area.

== Major intersections ==
The entire route is located in Naguabo.

Location	km	mi	Destinations	Notes
Naguabo barrio-pueblo–Duque line	0.0	0.0	PR-31 (Carretera Carmen Delia Dipiní Piñero) – Naguabo	Southern terminus of PR-205
Duque	0.4	0.25	PR-53 (Autopista Dr. José Celso Barbosa) – Fajardo, Humacao	Northern terminus of PR-205; PR-53 exit 18; diamond interchange
1.000 mi = 1.609 km; 1.000 km = 0.621 mi
