= Puerto Rico Highway 53 =

Highway in Puerto Rico

Highway 53
- Ruta 53
- Autopista Dr. José Celso Barbosa
- PR-53 highlighted in red; future segments in yellow

Route information
- Maintained by Metropistas
- Length: 94.0 km (58.4 mi)
- Existed: 1988–present

Major junctions
- South end: PR-52 in Lapa
- PR-54 in Palmas; PR-3 in Palmas; PR-3 in Pollos; PR-901 in Emajagua; PR-9914 in Camino Nuevo; PR-906 in Candelero Abajo–Buena Vista; PR-30 in Buena Vista; PR-3 in Río Abajo; PR-31 in Río Blanco; PR-205 in Duque
- North end: PR-3 in Quebrada Vueltas

Location
- Country: United States
- Territory: Puerto Rico
- Municipalities: Salinas, Guayama, Arroyo, Patillas, Maunabo, Yabucoa, Humacao, Naguabo, Ceiba, Fajardo

Highway system
- Roads in Puerto Rico; List
| ← PR-52 | → PR-54 |

Puerto Rico Highway 53 (PR-53) or unsigned Interstate PR3 is a main tollway that is parallel to Puerto Rico Highway 3, which goes from Fajardo to Salinas. Some segments are still in planning, but when finished it will be about 58 miles (93 km) in length. Two tunnels, about 0.6 mi (1 km) long each, in the towns of Yabucoa and Maunabo were completed in October 2008. It will connect the cities of Fajardo, Ceiba, Naguabo, Humacao, Yabucoa, Maunabo, Patillas, Arroyo, Guayama and Salinas, thus bordering the entire eastern and southeastern coasts of Puerto Rico. Its northern terminus is at PR-3 and PR-194 in Fajardo, and its south terminus is at PR-52 in Salinas.

== Route description ==
The highway consists of five toll plazas; these are at Ceiba Norte, Humacao Norte, Humacao Sur (near Palmas del Mar), Guayama and Salinas. All toll plazas have AutoExpreso lanes.

Southern segments

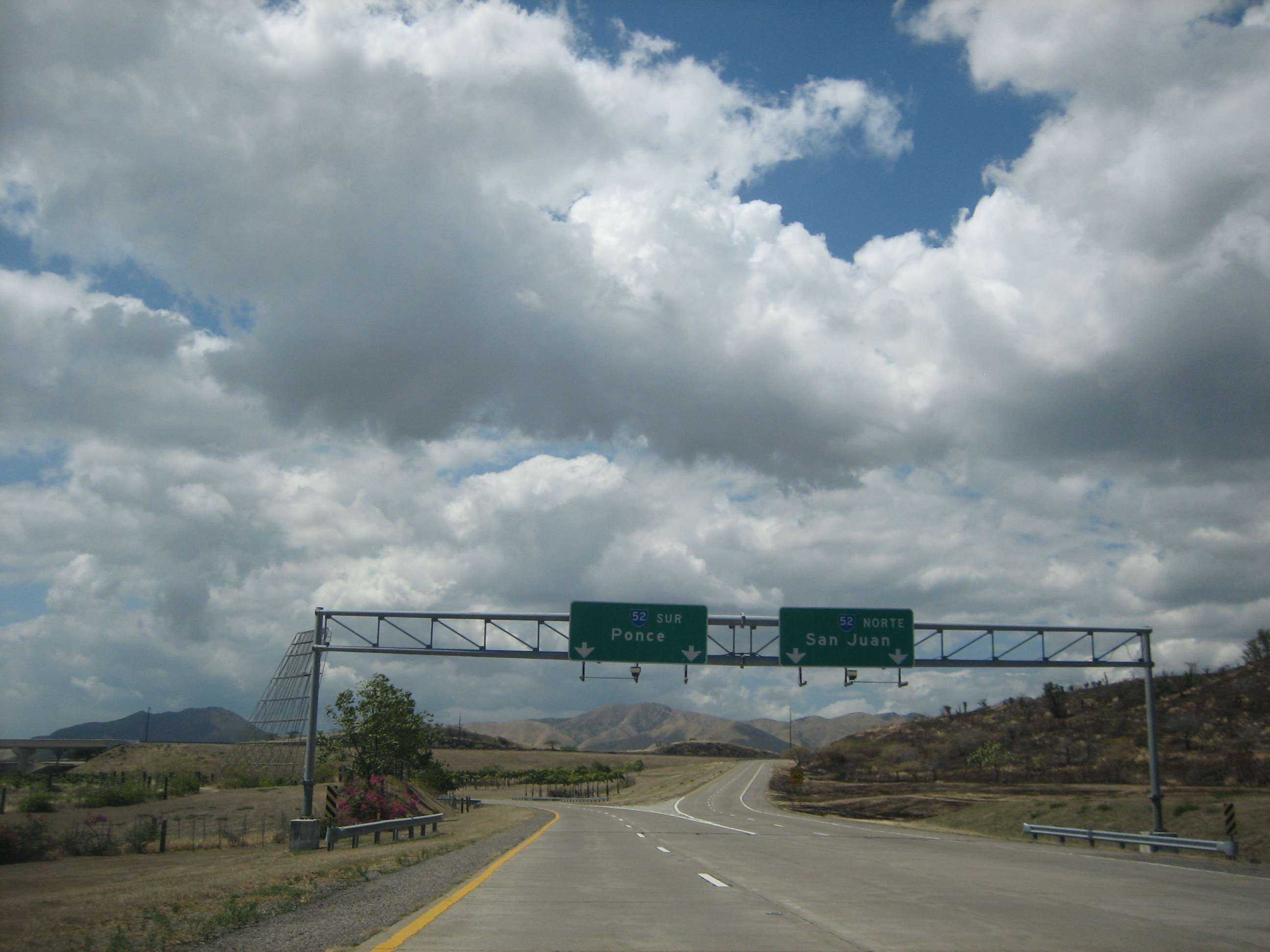
Southwestern terminus of PR-53 in Salinas, connecting with PR-52

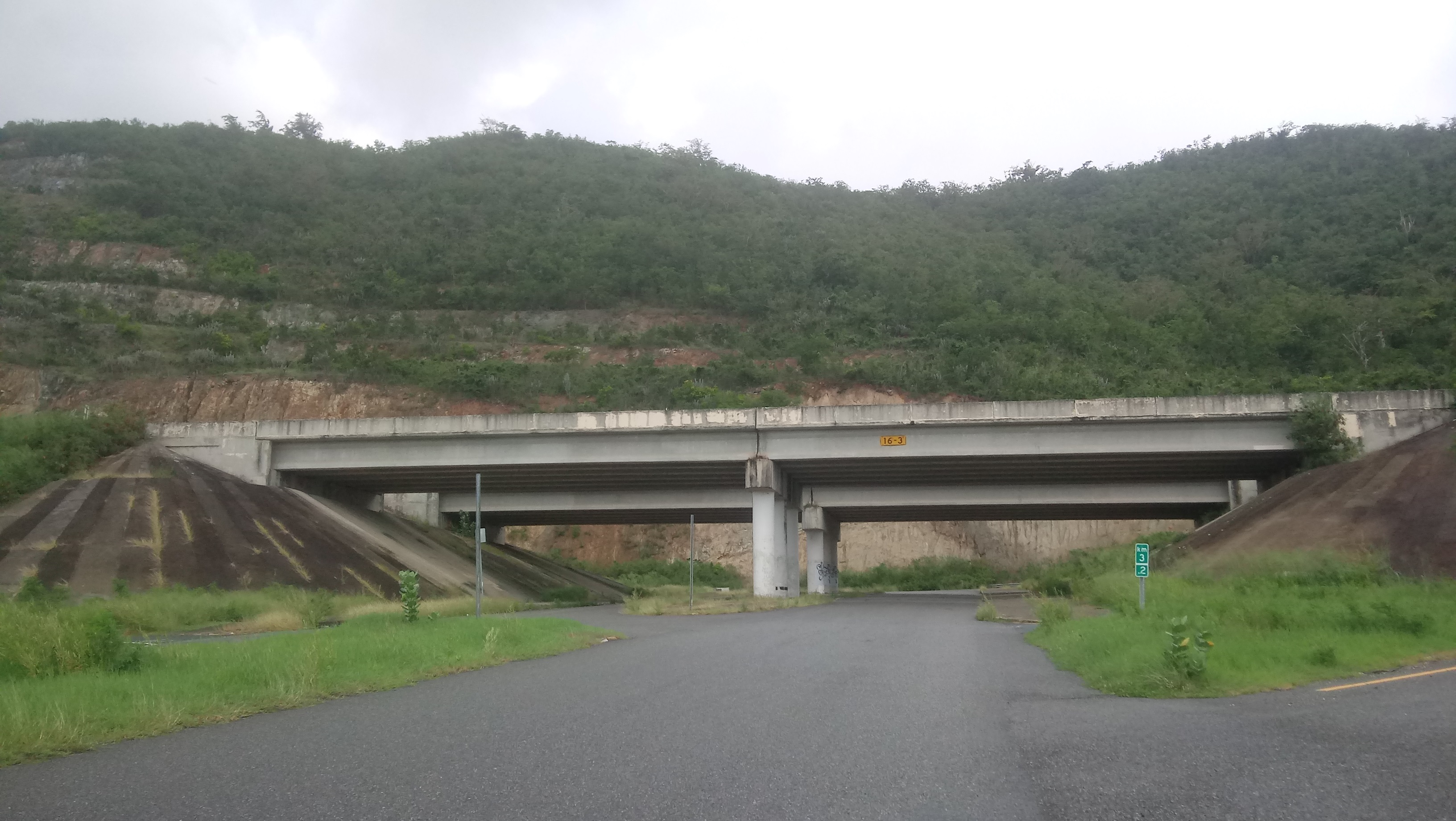
PR-53 overpass in Pozo Hondo, a barrio in Guayama

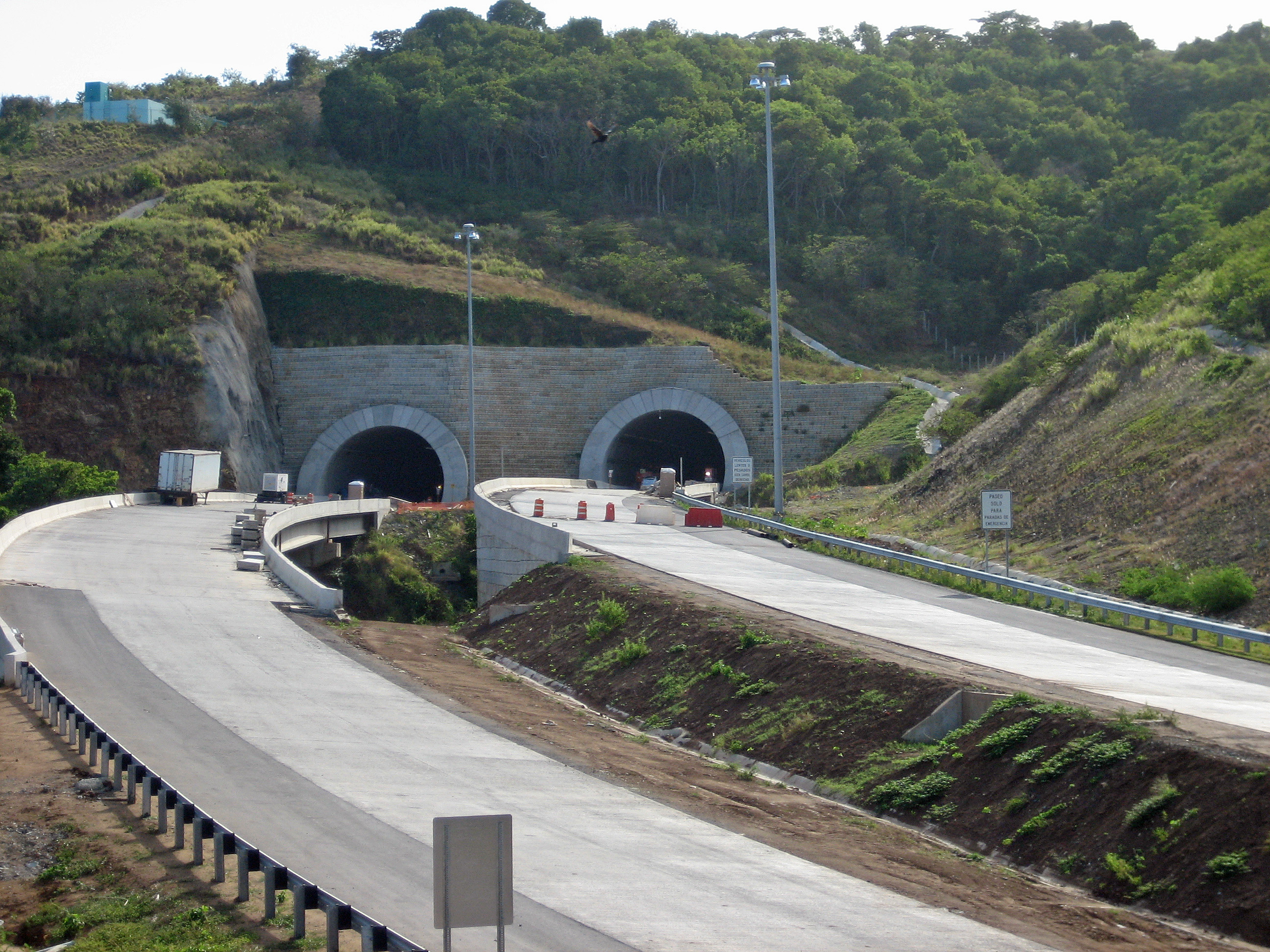
Maunabo Tunnels under construction, 2008

Three phases of the tollway have been completed: the first one was from Salinas to Guayama, which is about 7.5 miles (12.1 km) long (milepost 83 to 95 km), the second from Fajardo to Yabucoa at 28 mi (45 km) (This includes an incomplete bridge in Yabucoa that does not fall into the high-speed highway classification in the interstate system as it is only one lane per direction and will require the addition of an additional bridge or constructing a bridge over the existing bridge, as it lies in a main corn and plantain field.) Recently 1.2 miles (1.9 km), between Yabucoa and Maunabo, includes the last tunnel, Vicente Morales, was opened in October 2008. The total constructed highway at this time is 34 miles (55 km), leaving nearly 25 miles (40 km) to be constructed in Yabucoa (including the other additional tunnel) and from Maunabo to Guayama which is the longest to-be-built segment. The lanes in the Yabucoa segments were divided by painted yellow lines and no-passing zone boards, but a concrete median barrier had to be installed because some cars still passed others going slower, resulting in deadly head-on collisions; illegal night races also had deadly consequences.

PR-53 is the third tollway with the heavy traffic in Puerto Rico, and very few congestion jams have been reported. PR-53 does not enter highly populated towns (none of them are over 100,000; the largest are Fajardo, Humacao and Guayama) and is not close to increase its traffic due to the fact that most of the population in the east part of Puerto Rico live in the San Juan metro area, Caguas and Cayey, cities where PR-53 makes no appearance; and the main traffic in Humacao is mostly located on the PR-30 and PR-60 highways. The center/business area of Humacao is accessed via PR-30 and PR-60, not by PR-53. Because of this, PR-53 has no more than two lanes per direction in the constructed segments and will probably have no more than two lanes per direction in the entire length.

PR-53 is also prone to flooding in the areas near Naguabo and Fajardo: during heavy rains, it is sometimes closed to traffic. There are current proposals to convert PR-3 from Rio Grande to Fajardo into a freeway to provide a controlled-access route between PR-53's northern terminus and the second phase of PR-66. At the rate of construction, the entire PR-53 corridor might be completed within the next ten years. The first segment of PR-53 was opened in 1994; from Fajardo to Ceiba, in 1994, and from Ceiba to Humacao, in 1997, except between exit 13 and 17 in summer 2002.

Eastern segments

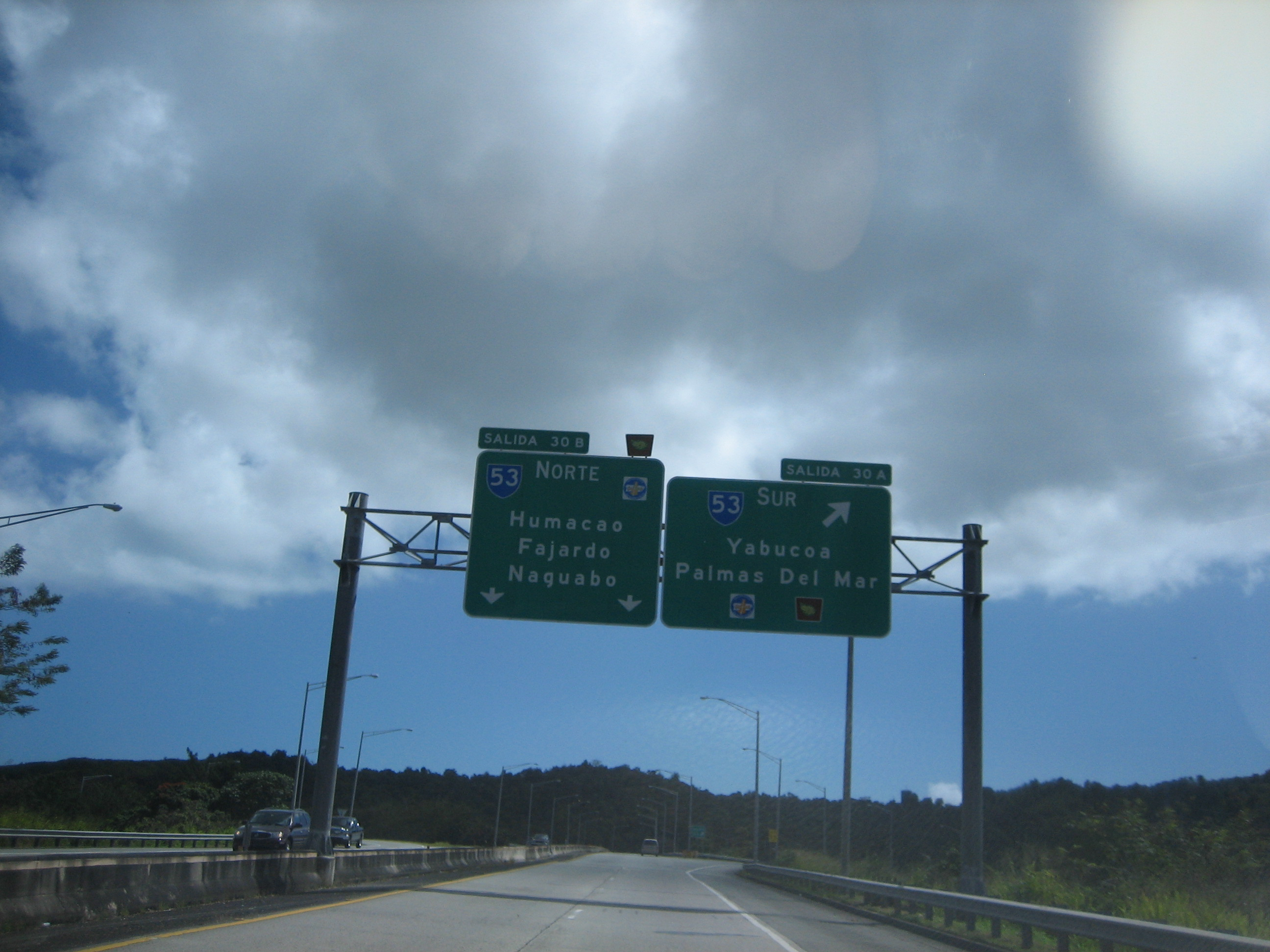
Eastern terminus of the PR-30 freeway with the PR-53 interchange

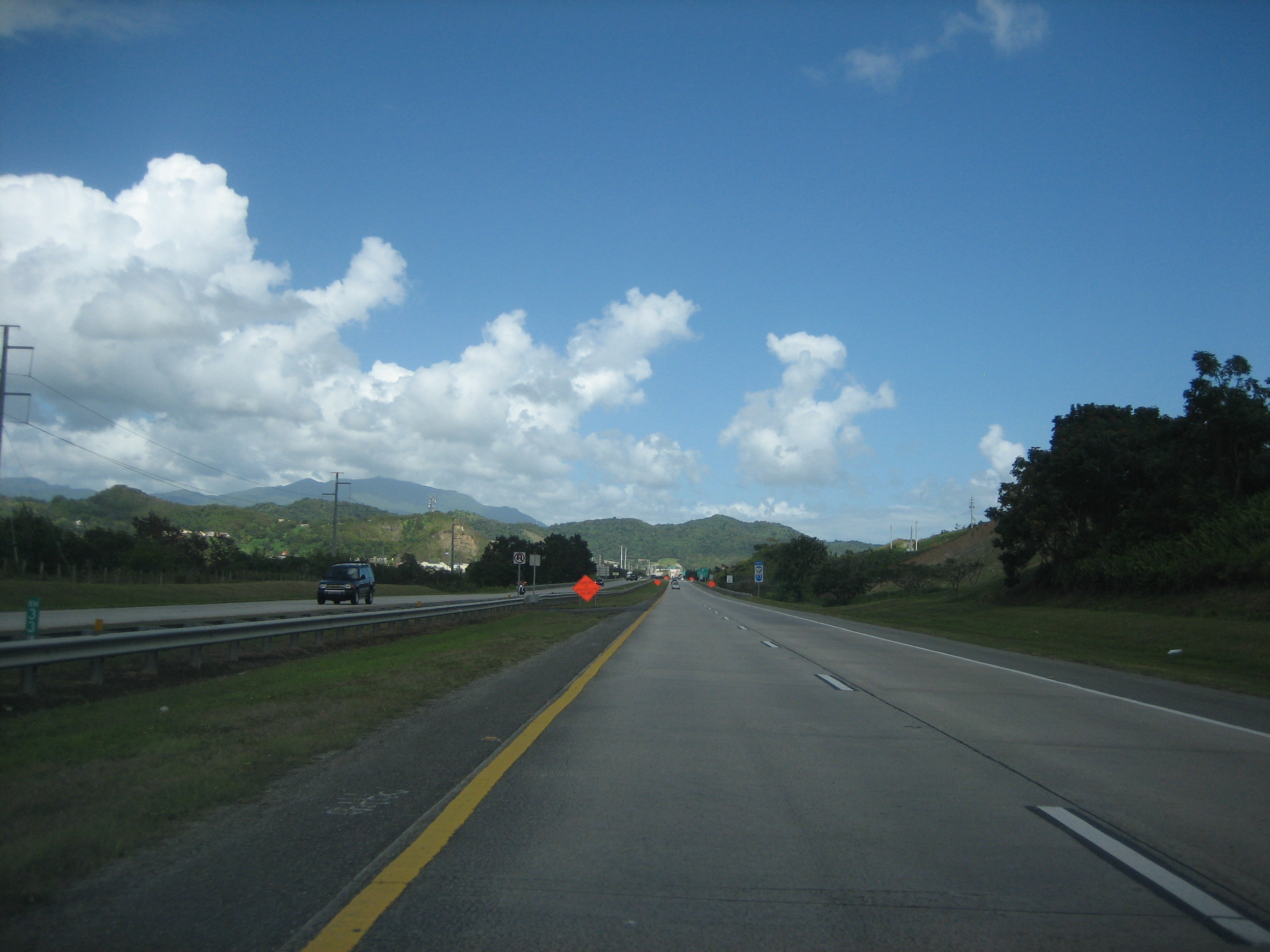
PR-53 in Humacao heading towards El Yunque

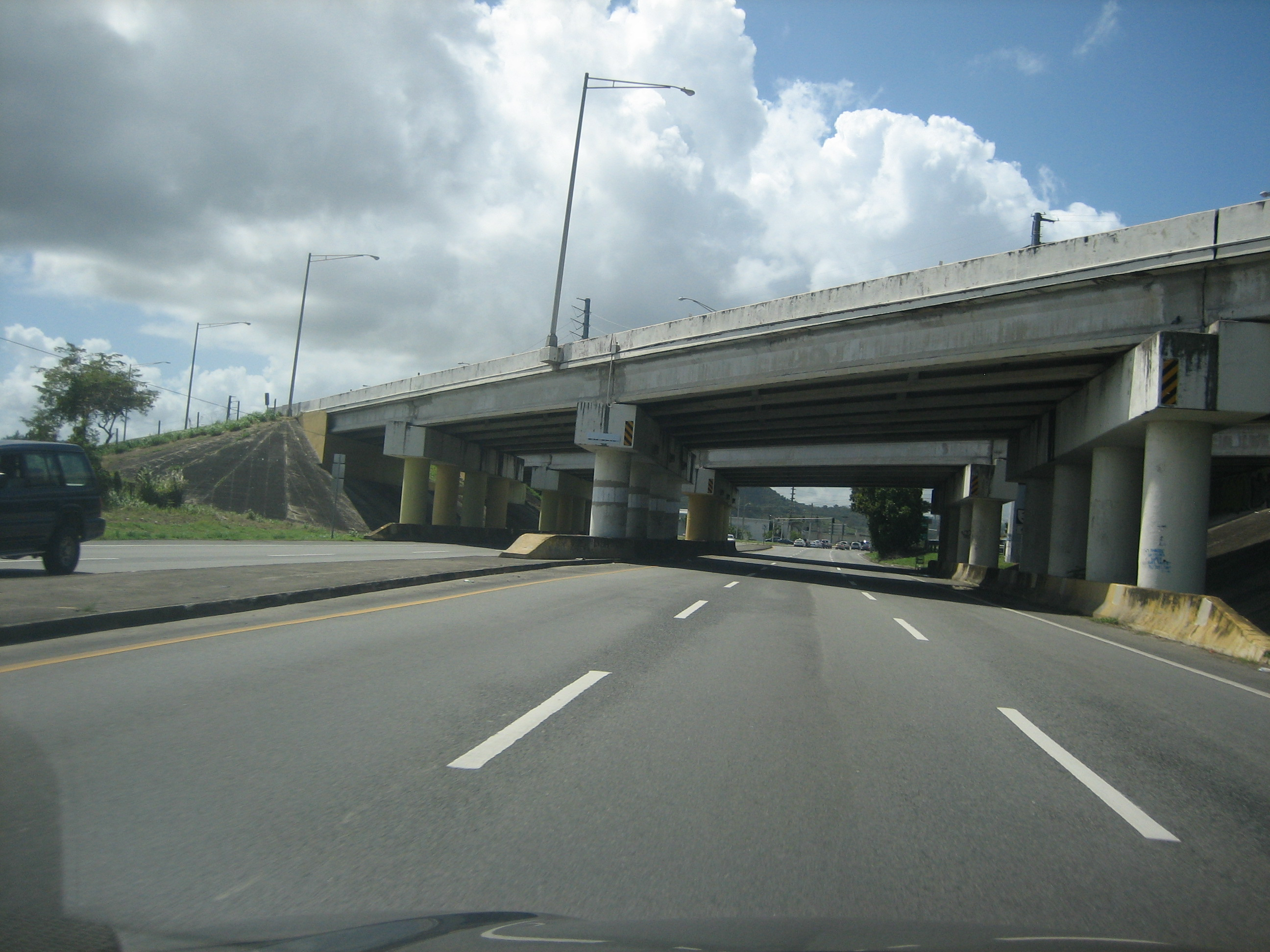
PR-53 freeway overpass over PR-3 in Humacao at exit 31

== Tolls ==
| Location | Toll | Direction | AutoExpreso acceptance | AutoExpreso replenishment (R) lane |
|---|---|---|---|---|
| Húcar | $0.75 | Two-way | | |
| Guayama | $0.70 | Two-way | | |
| Humacao Sur | $0.75 | Two-way | | (southbound only) |
| Humacao Norte | $0.75 | Two-way | | (northbound only) |
| Ceiba | $0.75 | Two-way | | (southbound only) |

== Exit list ==
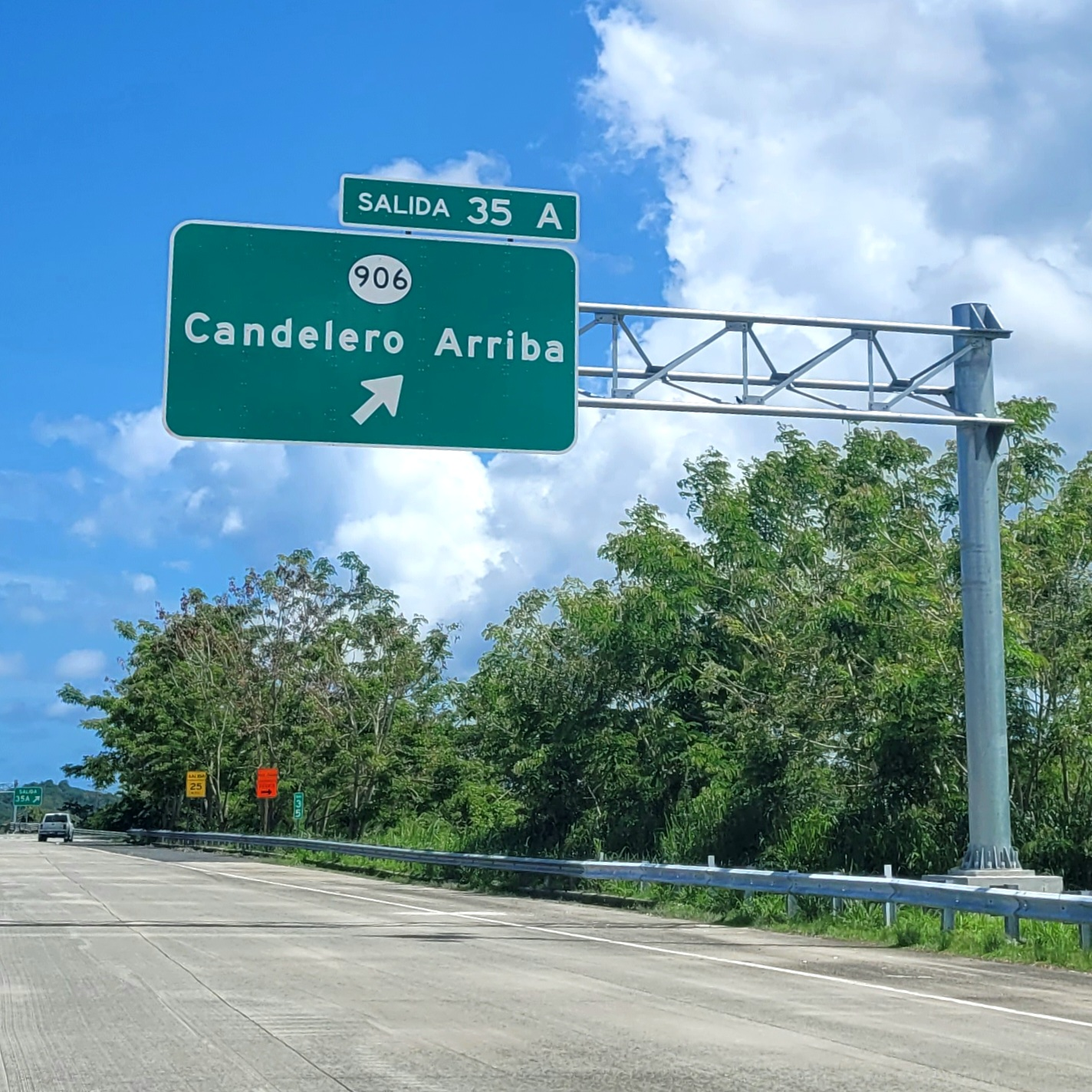
PR-53 south at exit 35A to PR-906 west in Humacao

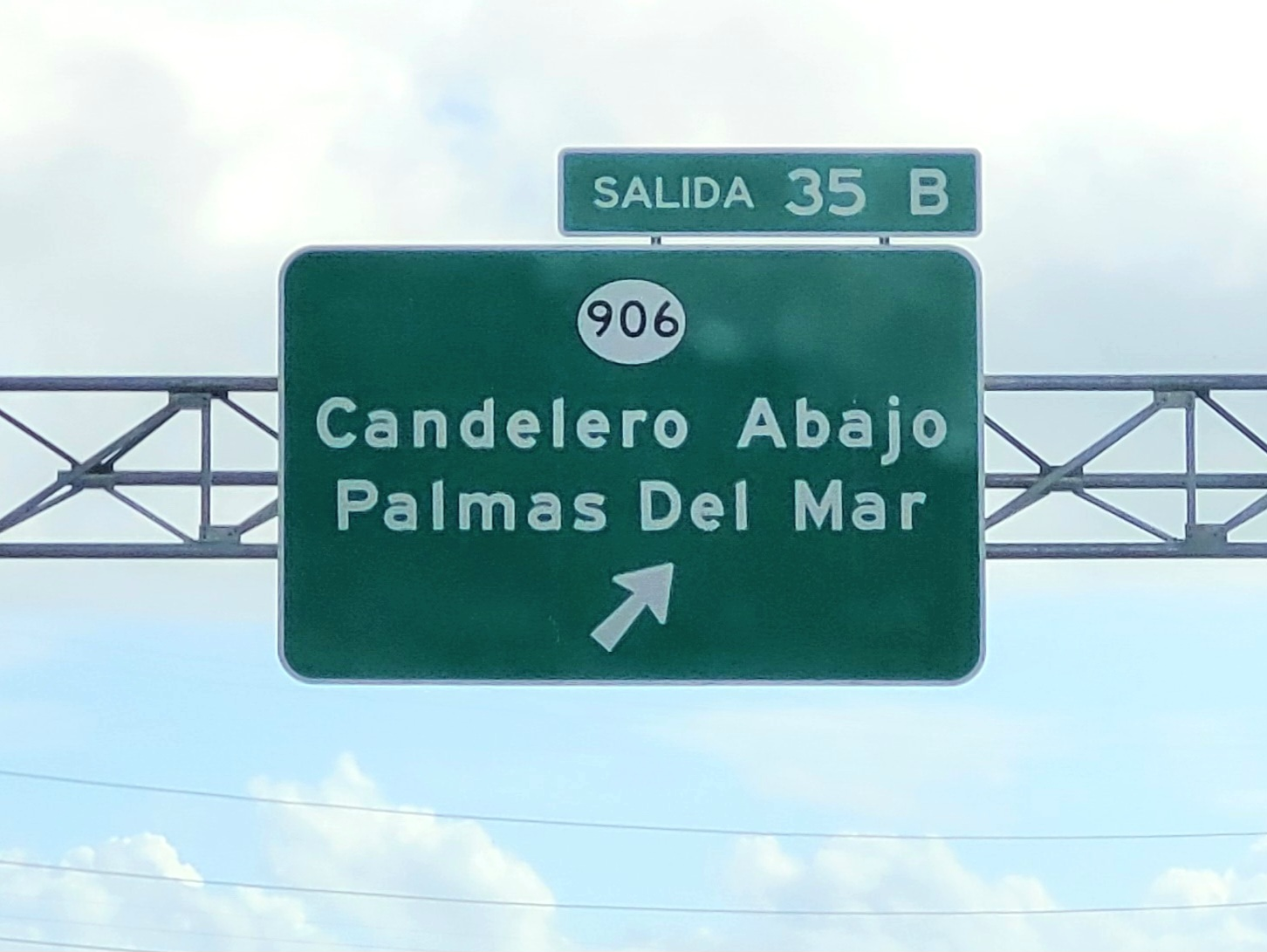
PR-53 south at exit 35B to PR-906 east in Humacao

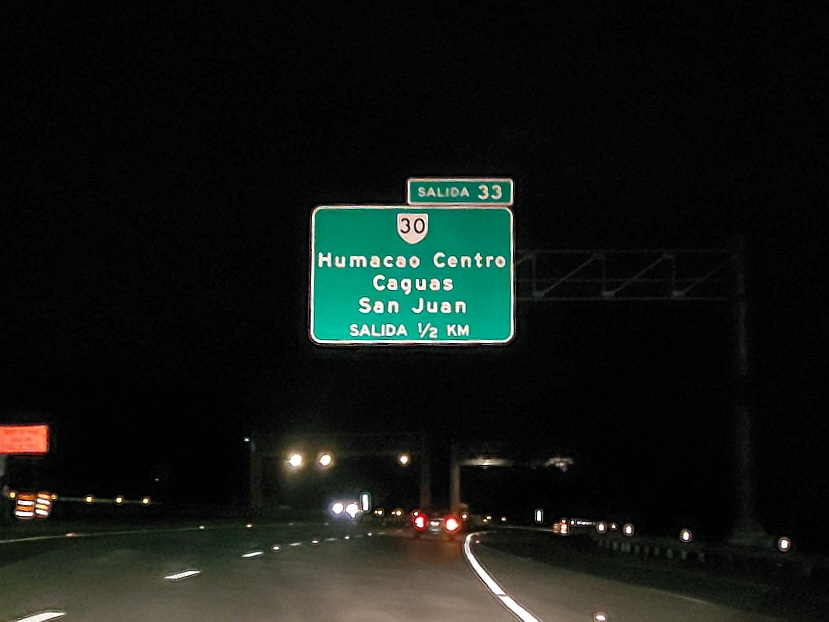
PR-53 north approaching exit 33 to the eastern terminus of PR-30 in Humacao

| Municipality | Location | km | mi | Exit | Destinations | Notes |
|---|---|---|---|---|---|---|
| Salinas | Lapa | 94.0 | 58.4 | — | PR-52 (PRI-1 / Autopista Luis A. Ferré) – Ponce, San Juan | Southern terminus of PR-53; PR-52 exits 60 and 61 |
| Salinas | Lapa | 93.1 | 57.8 | Húcar Toll Plaza | | |
| Salinas | Aguirre | 90.8– 90.7 | 56.4– 56.4 | 91 | PR-706 – Aguirre | |
| Guayama | Pozo Hondo | 87.0– 86.9 | 54.1– 54.0 | 87 | PR-713 – Villodas, Cimarrona | |
| Guayama | Pozo Hondo | 83.5 | 51.9 | 83 | PR-7707 (Carretera Johnny Albino) – Jobos | |
| Guayama | Pozo Hondo | 82.1 | 51.0 | Guayama Toll Plaza | | |
| Guayama | Palmas | 80.8 | 50.2 | | PR-54 east (Avenida Pedro Albizu Campos) – Guayama, Arroyo, Patillas | Western terminus of PR-54 |
Temporary gap in PR-53
| Arroyo | Palmas | 0.0 (Note: Kilometer markers in the Arroyo–Patillas segment have not been adjusted to those of the rest of PR-53.) | 0.0 | | PR-3 – Arroyo, Patillas | At-grade T junction |
| Patillas | Cacao Bajo | 1.0 | 0.62 | | Patillas Airport | At-grade T junction, closed |
| Patillas | Pollos | 3.0 | 1.9 | — | PR-3 – Patillas, Maunabo | Incomplete Diamond interchange. Mainline stub exist for a future extension. |
Temporary gap in PR-53
| Maunabo | Emajagua | 51.7 | 32.1 | | PR-901 – Yabucoa, Maunabo | At-grade T junction |
| Maunabo | Emajagua | 50.4– 49.8 | 31.3– 30.9 | Túnel Vicente Morales Lebrón | | |
| Maunabo | Emajagua | 49.5 | 30.8 | | PR-901 – Yabucoa, Maunabo | At-grade T junction |
Temporary gap in PR-53
| Yabucoa | Camino Nuevo | 43.9 | 27.3 | | PR-9914 to PR-901 – Yabucoa, Maunabo | Currently as At-grade Three-way junction. Diamond interchange and roundabout under construction for future extension. |
| Yabucoa | Río Guayanés and Río del Ingenio | 42.9– 40.3 | 26.7– 25.0 | Puente Ramón Luis Cruz Dávila | | |
| Yabucoa | Playa | 40.0 | 24.9 | 40 | PR-906 (Avenida Luis M. Castro Díaz) – Yabucoa, Playa | South end of 4 lanes Interstate Highway standards to 2 lanes divided freeway. |
| Humacao | Candelero Abajo–Buena Vista line | 35.5 | 22.1 | 35 | PR-906 (Avenida Luis M. Castro Díaz) – Palmas del Mar, Candelero Abajo | Southbound exits signed 35A (north) and 35B (south) |
| Humacao | Buena Vista | 34.8 | 21.6 | Humacao Sur Toll Plaza | | |
| Humacao | Buena Vista | 33.8 | 21.0 | 33 | PR-30 west (Expreso Cruz Ortiz Stella) – Humacao Centro, Humacao Oeste, Caguas, San Juan | |
| Humacao | Río Abajo | 31.2 | 19.4 | 31 | PR-3 – Humacao Centro, Punta Santiago, Junquito | |
| Humacao | Antón Ruíz | 28.3 | 17.6 | Humacao Norte Toll Plaza | | |
| Humacao | Antón Ruíz | 25.9 | 16.1 | 26 | To PR-927 – Antón Ruíz, Mambiche | |
| Naguabo | Río Blanco | 22.2 | 13.8 | 22 | PR-31 – Juncos, Río Blanco | Southbound exit and northbound entrance |
| Naguabo | Maizales | 20.8– 20.7 | 12.9– 12.9 | 21 | PR-970 – Naguabo Oeste, Maizales | |
| Naguabo | Duque | 18.3 | 11.4 | 18 | PR-205 to PR-31 – Naguabo Centro | |
| Naguabo | Duque–Mariana line | 17.1 | 10.6 | 17 | PR-971 – Naguabo Este, Duque | Southbound exit only |
| Naguabo | Mariana | 13.6 | 8.5 | 13 | PR-3 / PR-973 – Playa de Naguabo, Duque, Mariana | |
| Ceiba | Quebrada Seca | 10.3 | 6.4 | 10 | PR-3 – Roosevelt Roads, Aguas Claras | |
| Ceiba | Ceiba barrio-pueblo | 5.9– 5.8 | 3.7– 3.6 | 6 | PR-978 – Ceiba Sur, Roosevelt Roads | |
| Ceiba | Saco | 4.9 | 3.0 | 5 | PR-975 – Ceiba Norte, Ceiba Centro | |
| Ceiba | Machos | 4.1 | 2.5 | Ceiba Toll Plaza | | |
| Fajardo | Quebrada Vueltas | 1.8 | 1.1 | 2 | To PR-3 – Demajagua, Puerto del Rey | Access to José Aponte de la Torre Airport |
| Fajardo | Quebrada Vueltas | 0.0 | 0.0 | | PR-3 (PRI-3) to PR-194 – Fajardo, Carolina | Northern terminus of PR-53. Interstate PR3 continues northwestbound via PR-3 as an At-grade traffic lighted expressway. |
1.000 mi = 1.609 km; 1.000 km = 0.621 mi: Closed/former; Incomplete access; Tolled; Route transition; Unopened

== See also ==
- Interstate Highways in Puerto Rico
- José Celso Barbosa
