= Playa, Yabucoa, Puerto Rico =

Barrio of Puerto Rico

Playa
- Barrio
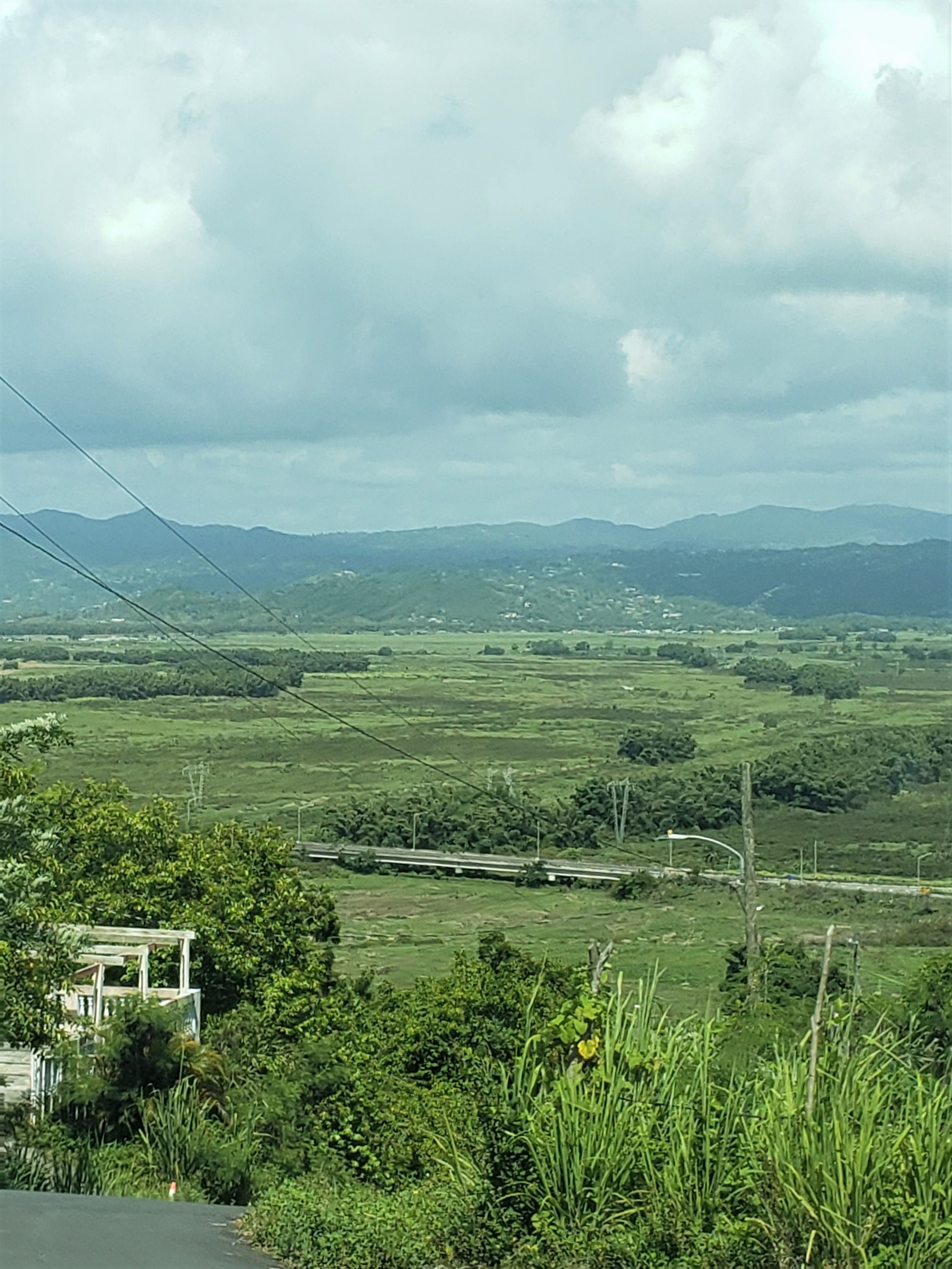
- PR-53 and mountains from Sector El Gandular in Playa

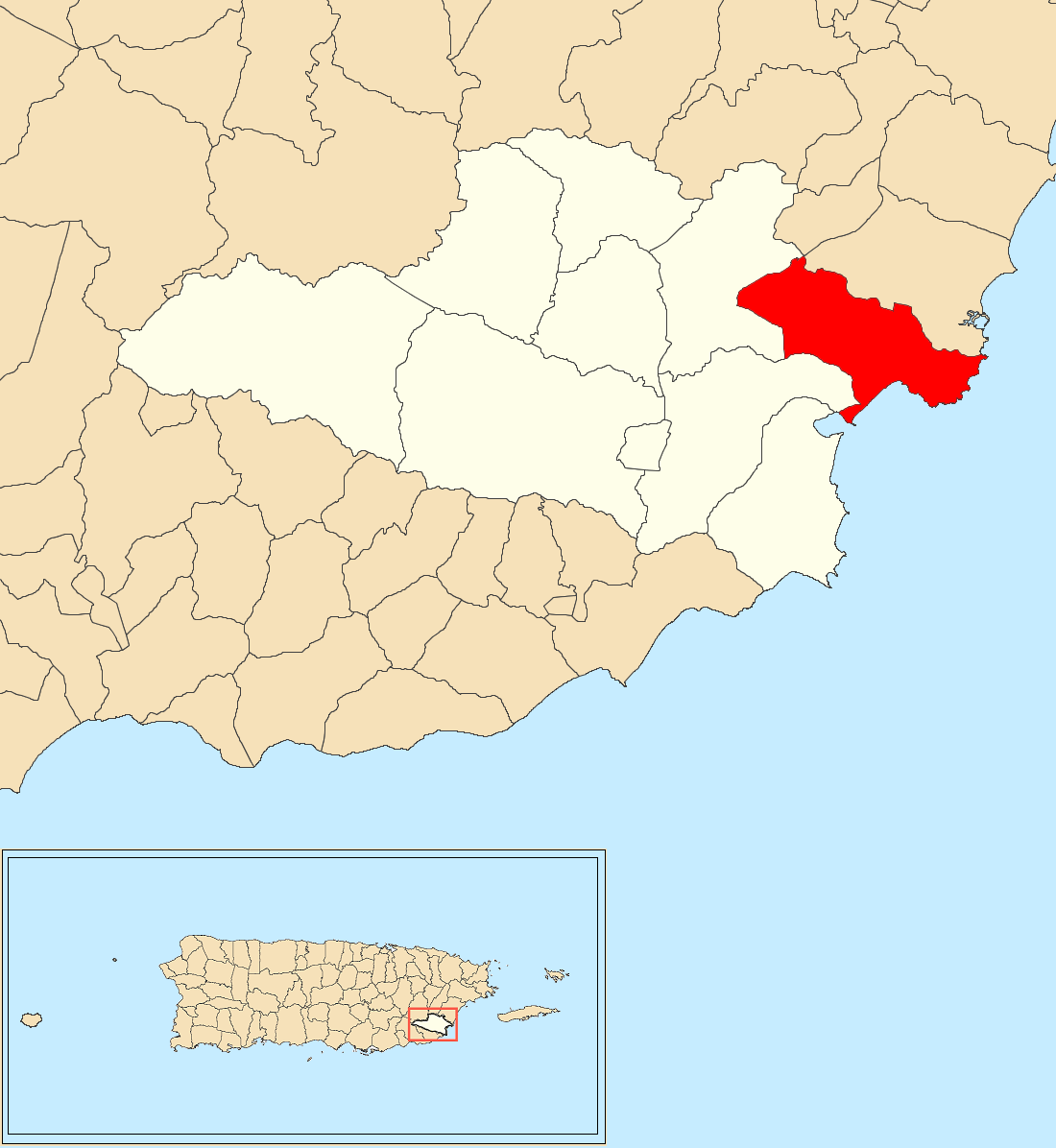
- Location of Playa within the municipality of Yabucoa shown in red

- Location of Puerto Rico
- Coordinates: 18°04′21″N 65°49′43″W
- Commonwealth: Puerto Rico
- Municipality: Yabucoa

Area
  - Total: 4.70 sq mi (12.2 km^{2})
  - Land: 4.66 sq mi (12.1 km^{2})
  - Water: 0.04 sq mi (0.10 km^{2})
- Elevation: 98 ft (30 m)

Population (2010)
  - Total: 4,915
  - Density: 1,054.7/sq mi (407.2/km^{2})
- Source: 2010 Census
- Time zone: UTC−4 (AST)
- ZIP Code: 00767
- Area code: 787/939

Playa is a barrio in the municipality of Yabucoa, Puerto Rico. Its population in 2010 was 4,915.

== History ==
Playa was in Spain's gazetteers until Puerto Rico was ceded by Spain in the aftermath of the Spanish–American War under the terms of the Treaty of Paris of 1898 and became an unincorporated territory of the United States. In 1899, the United States Department of War conducted a census of Puerto Rico finding that the population of Playa barrio was 1,016.

Back to back, Hurricane Irma and Hurricane Maria destroyed sections of Playa including the community's fishing pier in September 2017. In April, 2019 a newly constructed pier was inaugurated for the fishing community of Yabucoa.

Historical population
Census	Pop.	Note	%±
1900	1,016		—
1910	1,102		8.5%
1920	1,488		35.0%
1930	1,447		−2.8%
1940	1,434		−0.9%
1950	2,358		64.4%
1960	2,168		−8.1%
1970	2,546		17.4%
1980	2,687		5.5%
1990	3,702		37.8%
2000	4,761		28.6%
2010	4,915		3.2%
U.S. Decennial Census; 1899 (shown as 1900) 1910-1930; 1930-1950 1980-2000 2010

== Sectors ==
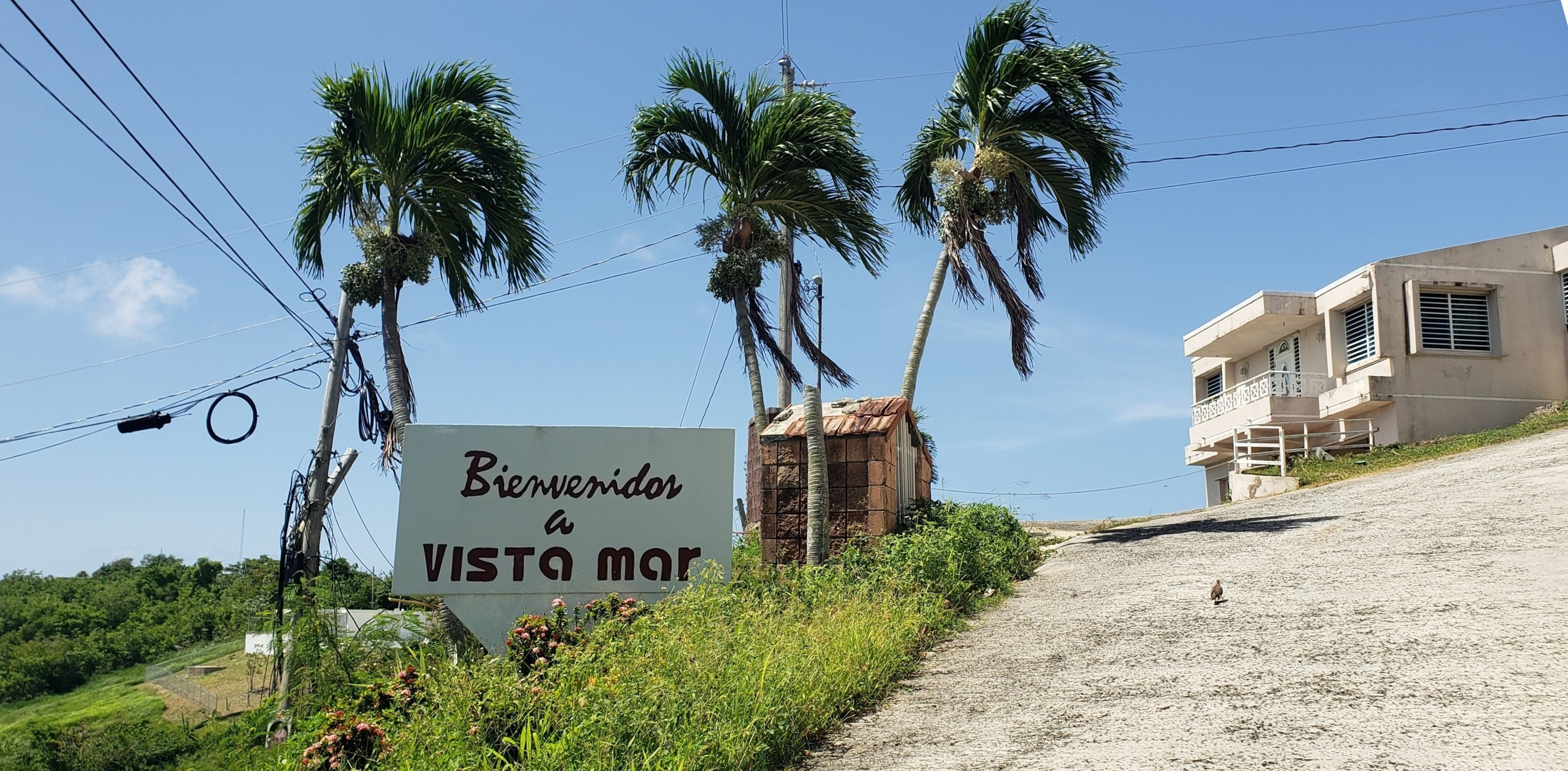
Urbanización Vista Mar in Playa barrio

Barrios (which are, in contemporary times, roughly comparable to minor civil divisions) in turn are further subdivided into smaller local populated place areas/units called sectores (sectors in English). The types of sectores may vary, from normally sector to urbanización to reparto to barriada to residencial, among others.

The following sectors are in Playa:

Sector Calambreñas, Sector El Hoyo, Sector Gandular, Sector Las Lomas, Sector Los Pavos, Sector Los Pinos, Sector Paraíso I, Sector Paraíso II, Sector Parrilla, Sector Playa Guayanés, Sector Veteranos, Sector Windy Hills, and Urbanización Vista Mar.

== See also ==
- List of communities in Puerto Rico
- List of barrios and sectors of Yabucoa, Puerto Rico
