= El Río, Las Piedras, Puerto Rico =

Barrio of Puerto Rico

El Río
- Barrio
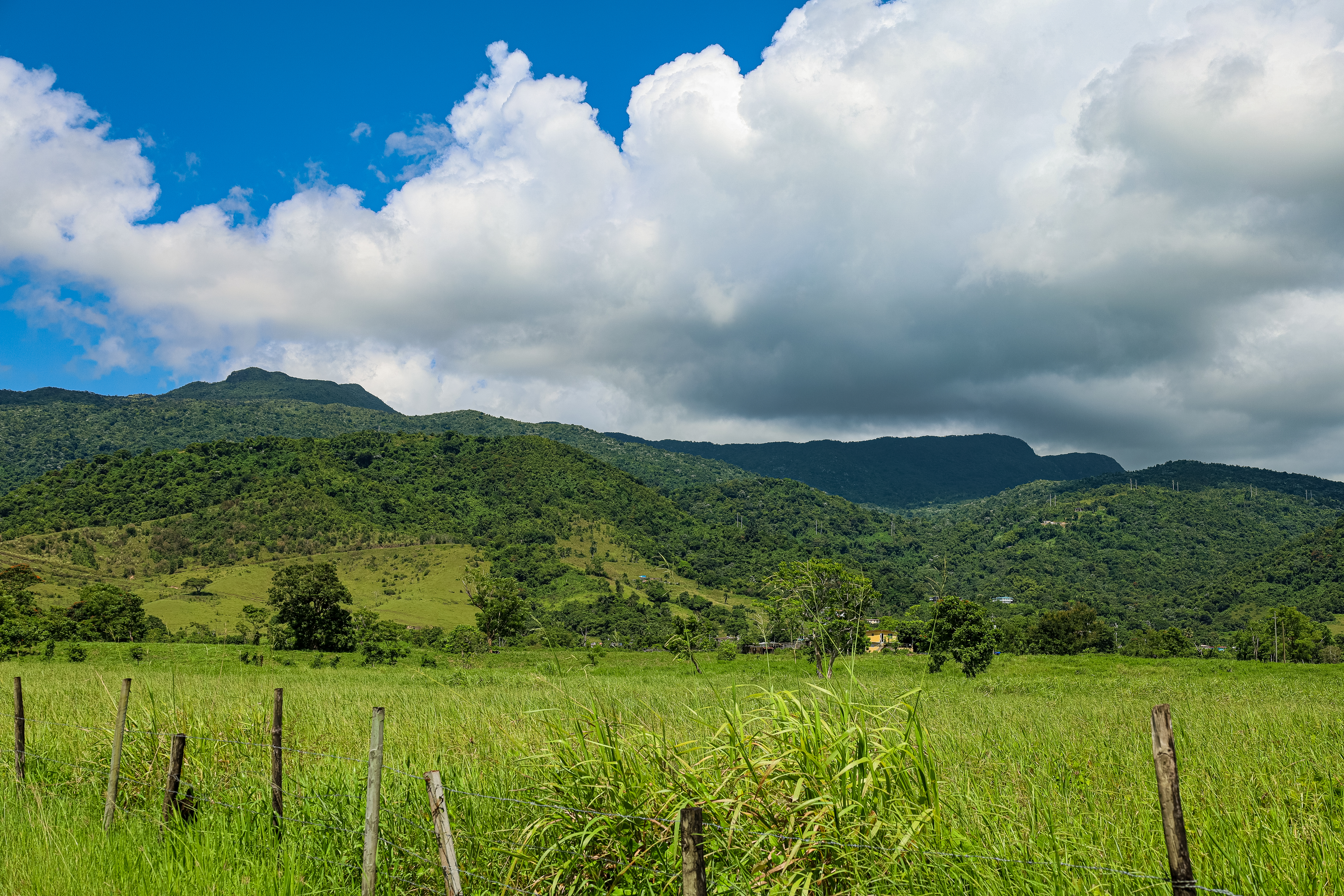
- Sierra de Luquillo in El Río

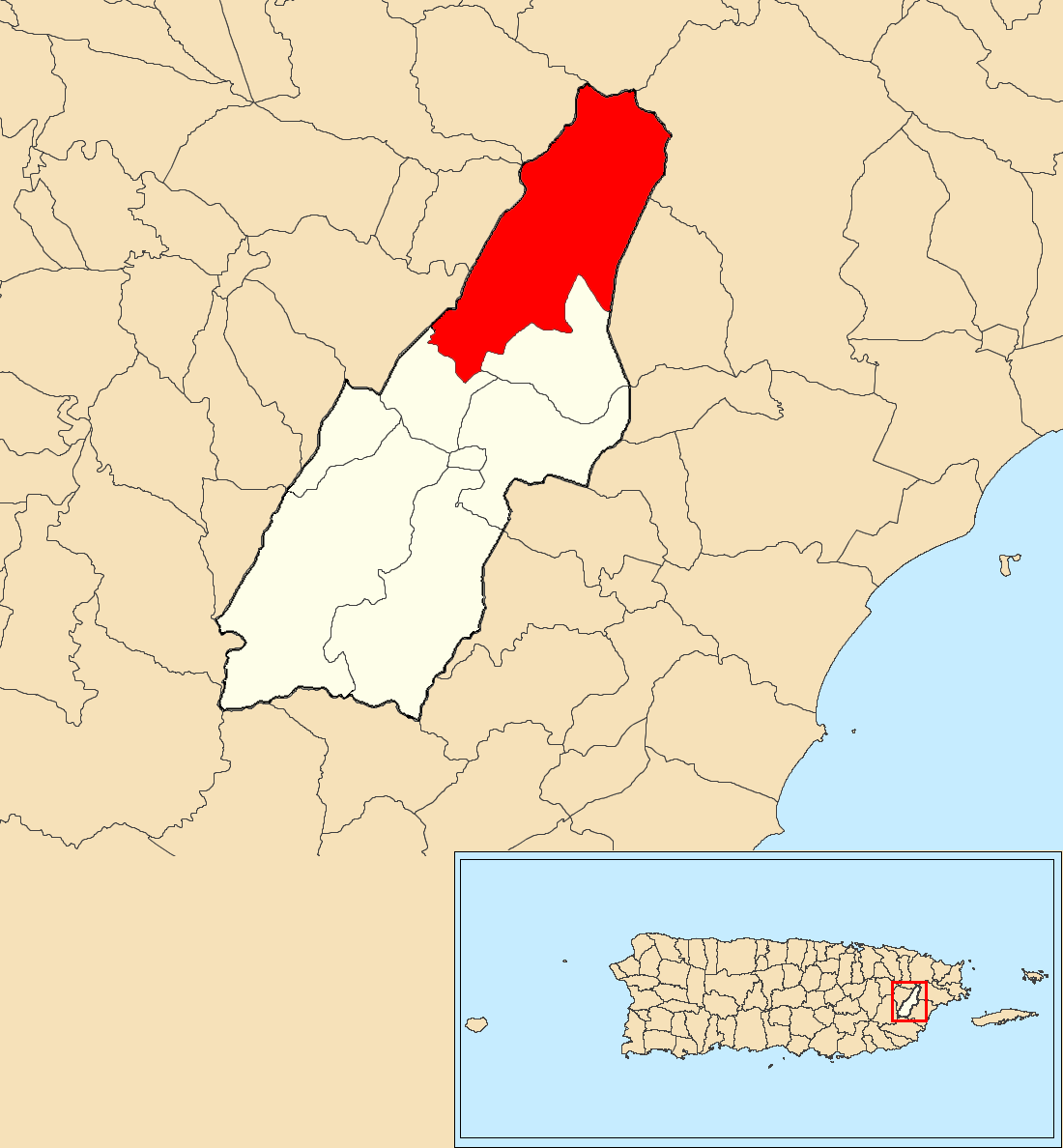
- Location of El Río within the municipality of Las Piedras shown in red

- Location of Puerto Rico
- Coordinates: 18°14′17″N 65°50′42″W
- Commonwealth: Puerto Rico
- Municipality: Las Piedras

Area
  - Total: 8.84 sq mi (22.9 km^{2})
  - Land: 8.84 sq mi (22.9 km^{2})
  - Water: 0 sq mi (0 km^{2})
- Elevation: 525 ft (160 m)

Population (2010)
  - Total: 5,096
  - Density: 576.5/sq mi (222.6/km^{2})
- Source: 2010 Census
- Time zone: UTC−4 (AST)
- ZIP Code: 00771
- Area code: 787/939

El Río is a barrio in the municipality of Las Piedras, Puerto Rico. Its population in 2010 was 5,096.

== History ==
El Río was in Spain's gazetteers until Puerto Rico was ceded by Spain in the aftermath of the Spanish–American War under the terms of the Treaty of Paris of 1898 and became an unincorporated territory of the United States. In 1899, the United States Department of War conducted a census of Puerto Rico finding that the population of El Río barrio was 2,150.

Historical population
Census	Pop.	Note	%±
1900	2,150		—
1910	2,423		12.7%
1920	2,065		−14.8%
1930	2,850		38.0%
1940	2,380		−16.5%
1950	2,817		18.4%
1960	2,980		5.8%
1970	2,701		−9.4%
1980	3,178		17.7%
1990	4,080		28.4%
2000	4,918		20.5%
2010	5,096		3.6%
U.S. Decennial Census; 1899 (shown as 1900) 1910-1930; 1930-1950 1980-2000 2010

== See also ==
- List of communities in Puerto Rico
