= Naguabo barrio-pueblo =

Historical and administrative center (seat) of Naguabo, Puerto Rico

Naguabo barrio-pueblo Pueblo de Naguabo
- Municipality Seat
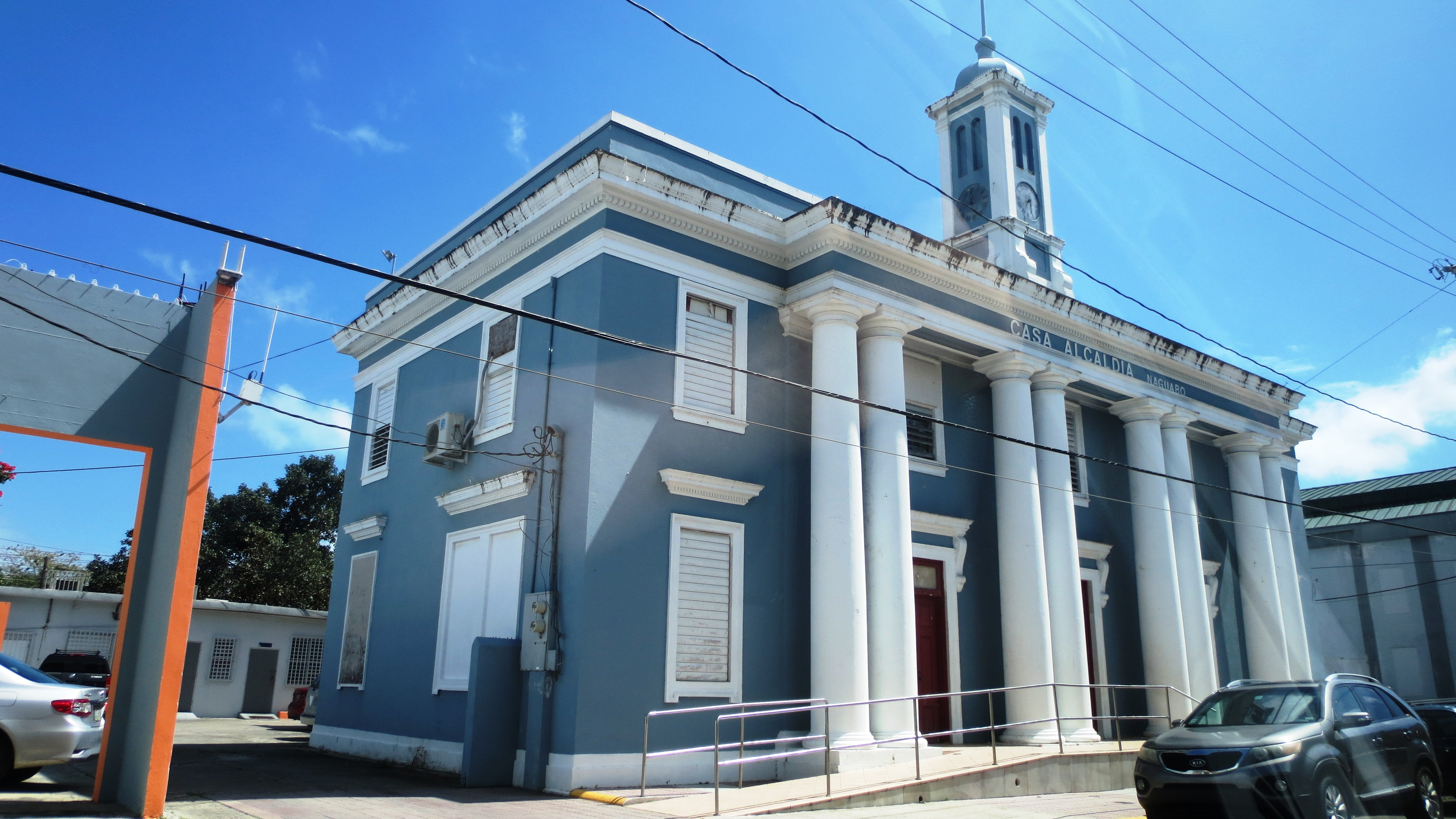
- Naguabo Town Hall

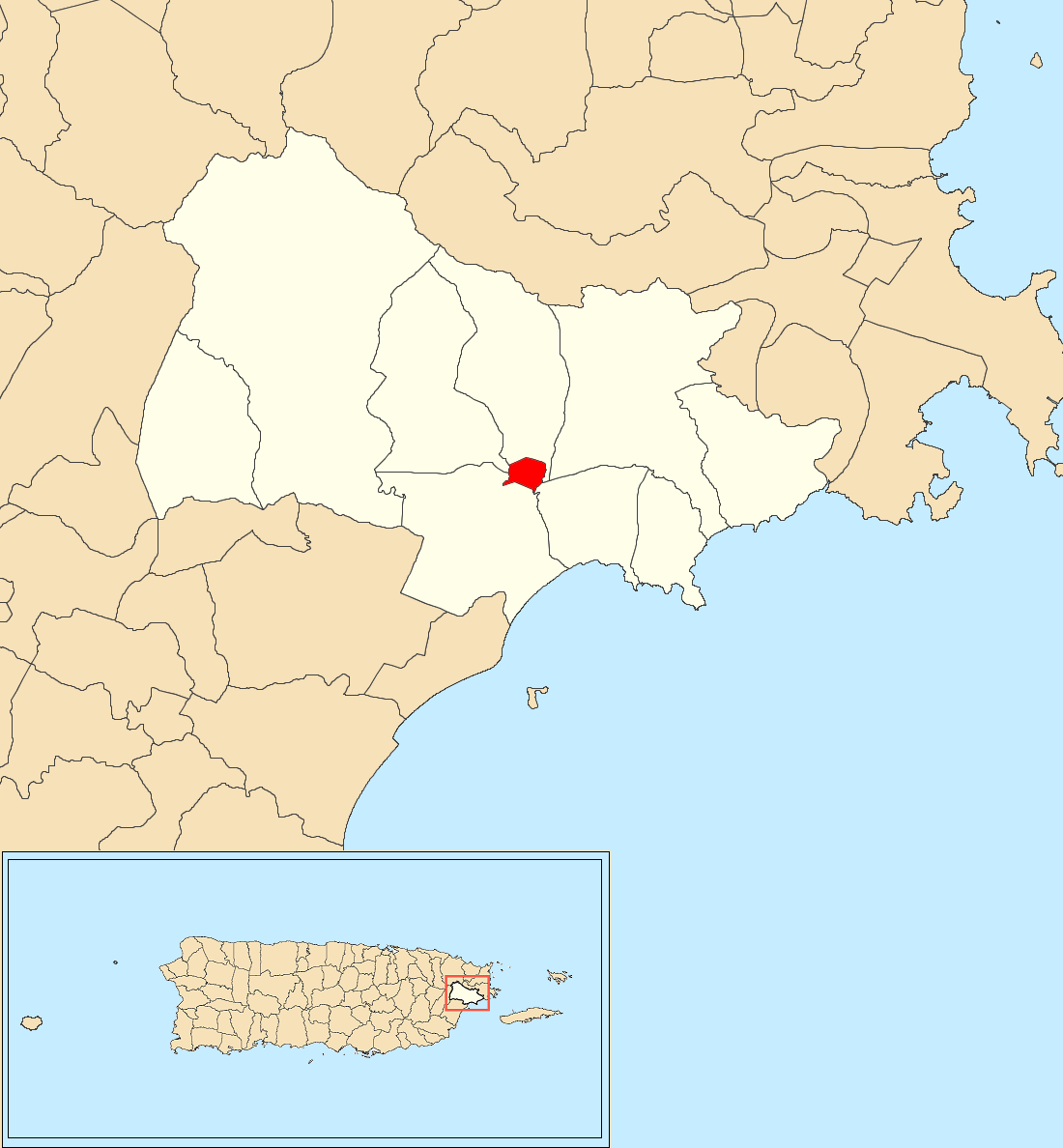
- Location of Naguabo barrio-pueblo within the municipality of Naguabo shown in red

- Location of Puerto Rico
- Coordinates: 18°12′42″N 65°44′06″W
- Commonwealth: Puerto Rico
- Municipality: Naguabo

Area
  - Total: 0.25 sq mi (0.65 km^{2})
  - Land: 0.25 sq mi (0.65 km^{2})
  - Water: 0 sq mi (0 km^{2})
- Elevation: 56 ft (17 m)

Population (2010)
  - Total: 1,514
  - Density: 6,056/sq mi (2,338/km^{2})
- Source: 2010 Census
- Time zone: UTC−4 (AST)

Naguabo barrio-pueblo is a barrio and the administrative center (seat) of Naguabo, a municipality of Puerto Rico. Its population in 2010 was 1,514.

As was customary in Spain, in Puerto Rico, the municipality has a barrio called pueblo which contains a central plaza, the municipal buildings (city hall), and a Catholic church. Fiestas patronales (patron saint festivals) are held in the central plaza every year.

Historical population
Census	Pop.	Note	%±
1900	1,812		—
1910	3,303		82.3%
1920	3,591		8.7%
1930	4,087		13.8%
1940	4,185		2.4%
1950	4,442		6.1%
1960	3,396		−23.5%
1970	0		−100.0%
1980	2,056		—
1990	1,848		−10.1%
2000	1,852		0.2%
2010	1,514		−18.3%
U.S. Decennial Census; 1899 (shown as 1900) 1910-1930; 1930-1950 1980-2000 2010

== The central plaza and its church ==
The central plaza, or square, is a place for official and unofficial recreational events and a place where people can gather and socialize from dusk to dawn. The Laws of the Indies, Spanish law, which regulated life in Puerto Rico in the early 19th century, stated the plaza's purpose was for "the parties" (celebrations, festivities) (Spanish: a propósito para las fiestas), and that the square should be proportionally large enough for the number of neighbors (Spanish: grandeza proporcionada al número de vecinos). These Spanish regulations also stated that the streets nearby should be comfortable portals for passersby, protecting them from the elements: sun and rain.

Located across the central plaza in Naguabo barrio-pueblo is the Parroquia Nuestra Señora del Rosario, a Roman Catholic church.

== History ==
Naguabo barrio-pueblo was in Spain's gazetteers until Puerto Rico was ceded by Spain in the aftermath of the Spanish–American War under the terms of the Treaty of Paris of 1898 and became an unincorporated territory of the United States. In 1899, the United States Department of War conducted a census of Puerto Rico finding that the population of Naguabo Pueblo was 1,812.

In July 2020, Federal Emergency Management Agency appropriated funds for repairs to Naguabo's plaza.

== Sectors ==
Barrios (which are, in contemporary times, roughly comparable to minor civil divisions) in turn are further subdivided into smaller local populated place areas/units called sectores (sectors in English). The types of sectores may vary, from normally sector to urbanización to reparto to barriada to residencial, among others.

The following sectors are in Naguabo barrio-pueblo:

Barriada Salsipuedes (Calle José de Diego), Calle Armando González, Calle Buenos Aires, Calles del Casco del Pueblo, Carretera Militar (from Caserío until Centro de Diagnóstico), Central El Triunfo, Edificio Cabrera, Edificio Inés María Mendoza, Residencial Ignacio Morales Dávila, Residencial Naguabo Valley, Sector Loma El Triunfo, Urbanización Brisas de Naguabo, Urbanización City Palace I, Urbanización City Palace II, Urbanización El Duque (Los Maestros), Urbanización Jardines de la Vía, and Urbanización Riberas del Río.

== Gallery ==
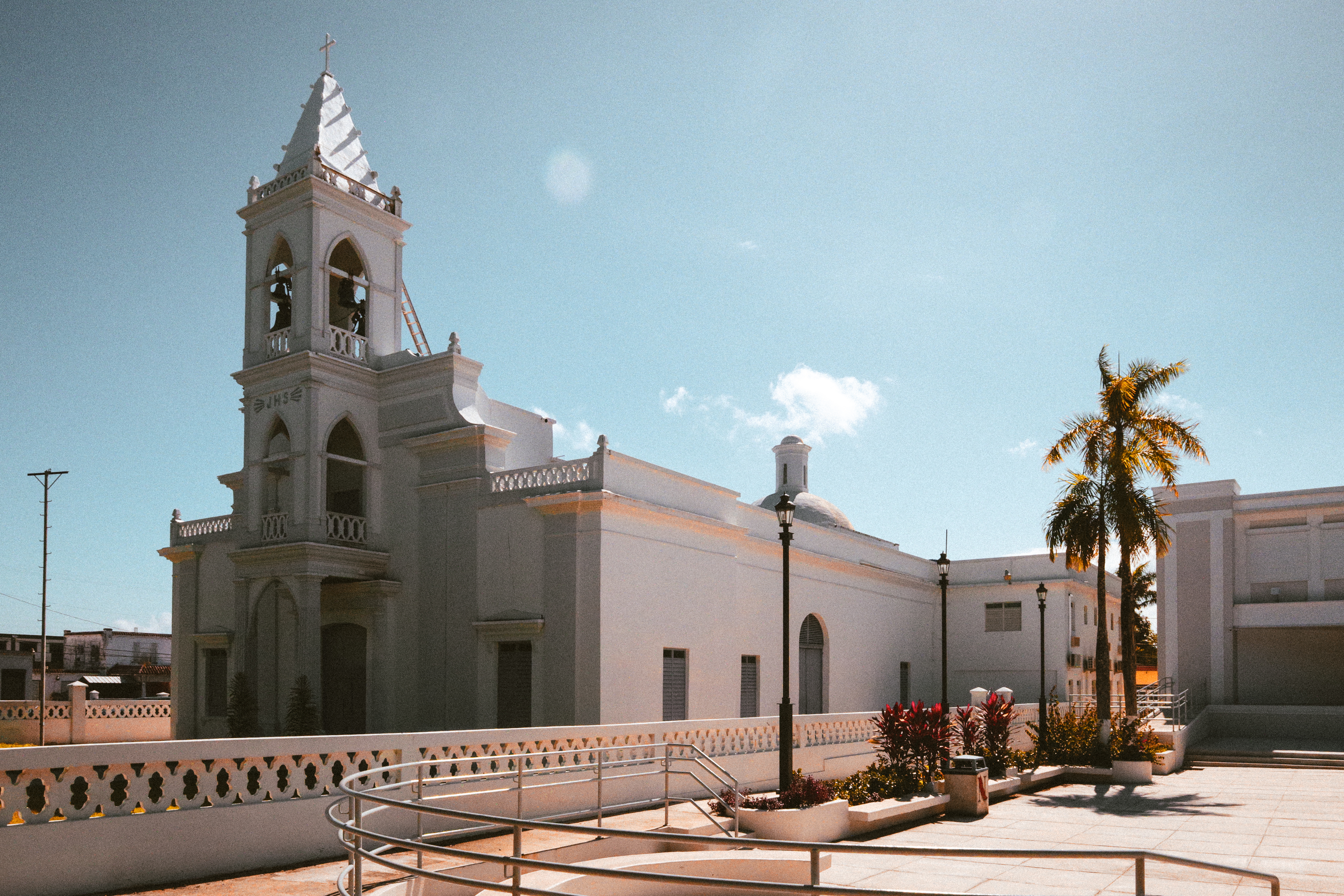
Church Nuestra Señora del Rosario of Naguabo

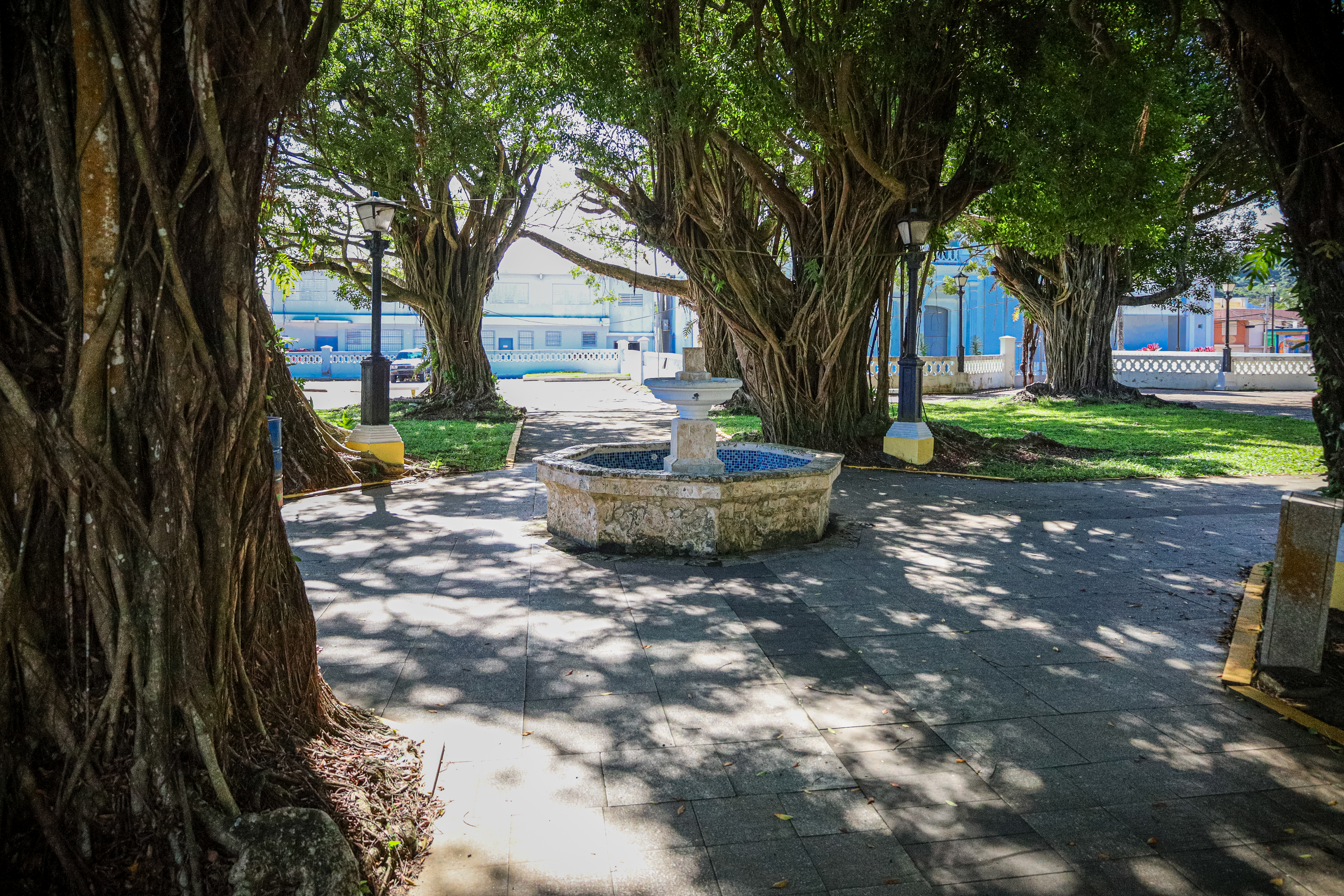
Plaza Luis Muñoz Rivera

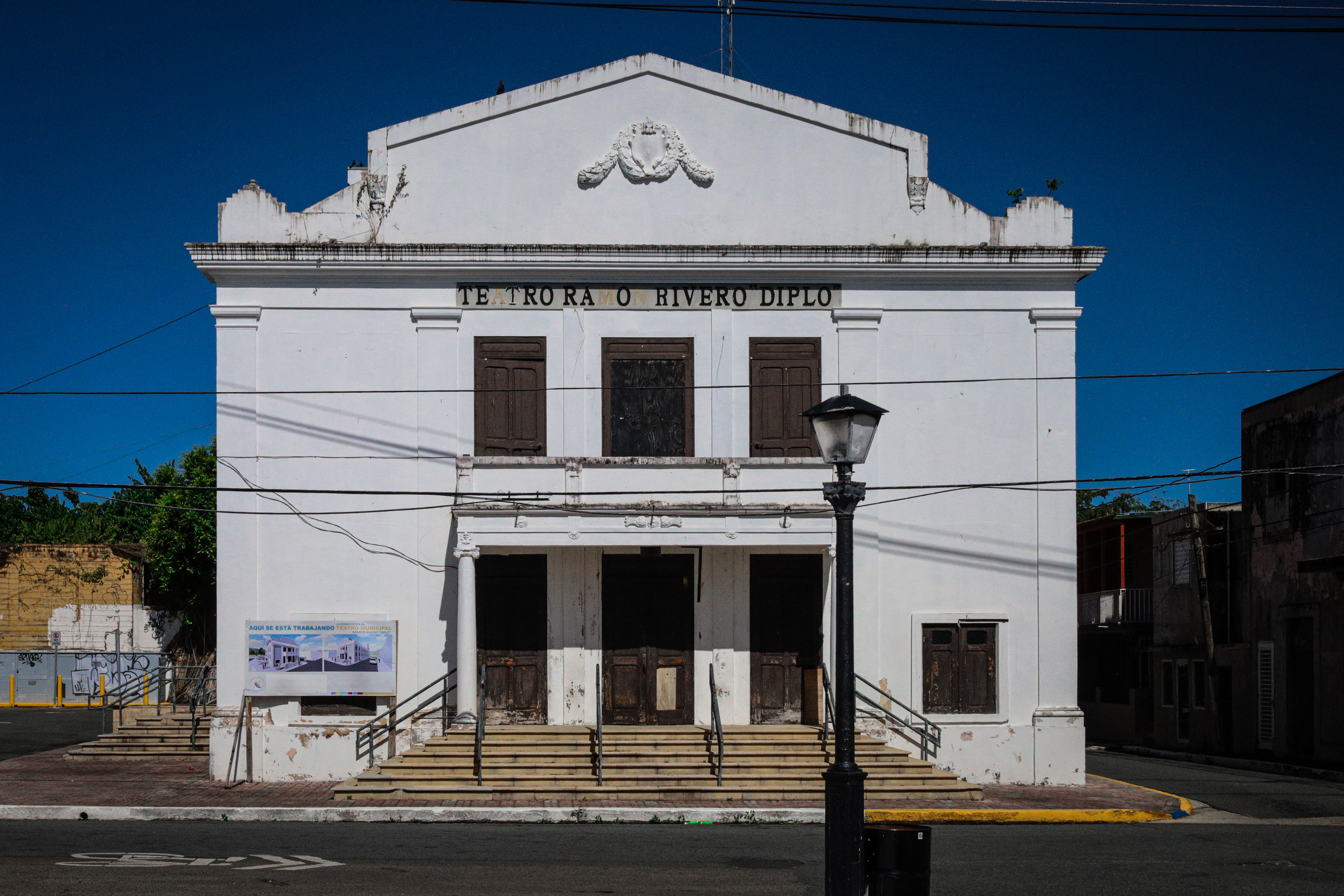
Teatro Diplo

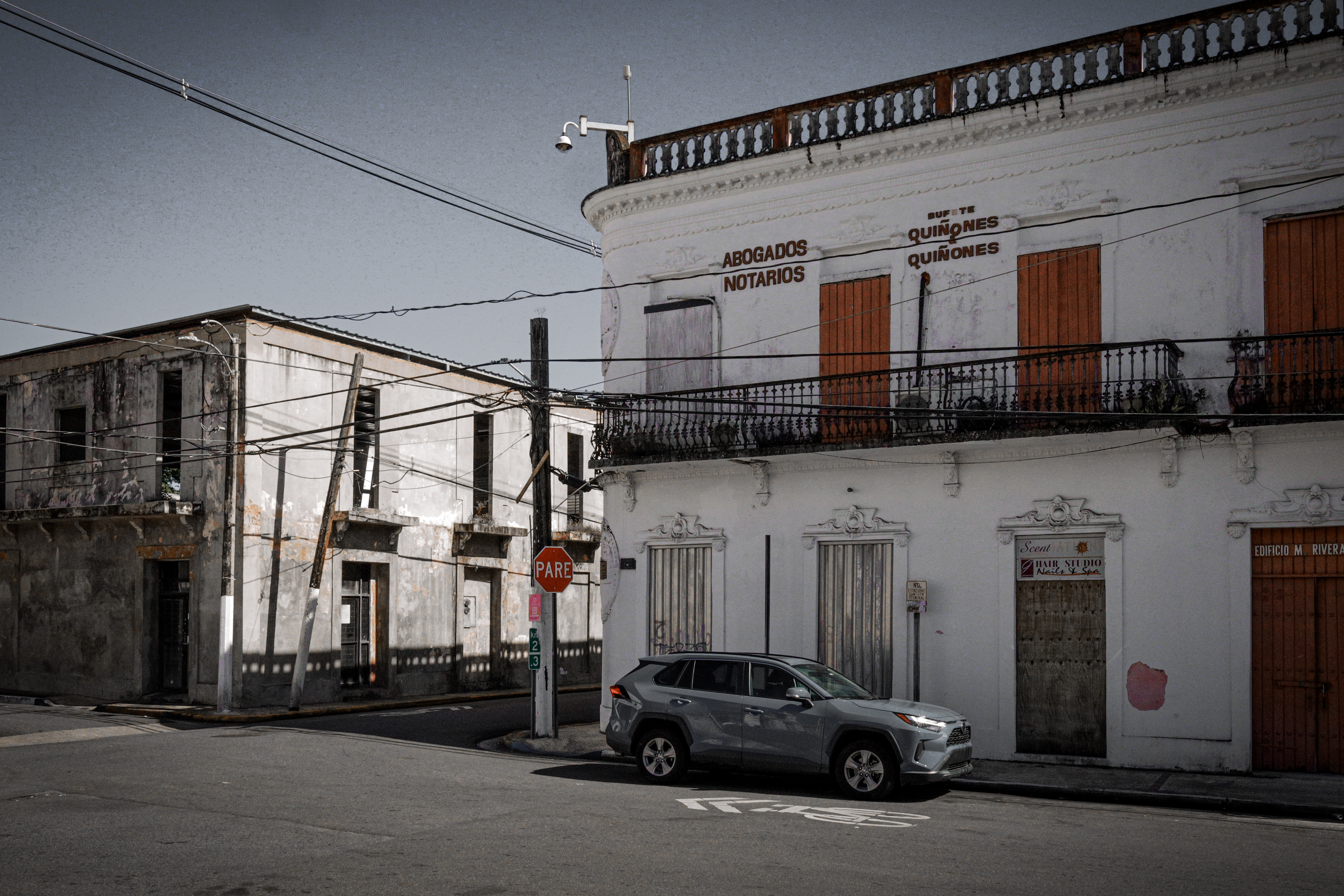
View of the pueblo in 2025.

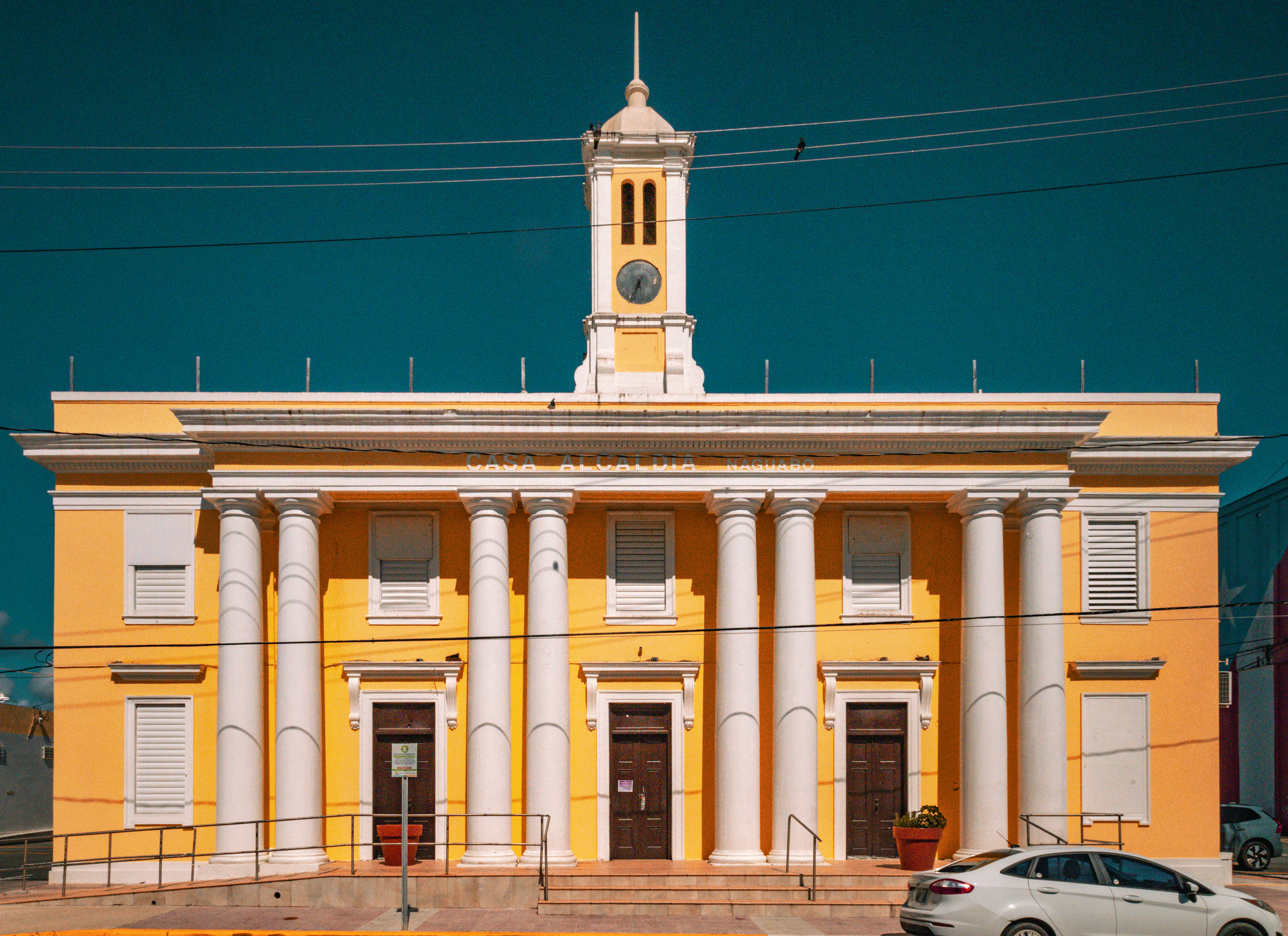
Naguabo City Hall in 2025

== See also ==
- List of communities in Puerto Rico
- List of barrios and sectors of Naguabo, Puerto Rico
