= Duque, Naguabo, Puerto Rico =

Barrio of Puerto Rico

Duque
- Barrio
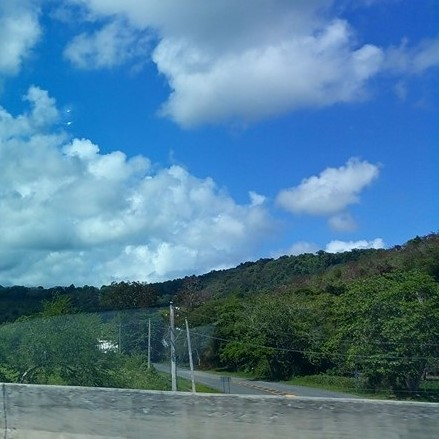
- Puerto Rico Highway 971 from Puerto Rico Highway 53 between Duque and Maizales

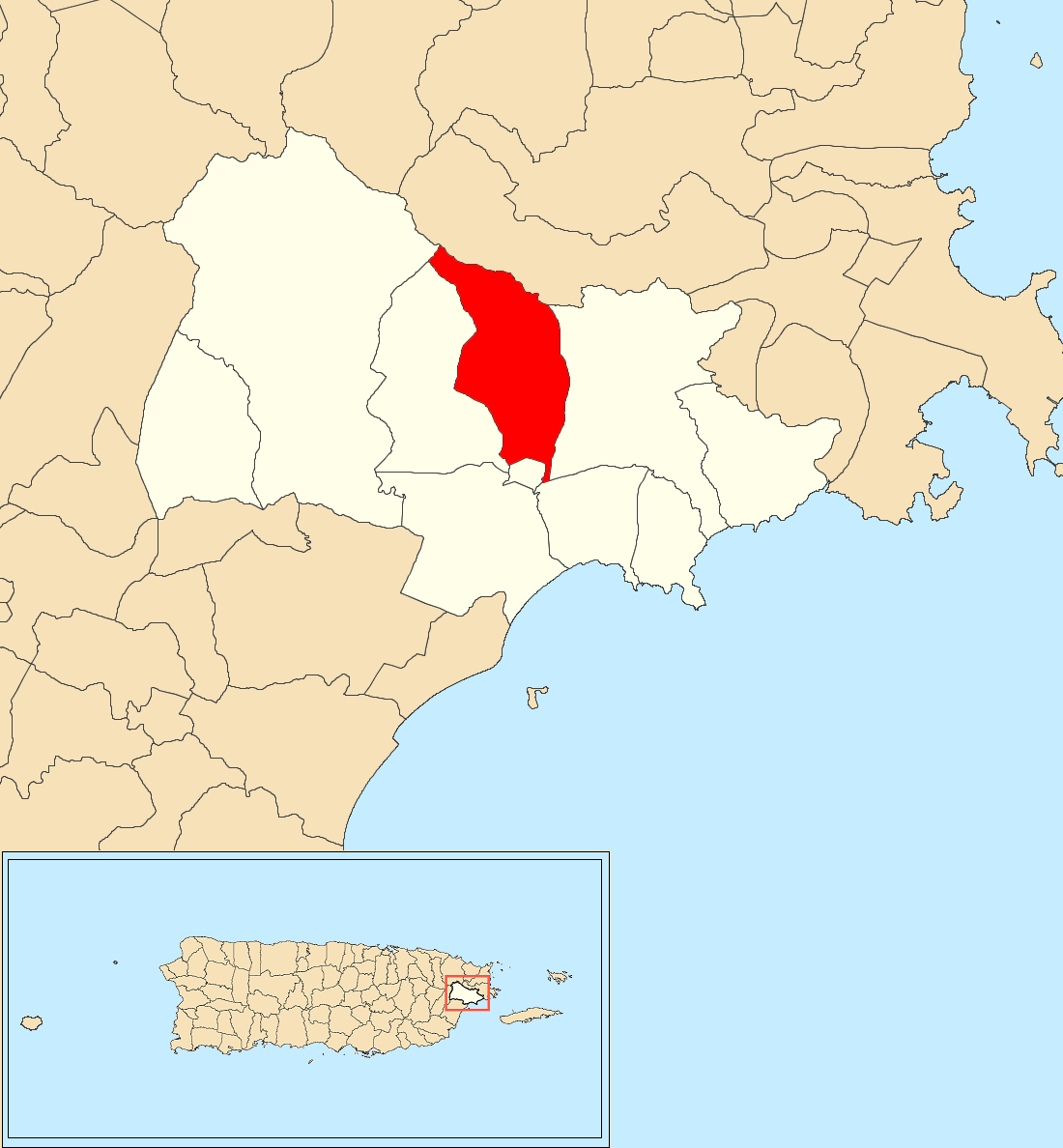
- Location of Duque within the municipality of Naguabo shown in red

- Location of Puerto Rico
- Coordinates: 18°14′23″N 65°44′22″W
- Commonwealth: Puerto Rico
- Municipality: Naguabo

Area
  - Total: 4.5 sq mi (12 km^{2})
  - Land: 4.5 sq mi (12 km^{2})
  - Water: 0 sq mi (0 km^{2})
- Elevation: 236 ft (72 m)

Population (2010)
  - Total: 2,425
  - Density: 538.9/sq mi (208.1/km^{2})
- Source: 2010 Census
- Time zone: UTC−4 (AST)

Duque is a barrio in the municipality of Naguabo, Puerto Rico. Its population in 2010 was 2,425.

== History ==
Duque was in Spain's gazetteers until Puerto Rico was ceded by Spain in the aftermath of the Spanish–American War under the terms of the Treaty of Paris of 1898 and became an unincorporated territory of the United States. In 1899, the United States Department of War conducted a census of Puerto Rico finding that the population of Duque barrio was 1,238.

Historical population
Census	Pop.	Note	%±
1900	1,238		—
1910	1,474		19.1%
1920	1,506		2.2%
1930	2,161		43.5%
1940	2,293		6.1%
1950	2,202		−4.0%
1960	1,798		−18.3%
1970	0		−100.0%
1980	2,668		—
1990	2,756		3.3%
2000	2,705		−1.9%
2010	2,425		−10.4%
U.S. Decennial Census; 1899 (shown as 1900) 1910-1930; 1930-1950 1980-2000 2010

== Sectors ==
Barrios (which are, in contemporary times, roughly comparable to minor civil divisions) in turn are further subdivided into smaller local populated place areas/units called sectores (sectors in English). The types of sectores may vary, from normally sector to urbanización to reparto to barriada to residencial, among others.

The following sectors are in Duque barrio:

Camino Municipal, Parcelas Duque, Parcelas Invasión, Reparto Santiago, Sector Dávila, Sector Hacienda Correas, Sector La Sierra, Sector Paraíso Cabrera (El Pueblito), Sector Pomales, Sector Ramos, Sector Rivieras del Río, Sector San Cristóbal, Sector Tablones, Sector Villa Awilda, Urbanización Juan Mendoza, Urbanización La Quinta, and Villa del Rosario.

== See also ==
- List of communities in Puerto Rico
- List of barrios and sectors of Naguabo, Puerto Rico
