= List of dams and reservoirs in Puerto Rico =

Following is a list of dams and reservoirs in Puerto Rico.

The below list is incomplete. The National Inventory of Dams, maintained by the U.S. Army Corps of Engineers, defines any "major dam" as being 50 feet (15 m) tall with a storage capacity of at least 5,000 acre-feet (6,200,000 m^{3}), or of any height with a storage capacity of 25,000 acre-feet (31,000,000 m^{3}).

== Dams and reservoirs in Puerto Rico ==
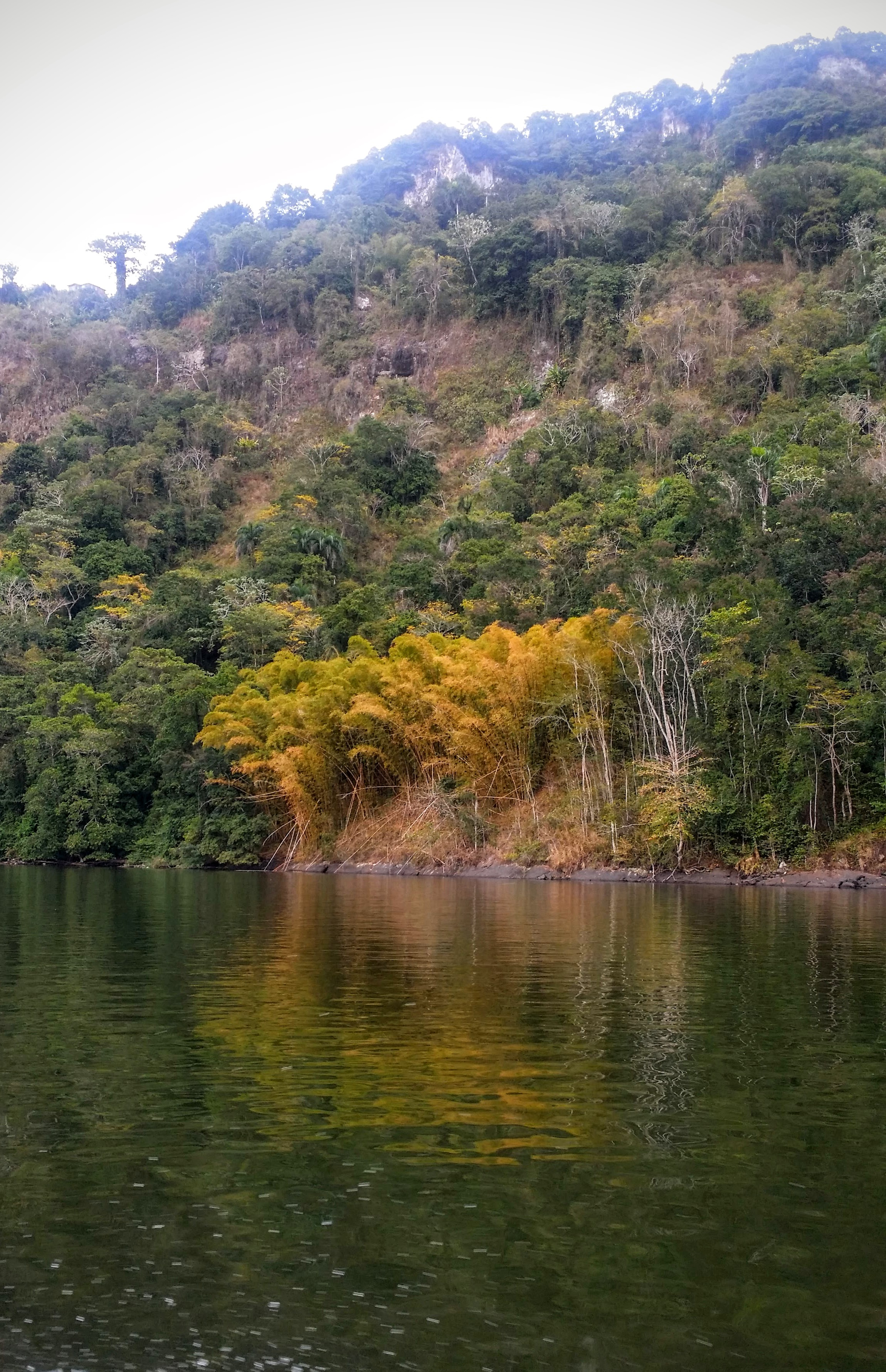
The banks of lake / reservoir at Dos Bocas in Utuado

- Lago Caonillas, Utuado, Puerto Rico Electric Power Authority (PREPA)
- Lago Carite, Guayama, PREPA
- Carraízo Dam and Lago Loíza, Trujillo Alto, Puerto Rico Aqueducts and Sewers Authority (PRASA)
- Lago Cerrillos, Ponce, United States Army Corps of Engineers (USACE)
- Lago de Cidra, Cidra, PRASA
- Coamo Dam, between Coamo and Santa Isabel, PREPA
- Lago Dos Bocas, between Arecibo and Utuado municipalities, PREPA
- Lago Guajataca, between San Sebastián, Quebradillas and Isabela municipalities, PREPA
- Lago Guayabal, Juana Díaz, PREPA
- Lago El Guineo (Río Toro Negro), Villalba, PREPA
- Lago Garzas, Peñuelas, PREPA
- Lago La Plata, Toa Alta, PRASA
- Patillas Dam, Patillas, PREPA
- Portugués Dam, Ponce, USACE
- Río Blanco Project, Naguabo, PREPA
- El Salto #1 and El Salto #2, Comerío
- Lago Toa Vaca, Villalba, PRASA
- Yauco Project, Yauco, PREPA

== Gallery ==
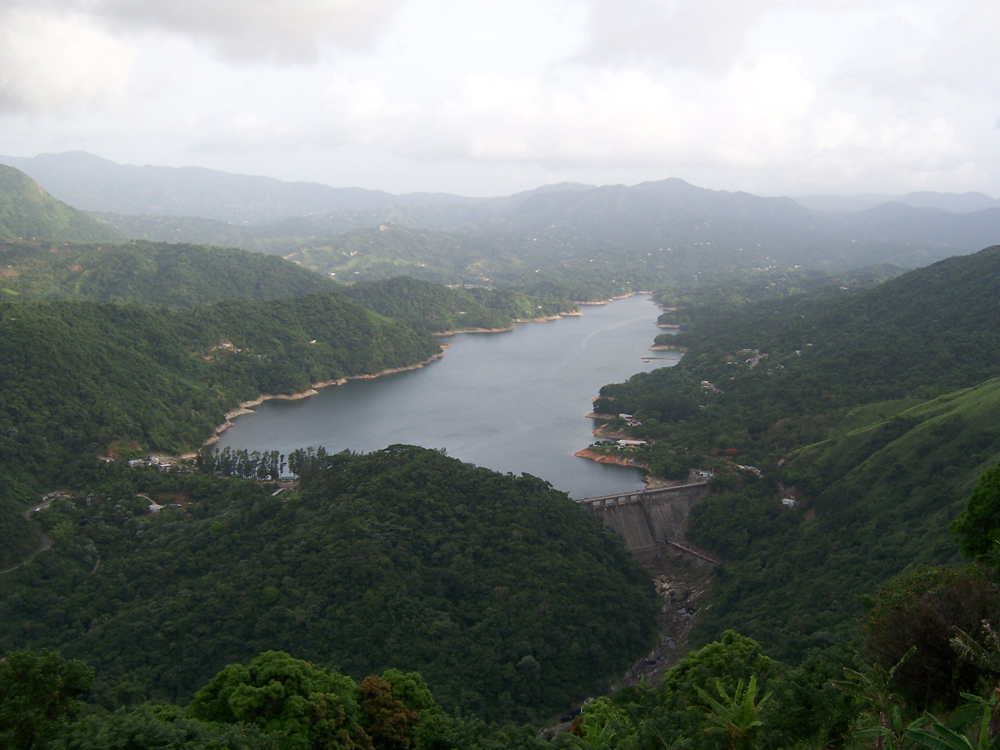
Lago Caonillas

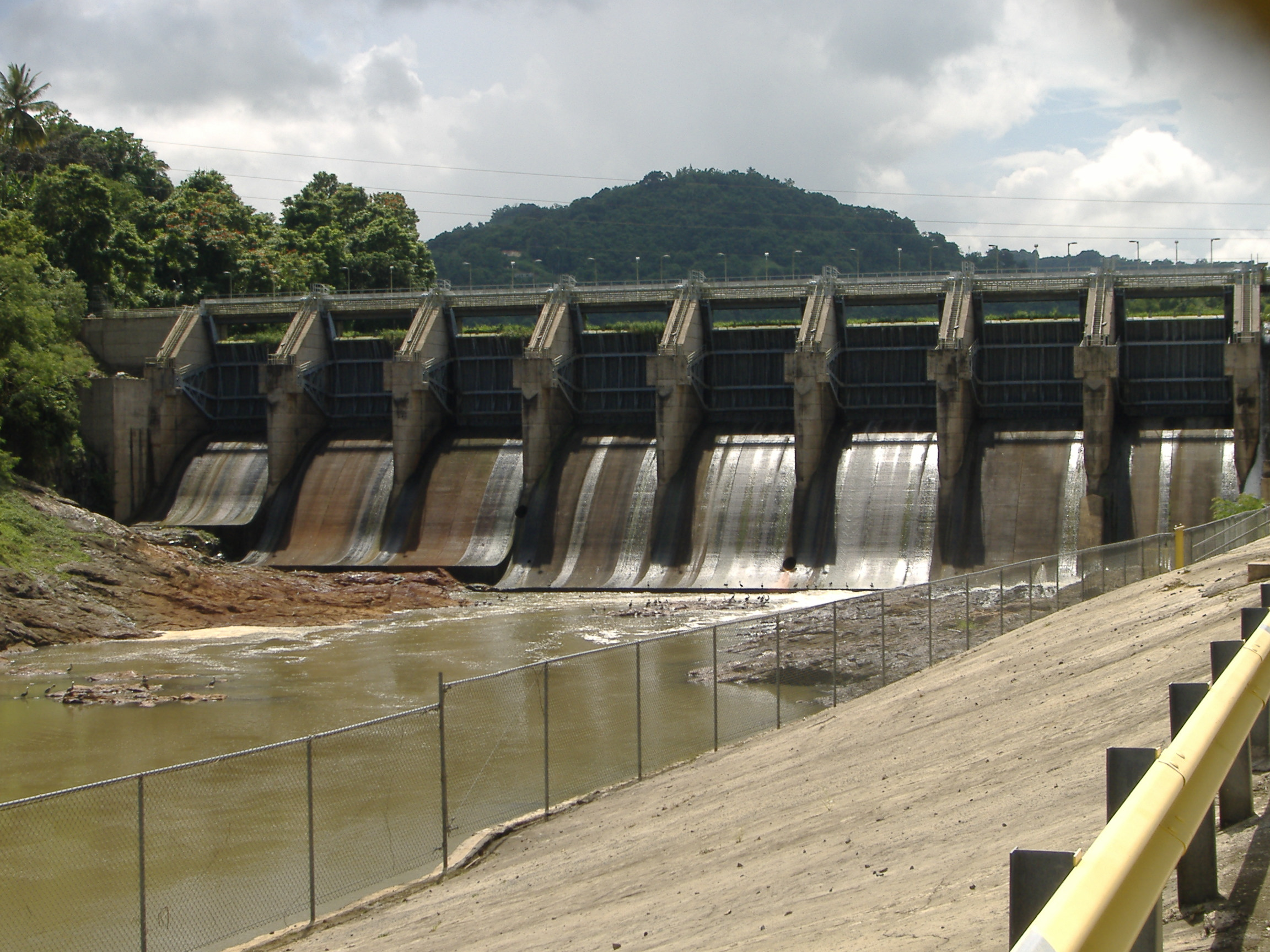
Carraízo Dam

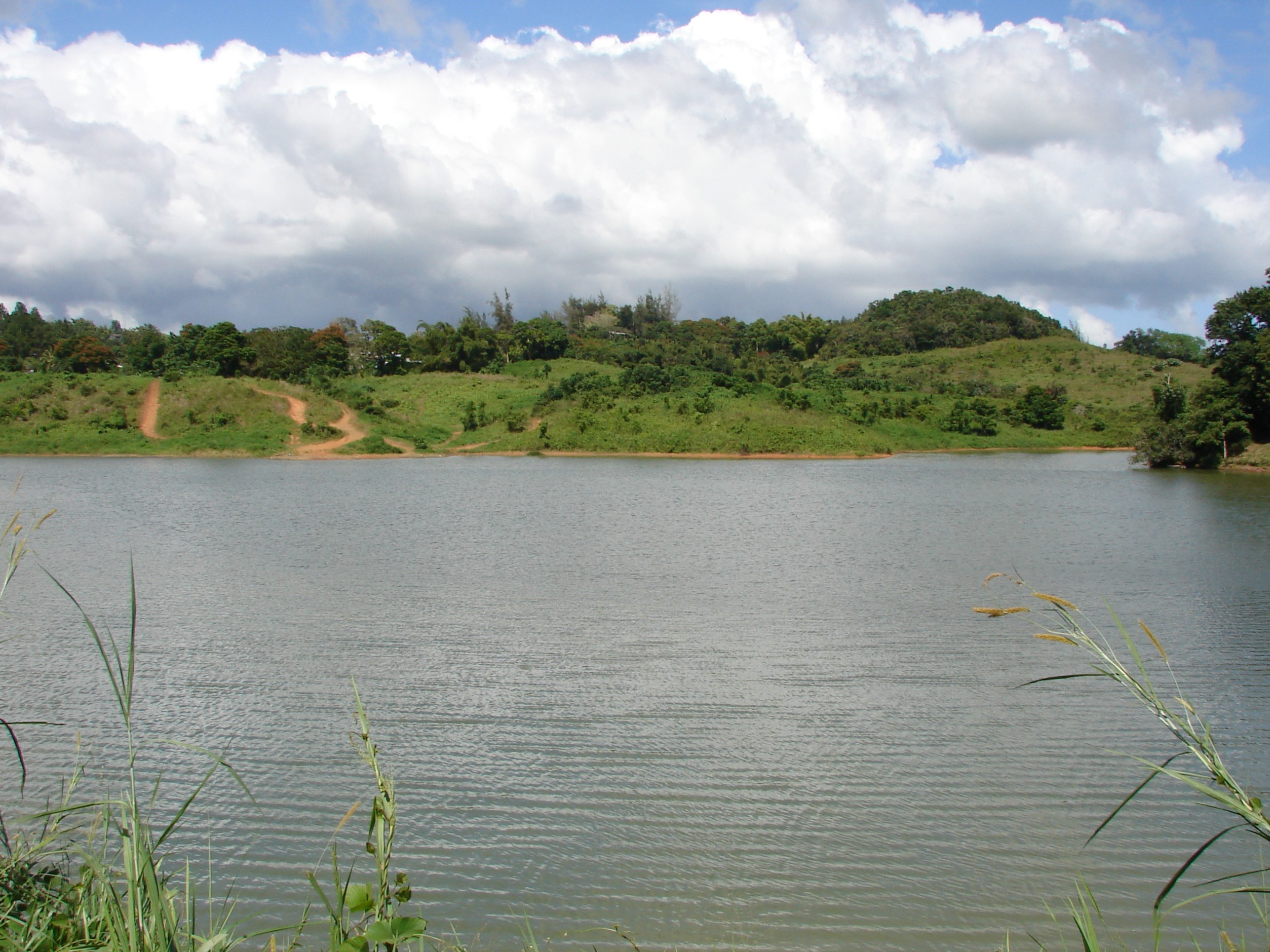
Lago de Cidra

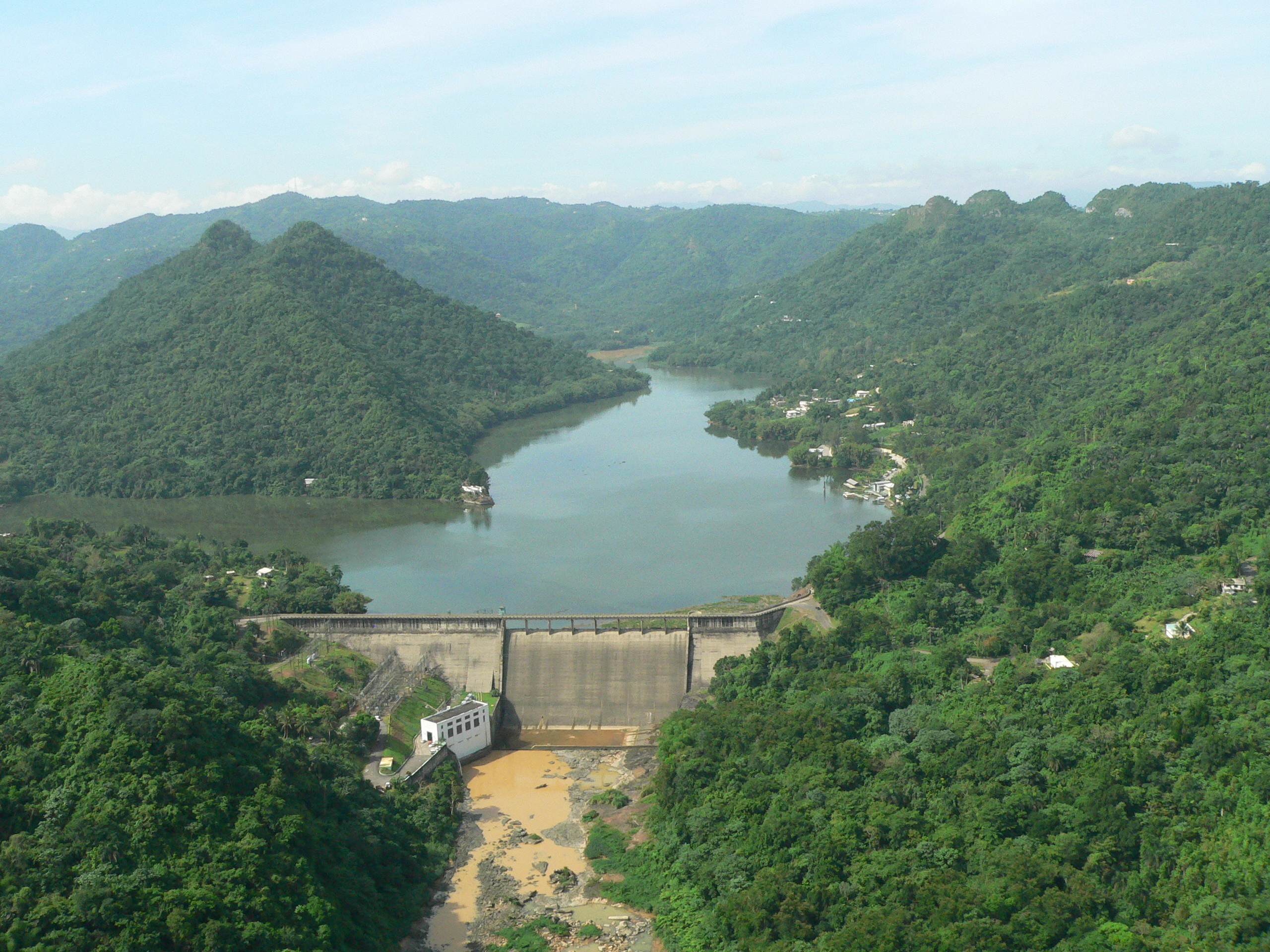
Lago Dos Bocas with dam

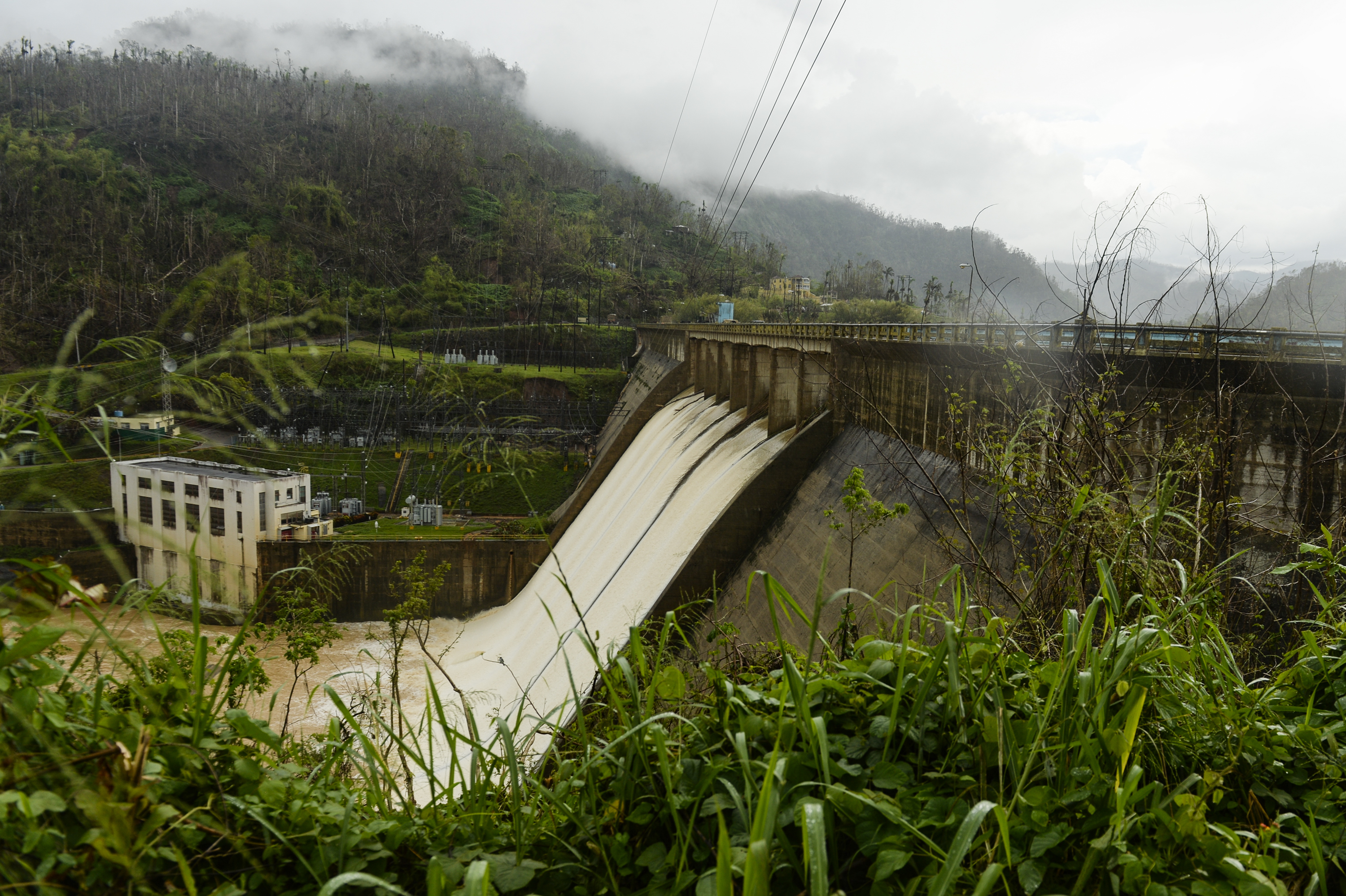
Lago Dos Bocas Dam after Hurricane Maria

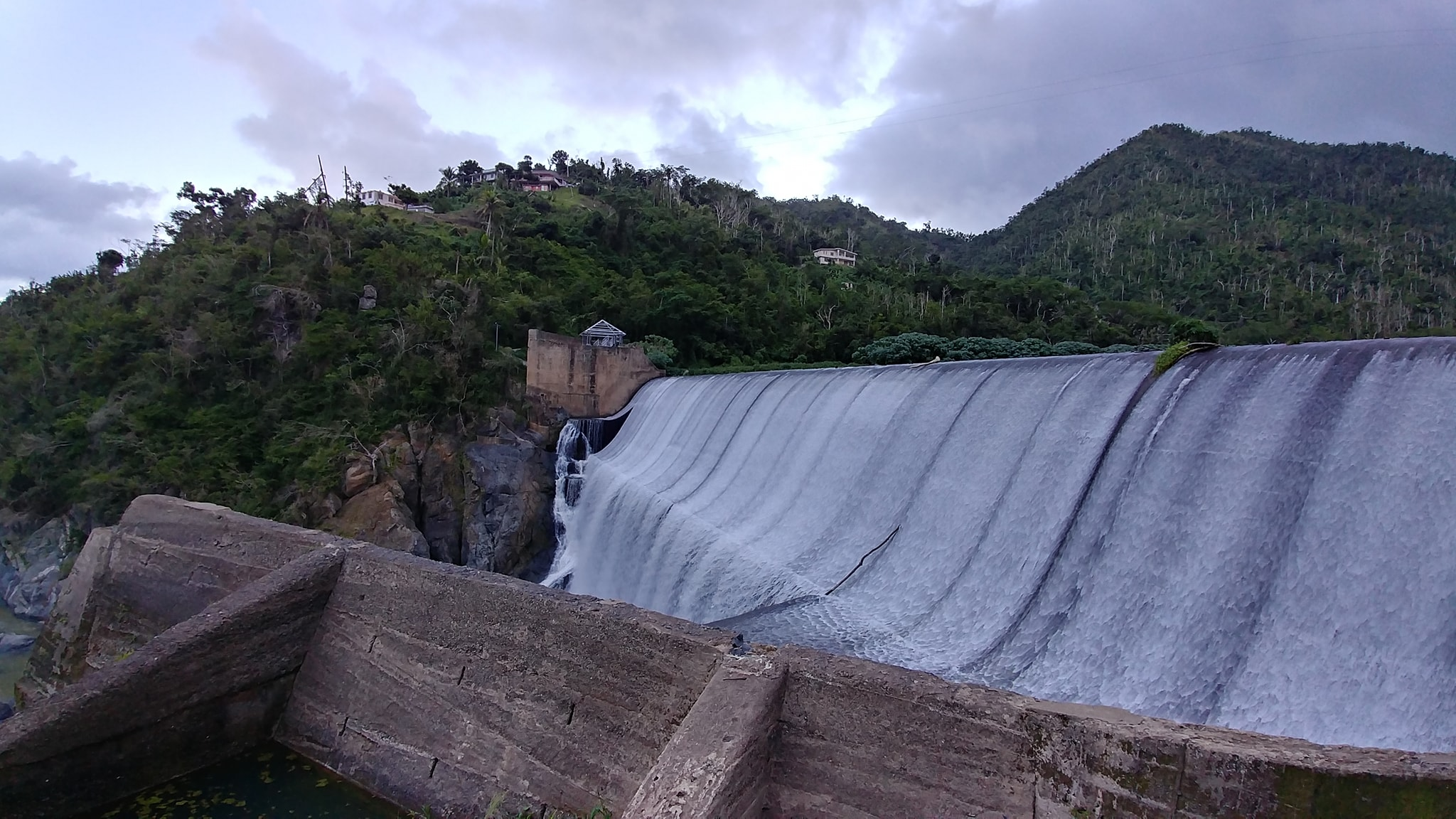
El Salto #2 Dam

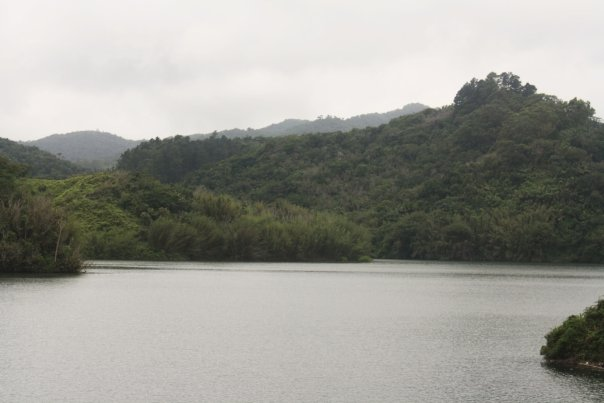
Lago Garzas

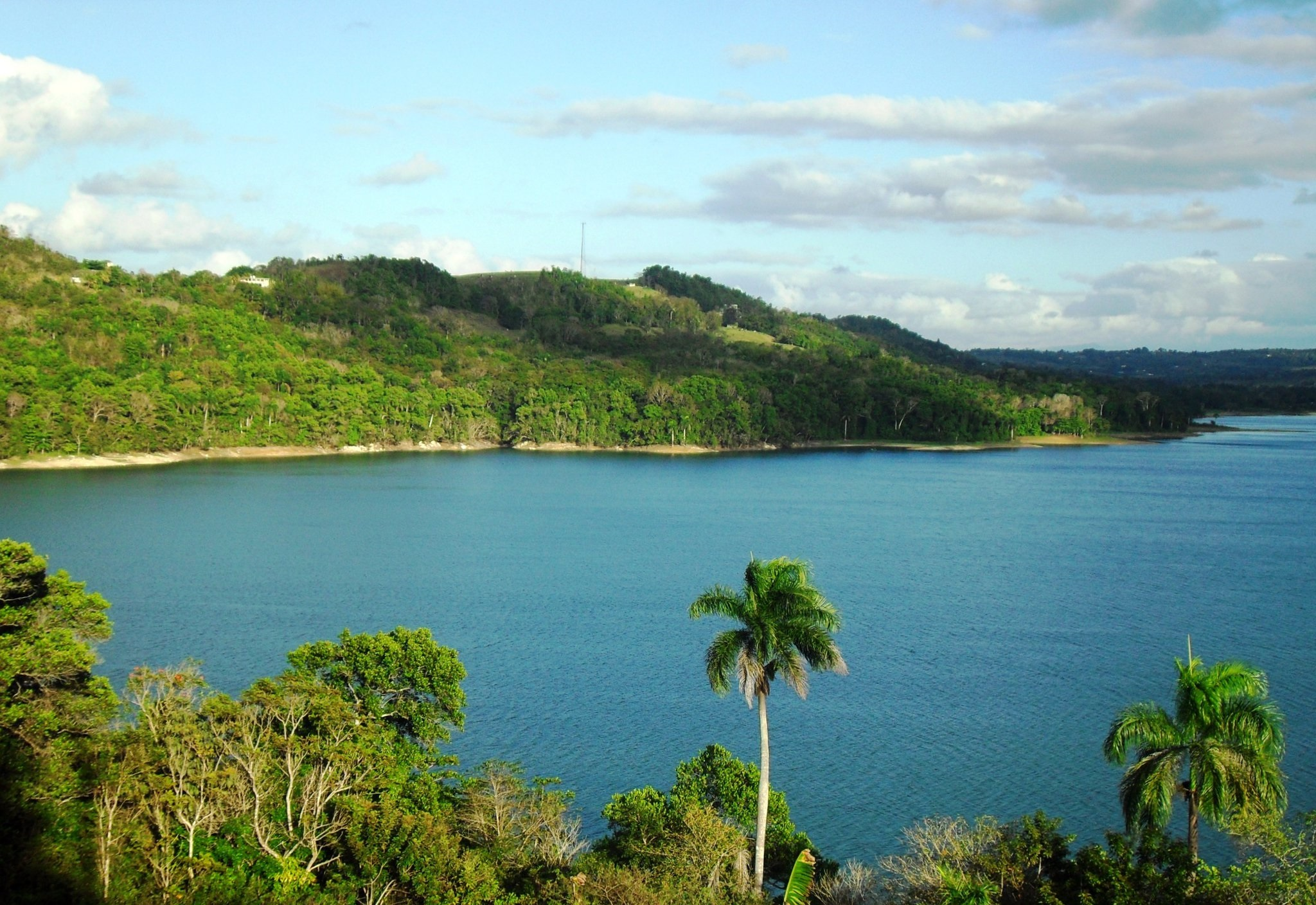
Lago Guajataca

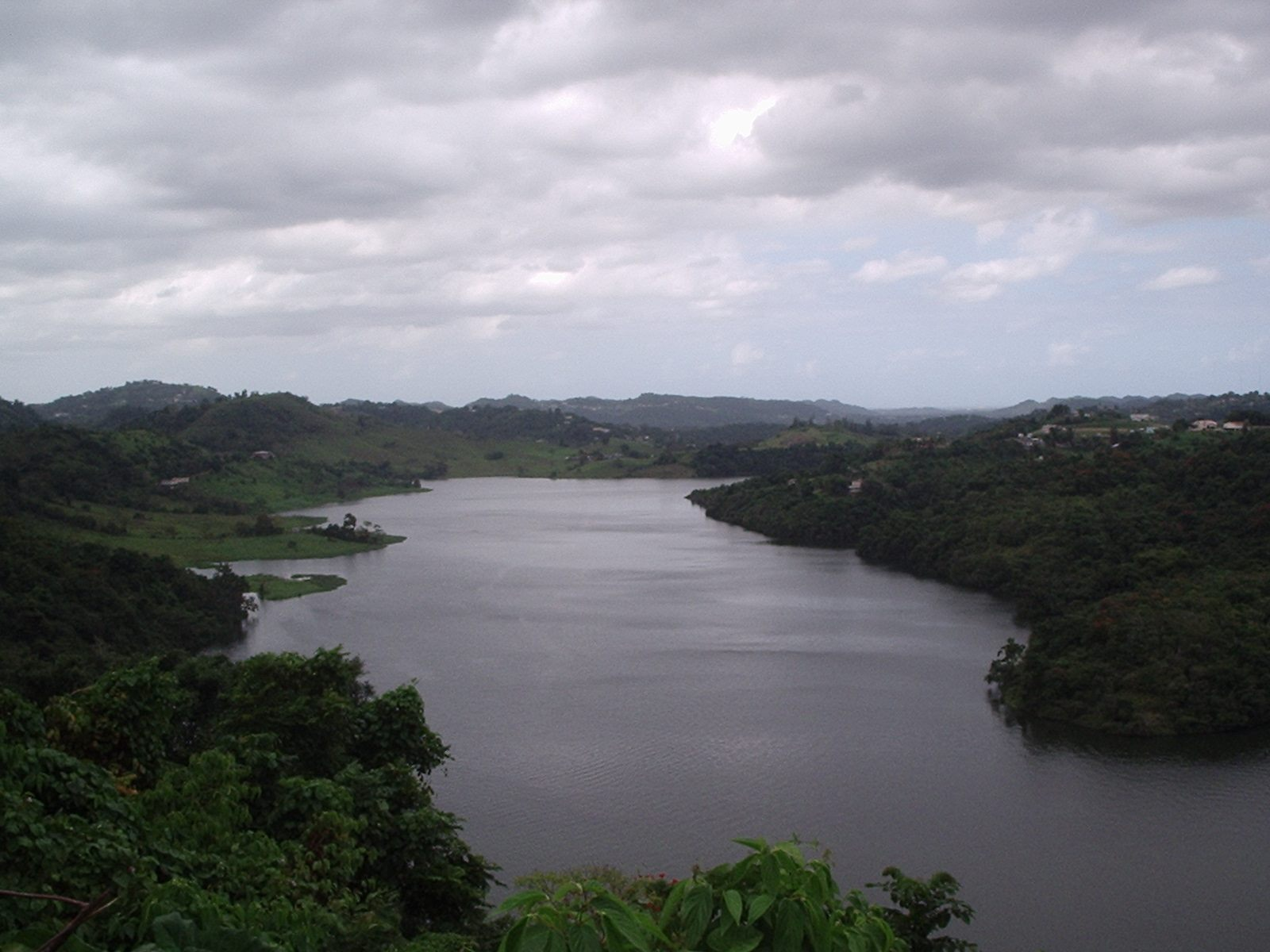
Lago La Plata

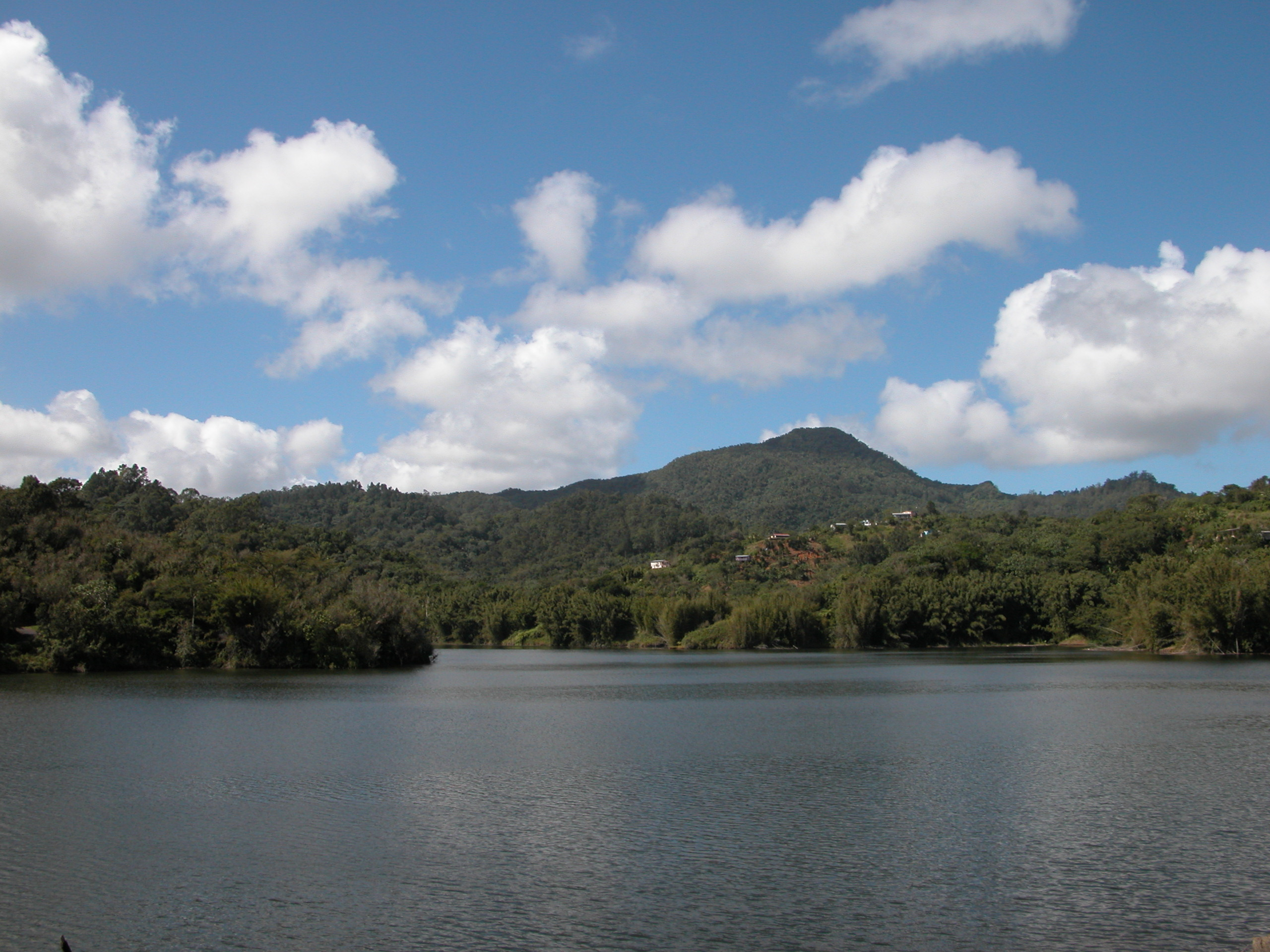
Lago Patillas

== See also ==
- List of rivers in Puerto Rico
