= Loíza Lake =

Reservoir located in the municipality of Trujillo Alto, Puerto Rico

- Carraízo Lake
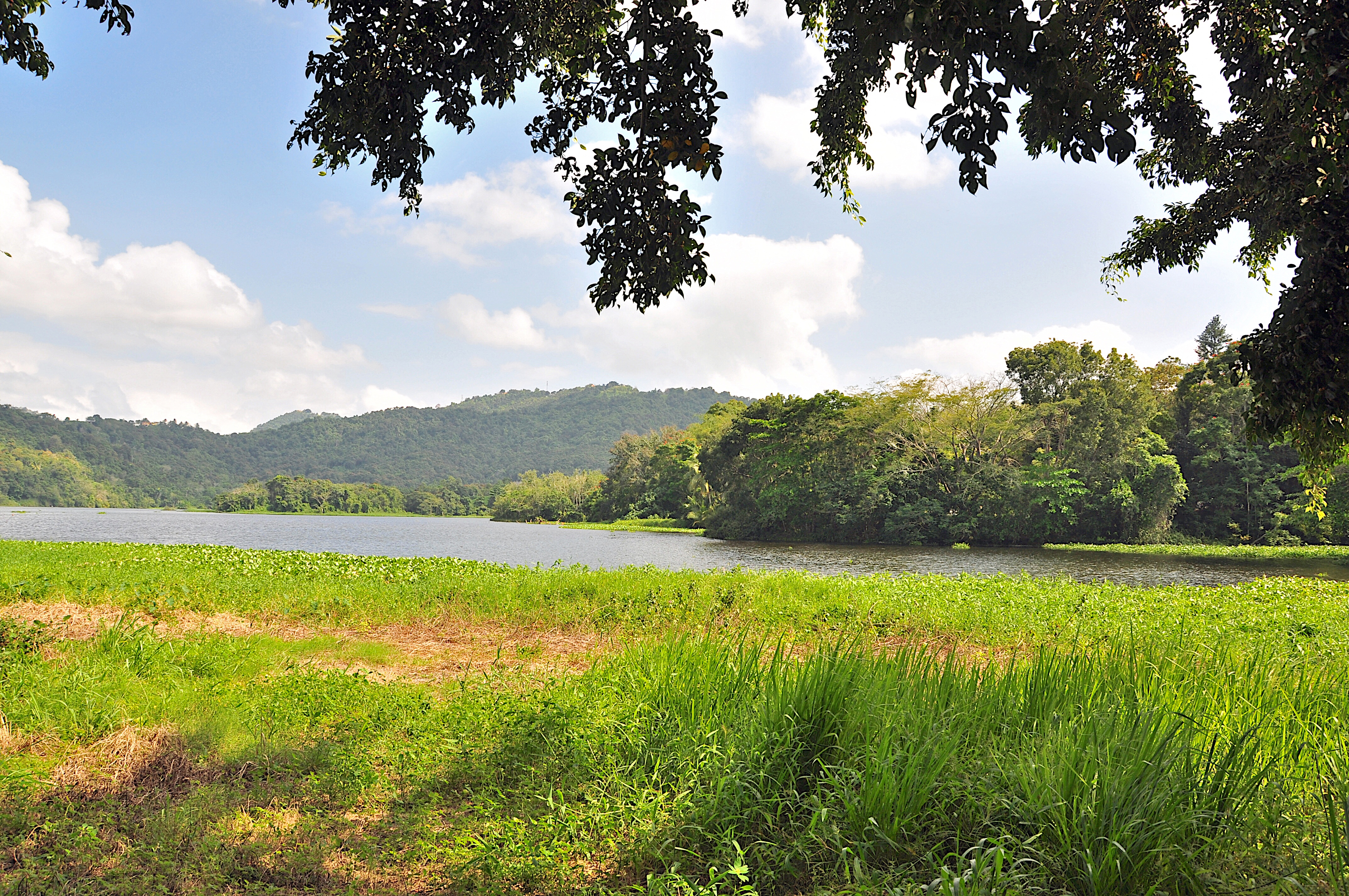

- Location within Puerto Rico
- Location: Caguas, Gurabo and Trujillo Alto, Puerto Rico
- Coordinates: 18°19′41″N 66°00′58″W
- Type: reservoir
- Primary inflows: Loíza River
- Catchment area: 214 sq mi (550 km^{2})
- Basin countries: Puerto Rico
- Managing agency: Puerto Rico Aqueduct and Sewer Authority (PRASA)
- Built: 1954
- Surface area: 1,042 acres (4.22 km^{2})
- Average depth: 27.88 ft (8.50 m)
- Max. depth: 96.78 ft (29.50 m)
- Water volume: 4.5 billion US gal (17 million m^{3})
- Surface elevation: 135.0 ft (41.14 m)

Loíza Lake (Spanish: Lago Loíza or Embalse de Loíza), also known as the Carraízo Lake (Lago Carraízo or Embalse de Carraízo), is a reservoir of the Loíza River (Río Grande de Loíza) in Puerto Rico, impounded by the Carraízo Dam to provide potable water to the San Juan metropolitan area. The reservoir is located in the municipalities of Trujillo Alto, Gurabo and Caguas, while the dam is located in the barrios Carraízo and La Gloria of Trujillo Alto. With an area of up to 214 square miles (553 square kilometers), Loíza Lake is the largest reservoir in Puerto Rico in terms of total water catchment area.

== History ==
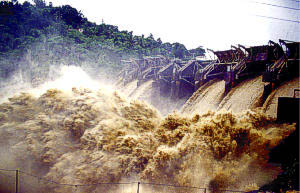
Carraízo Dam during Hurricane Hortense (1996)

Interest in constructing a reservoir along the Loíza River basin existed since the 1940s, but it was not until 1950 that construction of the dam in the municipality of Trujillo Alto began. Originally intended as a hydroelectric project, Loíza Lake was officially created between 1953 and 1954 with the construction of the Carraízo Dam in the municipality of Trujillo Alto, about 14 miles (23 kilometers) upstream from the Loíza River mouth. The lake is an important source of water to the San Juan metropolitan area, particularly the eastern municipalities that comprise the largest urban area in Puerto Rico. As such, the flow of potable water into the region has been greatly affected by droughts in 1994, when it recorded its lowest level of water since its creation, 2015 and, more recently in 2026, for example. The reservoir today is managed by the Puerto Rico Aqueduct and Sewer Authority, and it supplies more than 179,000 households throughout the municipalities of San Juan, Carolina, Trujillo Alto, Canóvanas and Gurabo.

== Geography ==
The reservoir extends through the Carraízo and La Gloria barrios in Trujillo Alto, Celada and Rincón in Gurabo, and San Antonio, Río Cañas and Bairoa in Caguas. The Loíza River is the primary inflow to the lake, with the tributaries of the Cañas, Gurabo, Bairoa and Cagüitas rivers also feeding directly into the lake basin.

== Recreation ==
The reservoir is popular for fishing, with numerous fish species such as tilapia having been introduced from the Maricao Fish Hatchery in the 1950s.

== Gallery ==
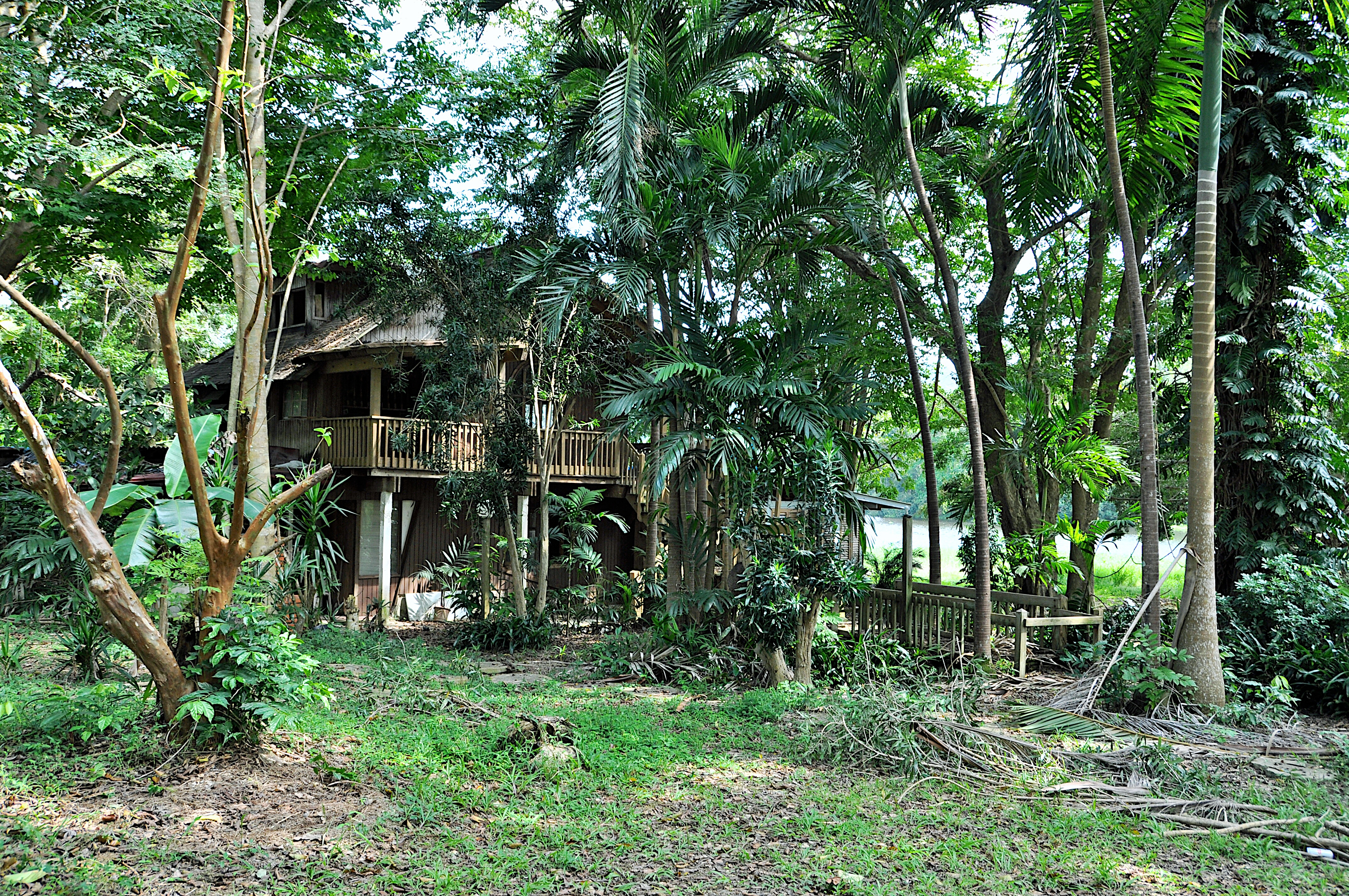
Shack near the lake

View from Carraízo, Trujillo Alto
