= Carraízo Dam =

Dam in Trujillo Alto, Puerto Rico

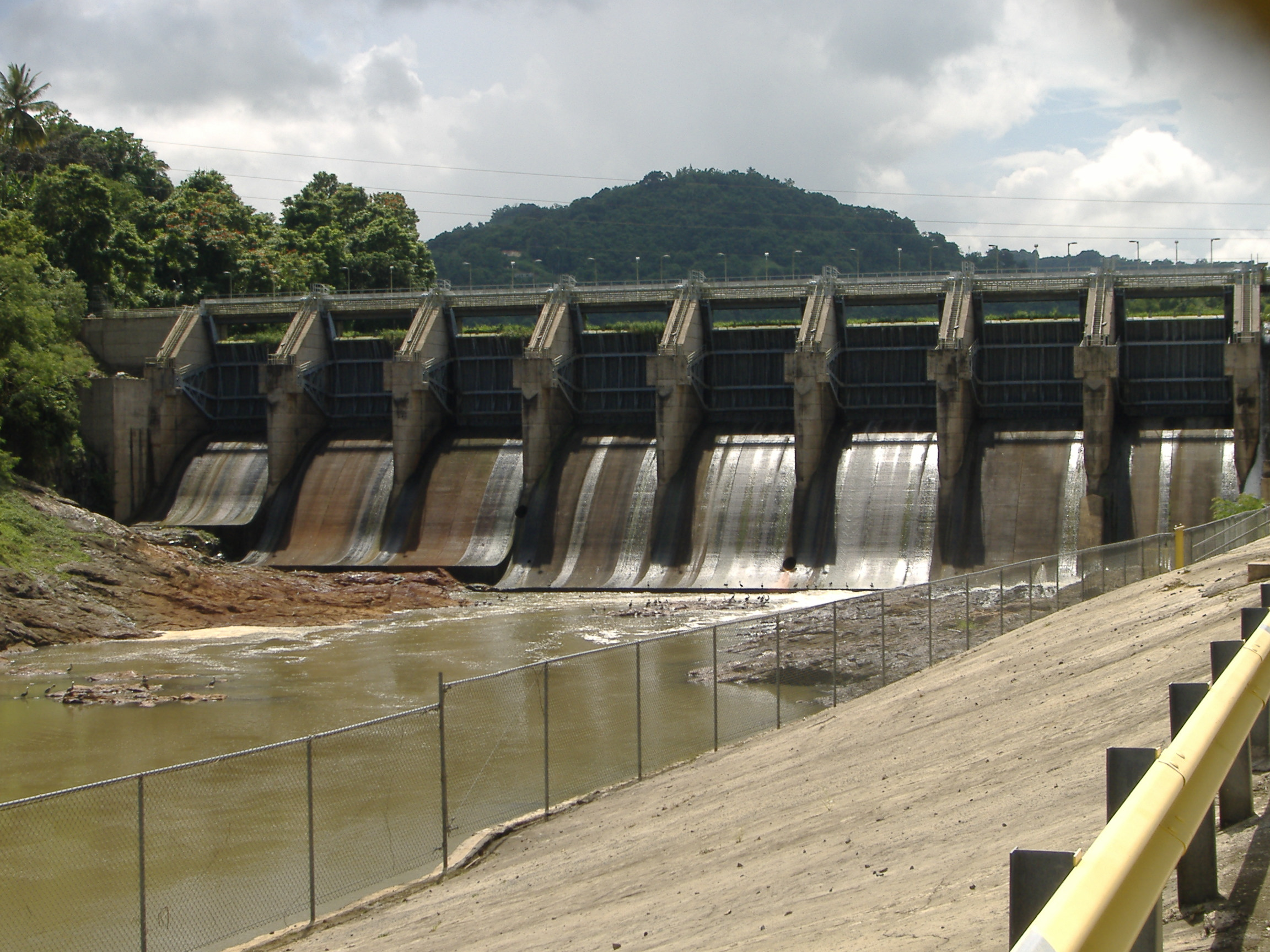
- Carraízo Dam in 2007

- Location within Puerto Rico
- Official name: Carraízo Dam
- Location: Trujillo Alto, Puerto Rico
- Coordinates: 18°19′40″N 66°00′57″W
- Purpose: Water storage, recreation
- Status: Operational
- Opening date: 1953
- Construction cost: $60 million
- Owner: Puerto Rico Aqueducts and Sewers Authority

Dam and spillways
- Type of dam: Concrete gravity
- Impounds: Río Grande de Loíza
- Height: 44 m (144 ft)
- Length: 210 m (690 ft)
- Width (crest): 45 ft (14 m)
- Width (base): 30 m (98 ft)
- Dam volume: 26,800,000 m^{3} (35,100,000 cu yd)

Reservoir
- Creates: Loíza Lake
- Website; Carraízo

Carraízo Dam is a concrete gravity dam located in the municipality of Trujillo Alto, Puerto Rico within the flow of the Río Grande de Loíza. Its construction was completed in 1953. Carraízo Dam impounds Loíza Lake which serves as Puerto Rico's main water reservoir.

== Background and construction ==
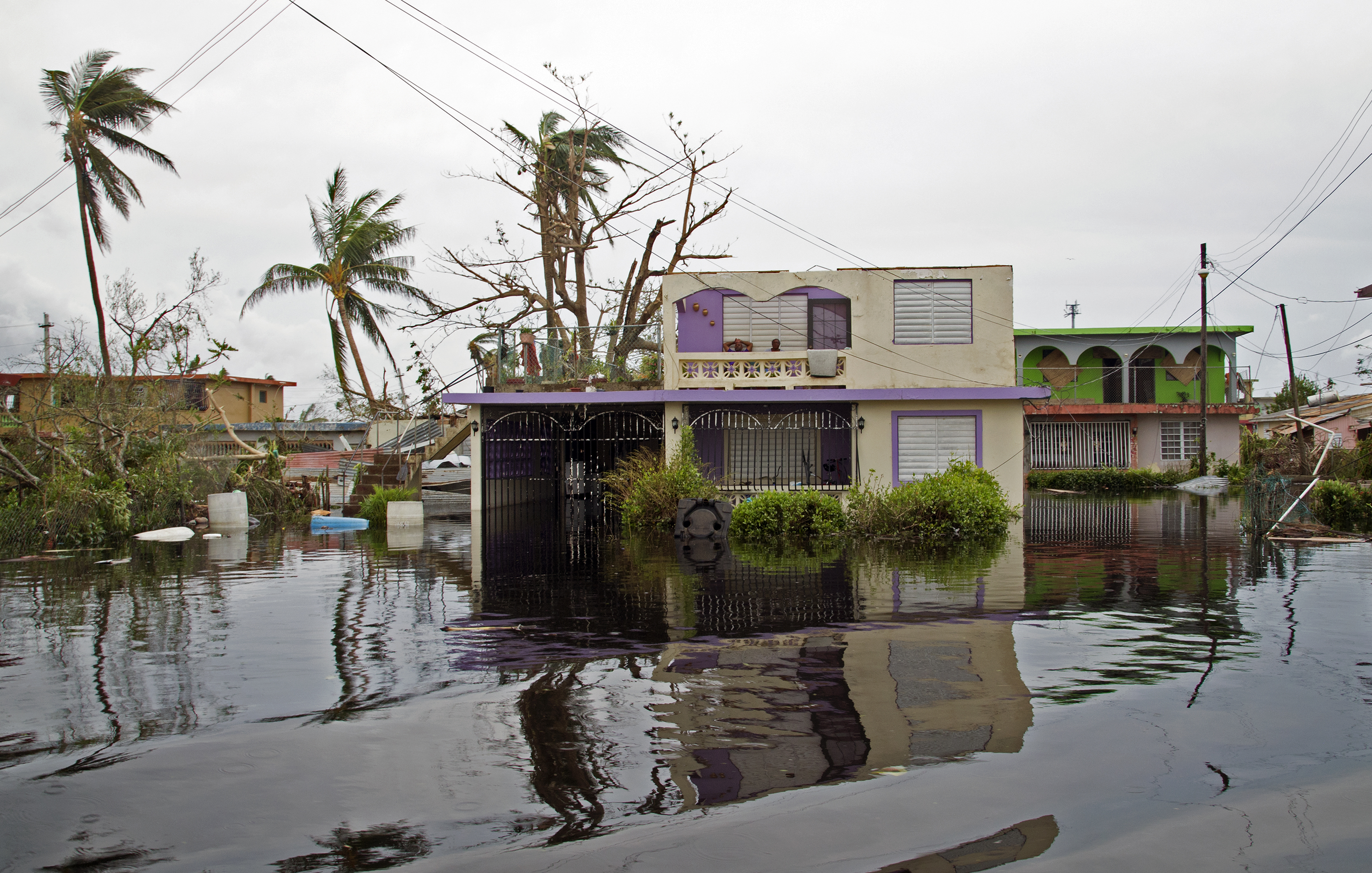
The Miñi Miñi Community was flooded when the Carraízo Dam spilled its water during Hurricane Maria in September 2017.

At the end of the 1940s, the Puerto Rico Aqueducts and Sewers Authority (PRASA) proposed the construction of a dam at the Río Grande de Loíza in the Barrio Carraízo of Trujillo Alto with the intention of providing both water and electricity to the San Juan Metropolitan Area.

Construction of the dam began in 1950 and finished in 1954. As part of the construction, the dam included three hydroelectric turbines with a total capacity of 3 Megawatts for the provision of electricity. However, during the 1960s and 1970s, the turbines were shut down because their operation and maintenance wasn't considered cost-effective versus the cost of buying energy at the time.

In 1989 Hurricane Hugo caused overtopping of the dam, thereby flooding the hydroelectric facility and rendering it inoperable. It stayed closed until 2013, when PRASA elected to renovate the facility.

In 2017 Hurricane Maria caused overtopping and flooding to nearby areas.

== Operation ==
Carraízo dam is a concrete gravity dam. It features eight floodgates along its 210-meter body. The floodgates open at a height of 1 to 10 meters, but they are usually opened at 4 meters. The reservoir created by the Carraízo Dam is the Loíza Lake. Carraízo's water storage capacity is of 4,650,000 gallons, and 41.15 meters is its peak level.

== See also ==
- List of dams and reservoirs in Puerto Rico
