= Hurricane Hortense =

Category 4 Atlantic hurricane in 1996

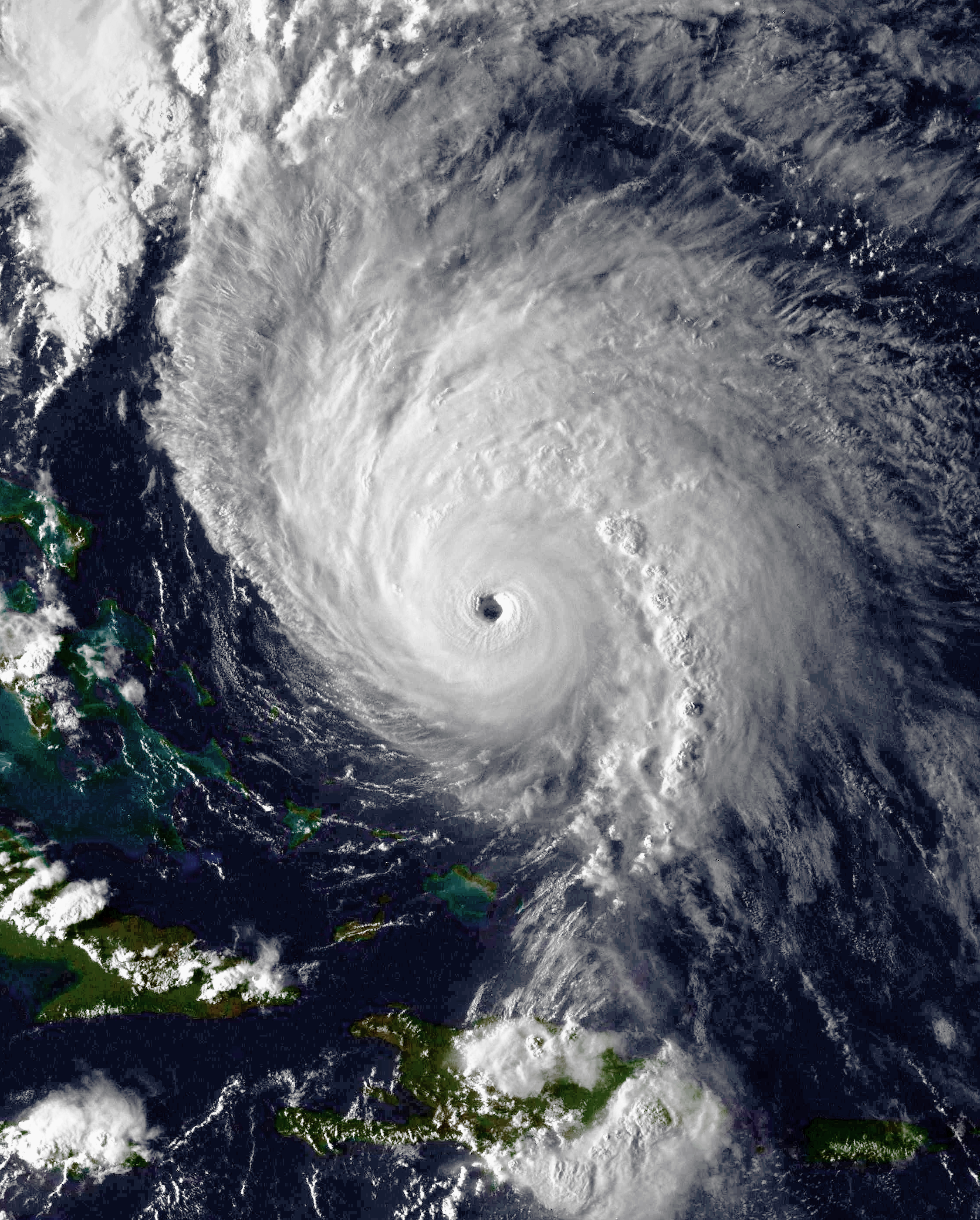
- Hortense near peak intensity northeast of the Bahamas on September 12

Meteorological history
- Formed: September 3, 1996
- Extratropical: September 15, 1996
- Dissipated: September 16, 1996

Category 4 major hurricane
- 1-minute sustained (SSHWS/NWS)
- Highest winds: 140 mph (220 km/h)
- Lowest pressure: 935 mbar (hPa); 27.61 inHg

Overall effects
- Fatalities: 39 direct
- Damage: $158 million (1996 USD)
- Areas affected: Lesser Antilles, Puerto Rico, Dominican Republic, Turks and Caicos Islands, Atlantic Canada
- IBTrACS
- Part of the 1996 Atlantic hurricane season

Hurricane Hortense was the first tropical cyclone to make landfall in Guadeloupe and Puerto Rico since Hurricane Hugo in 1989, and the second most intense hurricane during the 1996 Atlantic hurricane season. The eighth tropical cyclone, eighth named storm, and sixth hurricane of the season, Hortense developed on September 3 from a tropical wave in the central Atlantic Ocean. Initially a tropical depression, it headed westward without significant strengthening for four days due to unfavorable upper-level winds. While nearing the Lesser Antilles upper-level winds decreased, allowing the depression to become Tropical Storm Hortense on September 7. Hortense crossed Guadeloupe on September 8 and entered the Caribbean Sea. By the following day, it was upgraded to a hurricane while curving northwestward. Hortense made landfall in Puerto Rico on September 9 and brushed the Dominican Republic shortly thereafter. After re-entering the Atlantic, Hortense began to substantially strengthen and peaked as a 140 mph (220 km/h) Category 4 hurricane early on September 13. Thereafter, the storm steadily weakened as it tracked rapidly north-northeastward. Early on September 15, Hortense made landfall in Nova Scotia as a minimal Category 1 hurricane. It quickly weakened further to a tropical storm before re-entering the Atlantic to the south of Newfoundland. Late on September 15, Hortense transitioned into an extratropical cyclone and subsequently merged with a frontal system about 24 hours later.

The storm produced heavy rainfall and gusty winds as it passed through the Lesser Antilles. On Guadeloupe, damage was most significant to crops, with over 50% of banana plantains destroyed. Localized flooding was reported on Martinique. Impact was most significant in Puerto Rico. Across the island, 11,463 houses were severely damaged. About 1.4 million people on Puerto Rico were left without electricity – equivalent to about 40% of the island's population. Damage in Puerto Rico was estimated at $153.4 million (1996 USD). There were also 19 deaths, most of which due to drowning during flash floods. In the Dominican Republic, strong winds damaged a number of buildings and houses, and downed several power lines. Flooding also forced the closure of several roads and impacted 80% of crops in Samaná Province. At least three fatalities were confirmed in that country. The storm brought strong winds to the Bahamas and Turks and Caicos Islands, and lesser winds to Bermuda. Later in its duration, Hortense struck Nova Scotia, bringing heavy rainfall and hurricane-force winds to isolated locations. There were many power outages, trees blown down, roofs torn away, and roads damaged in the Province. New Brunswick, Newfoundland, and Prince Edward Island were also impacted, though not as severely as in Nova Scotia. Damage in Atlantic Canada reached approximately $3.64 million.

== Meteorological history ==
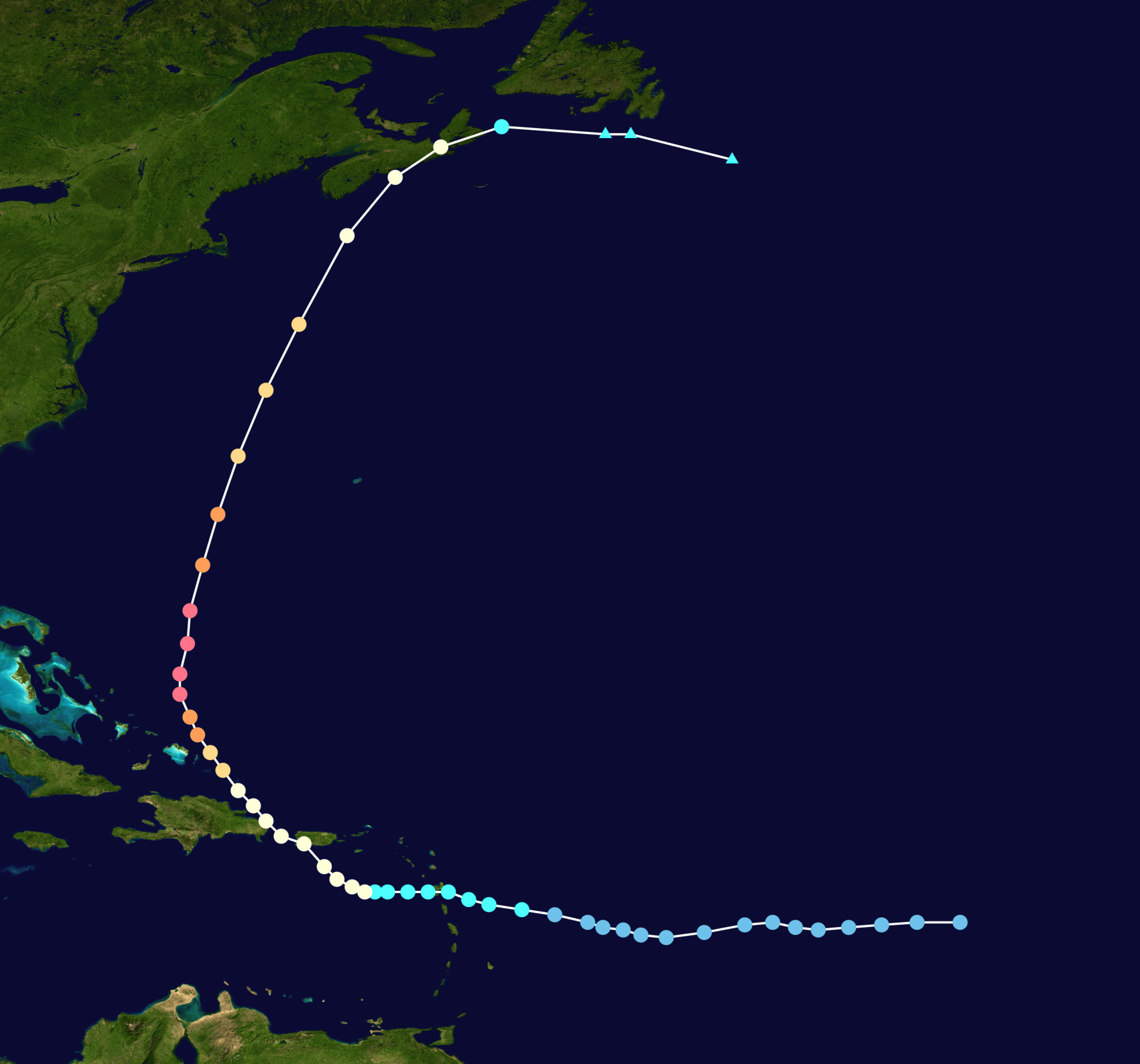
Map plotting the storm's track and intensity, according to the Saffir–Simpson scale Map key Saffir–Simpson scale Tropical depression (≤38 mph, ≤62 km/h) Tropical storm (39–73 mph, 63–118 km/h) Category 1 (74–95 mph, 119–153 km/h) Category 2 (96–110 mph, 154–177 km/h) Category 3 (111–129 mph, 178–208 km/h) Category 4 (130–156 mph, 209–251 km/h) Category 5 (≥157 mph, ≥252 km/h) Unknown Storm type Tropical cyclone Subtropical cyclone Extratropical cyclone, remnant low, tropical disturbance, or monsoon depression

A tropical wave and a broad low-pressure area associated with it exited the west coast of Africa near Dakar, Senegal on August 30. The low-pressure area, which had deepened to 1,005 mbar (29.7 inHg) by August 31, moved south of Cape Verde. Although deep convection was minimal on satellite imagery, the system possessed a well-defined low- to mid-level circulation. After crossing several National Oceanic and Atmospheric Administration buoys early on September 3, it was determined that the system developed into Tropical Depression Eight at 1200 UTC on that same day, while located about halfway between Cape Verde and the Lesser Antilles. Under the influence of strong high pressure ridge, the depression tracked almost due westward, without significant intensification. Convection remained sporadic and disorganized, with a reconnaissance flight finding a board circulation and a few squall on September 6. While nearing the Leeward Islands, upper-level winds reduced to a favorable level, causing strengthening and allowing deep convection to increase.

At 0600 UTC on September 7, the depression had intensified into Tropical Storm Hortense. A reconnaissance flight around that time reported winds of 71 mph (114 km/h), confirming the storm was strengthening. Early on September 8, Hortense struck Guadeloupe with winds of 60 mph (95 km/h). Shortly thereafter, intensification slowed, due to increased vertical wind shear by upper-level short wave in the eastern Caribbean Sea. Convection diminished, with satellite imagery showing a tropical cyclone with the low-level circulation exposed. The short-wave soon left the area, causing wind shear to decrease and convection quickly re-developed.

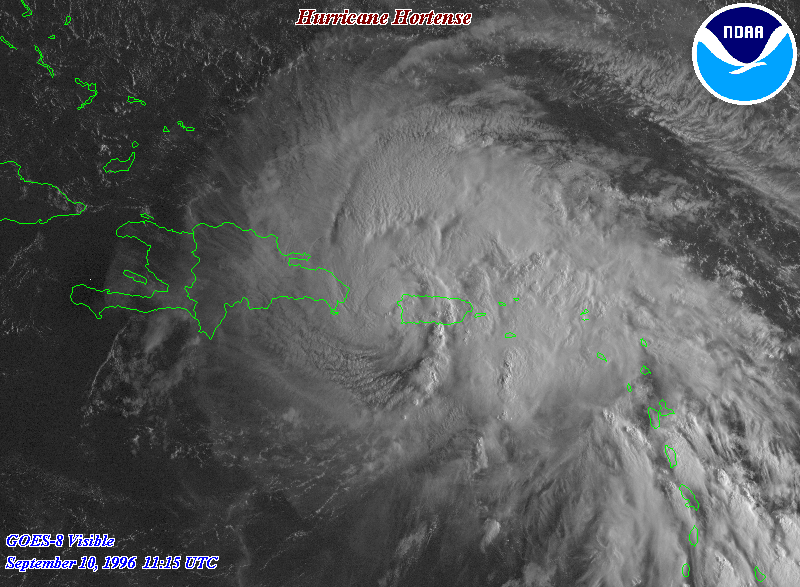
Hurricane Hortense moving through Puerto Rico on September 10

By early on September 9, Hortense intensified into a Category 1 hurricane, while curving northwestward. Around 0600 UTC on the following day, the storm made landfall near Guánica, Puerto Rico with winds of 80 mph (130 km/h); this made it the first hurricane landfall on the island since Hurricane Hugo in 1989. Initially, most tropical cyclone forecast models anticipated Hortense would pass south of the island and instead strike the Dominican Republic. After two hours, Hortense emerged into the Mona Passage and brushed the eastern tip of Dominican Republic; Punta Cana near the eastern tip of the country reported the calm of the eye on September 10. Land interaction with Hispaniola weakened the storm slightly, though it would soon re-strengthen.

While tracking east of Turks and Caicos Islands on September 11, Hortense became a Category 2 hurricane and then to a Category 3 hurricane by early on the following day. Continuing to intensify, Hortense reached Category 4 intensity on September 12. Around that time, a developing trough centered over the Eastern United States caused the storm to curve almost due northward and accelerate. At 0000 UTC on September 13, Hortense attained its peak intensity with a maximum sustained wind speed of 140 mph (220 km/h) and a minimum barometric pressure of 935 mbar (27.6 inHg).

After maintaining Category 4 intensity for 24 hours, the storm weakened back to a Category 3 hurricane. While passing well west of Bermuda, Hortense was downgraded to a Category 2 hurricane early on September 14. Later that day, the storm weakened further to a Category 1 hurricane. Early on September 15, Hortense made its final landfall near West Quoddy, Nova Scotia with winds of 75 mph (120 km/h). Hortense weakened over Nova Scotia and was a tropical storm when it re-emerged into the Atlantic less than nine hours after landfall. By 1800 UTC on September 15, Hortense transitioned into an extratropical cyclone while just south of Newfoundland. The storm's remnants merged with a frontal system on the following day.

== Preparations ==
Shortly after Hortense intensified into a tropical storm, a tropical storm warning was issued by the respective governments from Martinique to the United States Virgin Islands. Late on September 7, about 57 hours before the hurricane's Puerto Rico landfall, a tropical storm warning and hurricane watch was issued for Puerto Rico; however, the watch was discontinued at 1500 UTC on September 8 after the storm experienced increased wind shear in the region. At the same time, a hurricane warning was left after having been issued for the British and United States Virgin Islands 12 hours earlier. At 1500 UTC on September 9 – about fifteen hours before landfall – a hurricane warning was issued in Puerto Rico. The downgrade of the warning on the island led residents to underestimate the hurricane's threat. Before Hortense struck Puerto Rico, the local National Weather Service office warned of the potential of rainfall exceeding 10 in (250 mm), with higher totals in the mountains.

Late on September 9, a hurricane warning was issued for portions of eastern Dominican Republic, which was eventually extended along the country's northern coastline. A tropical storm warning and hurricane watch was issued for the north coast of Haiti to St. Nicolas. On September 10, a hurricane warning was issued for the Turks and Caicos Islands and for the Bahamas islands of Inagua and Mayaguana; a hurricane watch was also issued for the Central Bahamas.

== Impact ==
Wettest tropical cyclones and their remnants in Guadeloupe Highest-known totals
Precipitation			Storm	Location	Ref.
Rank	mm	in	Storm	Location	Ref.
1	582	22.91	Luis 1995	Dent de l'est (Soufrière)	
2	534	21.02	Fiona 2022	Saint-Claude	
3	508	20.00	Marilyn 1995	Saint-Claude	
4	466	18.35	Lenny 1999	Gendarmerie	
5	416	16.38	Philippe 2023	Vieux-Fort	
6	389	15.31	Hugo 1989		
7	318	12.52	Hortense 1996	Maison du Volcan	
8	300	11.81	Jeanne 2004		
9	223.3	8.79	Cleo 1964	Deshaies	
10	200	7.87	Erika 2009		

=== Lesser Antilles ===
While still a tropical storm, Hortense moved through the Lesser Antilles with significant amounts of precipitation. A station on Guadeloupe reported a total of 12.5 in (320 mm). La Désirade observed 81 mph (130 km/h) wind gusts and sustained winds of 53 mph (85 km/h) while Pointe-à-Pitre International Airport observed 58 mph (90 km/h) wind gusts. The storm caused significant crop damage, destroying roughly over 50 percent of the banana plantain. Further south, heavy rains led to scattered flooding in Martinique, which inundated streets, while strong winds knocked down power lines. One man who attempted to drive across a flooded road was rescued from his vehicle seconds before it was swept away.

While Hortense passed south of Saint Croix, the storm produced sustained winds of 39 mph (63 km/h) at Henry E. Rohlsen Airport, with unofficial gusts to 62 mph (100 km/h). Hortense dropped heavy rainfall that peaked at 18.0 in (460 mm) in Christiansted. The rains flooded low-lying areas of Frederiksted. On nearby Saint Thomas, the storm dropped 7.0 in (180 mm) of rainfall, with gusts reaching only 30 mph (48 km/h).

=== Greater Antilles ===
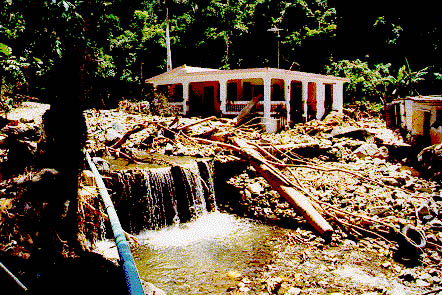
Flooding caused by Hortense near Guayama, Puerto Rico

As Hortense approached Puerto Rico, the eastern half of the circulation had a concentrated area of thunderstorms. While the hurricane crossed the southwest portion of the island, it dropped heavy rainfall of over 10 in (250 mm) in much of the territory's eastern half. Totals ranged from below 1 in (25 mm) near where the storm moved ashore to a peak of 23.5 in (600 mm) near Cayey. Three stations broke their 12–hour rainfall records and two stations broke their 24–hour rainfall records; the highest 24–hour total was 19.5 in (500 mm) in Las Piedras. The rainfall caused widespread flash flooding and increased river discharge; a station along the Río Grande de Loíza in San Lorenzo reported a 1 in 100 year flow rate. Rivers and creeks across the region reached high peaks, and there were several reports of mudslides. Sustained winds on the island peaked at 46 mph (74 km/h) in Ceiba, and gusts reached 62 mph (100 km/h) in Carolina. An unofficial wind gust of 109 mph (175 km/h) in the southwest portion of the island may have been caused by the Venturi effect, or an acceleration of winds between walls. Along the southern Puerto Rico coast, Hortense caused coastal flooding and beach erosion.

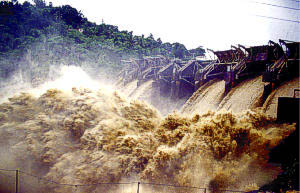
Loíza Lake during Hurricane Hortense

An overflown river near San Juan flooded several homes. Across the island, Hortense left about 1.3 million people without power and 1.1 million customers without water. During the storm, 10,563 people evacuated to storm shelters. Across the island, 11,463 houses were severely damaged by Hortense. The hurricane left $128.4 million in crop damage, primarily to coffee, plantains, and bananas. There was another $25 million from road damage. There were 19 deaths on the island, many of whom due to flash flood drownings. Some 1,400,000 people, about 40% of the population, lost power during and after the storm, straining the cleanup effort in the following days and weeks with lack of air conditioning and spoiled food.

While Hortense was near the eastern tip of the Dominican Republic, Punta Cana reported sustained winds of 92 mph (148 km/h), which was the highest land wind report associated with the hurricane. Puerto Plata along the northern coast also reported hurricane-force winds. High winds destroyed a school and church, damaged several houses, and downed several power lines. Like its effects in Puerto Rico, Hortense dropped heavy rainfall in the Dominican Republic, peaking at 19.25 in (489 mm) in San Rafael del Yuma. While passing the region, the hurricane produced a 9 ft (2.7 m) storm surge. The combination of the surge and heavy rainfall produced flooding that closed roadways. Hortense damaged 80% of the crops in Samaná. In the country, the hurricane killed three people and left 21 missing.

=== Elsewhere ===
On Grand Turk Island, wind gusts reached 90 mph (140 km/h) while Hortense passed nearby; the same station reported sustained winds of 60 mph (97 km/h).

The Bahamas, threatened by their second major hurricane in two weeks, fared well from the storm, with little damage and no casualties.

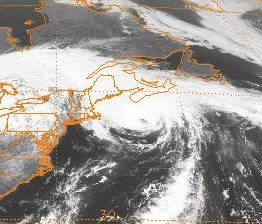
GOES 8 Satellite image on September 14, showing Hurricane Hortense approaching Nova Scotia

In Bermuda, a sustained wind speed of 34 mph (55 km/h) and a gust to 48 mph (77 km/h) were measured on September 13; slightly lesser winds were reported the following day. The storm also brought rainfall to the island, though total amounts are unknown.

In Nova Scotia, Hortense dropped heavy rainfall and caused strong winds, causing power outages, uprooted trees, and moderate structural damage amounting to $3 million (1996 USD). Rainfall was light on Prince Edward Island, with the highest observed being 1.7 inches (43 mm) in Charlottetown. Strong winds were reported throughout the province. Gusts reached 52 mph (84 km/h) in Charlottetown and 80 mph (130 km/h) elsewhere. The winds downed power lines, leaving numerous residents without electricity, especially in Charlottetown, East Point, Montague, Murray River, Souris. Effects were almost nil in New Brunswick, limited to rainfall peaking at 2.1 inches (53 mm), though most of it was a storm system that preceded Hortense's passage. Sustained winds in the province were light, reaching about 27 mph (43 km/h).

== Aftermath ==
On September 11, President Bill Clinton declared a major disaster in 68 of the 78 municipalities of Puerto Rico; this allowed federal funding for debris removal, repairing public roads and buildings and assistance to individually affected residents.

=== Retirement ===
Because of the damage caused by the hurricane, particularly in Puerto Rico, the name Hortense was retired in the spring of 1997 by the World Meteorological Organization, and will not be used again for another North Atlantic tropical cyclone. It was replaced with Hanna for the 2002 season.

== See also ==
- List of Puerto Rico hurricanes
- List of Canada hurricanes
- Hurricanes in Hispaniola
