= Carraízo =

Barrio of Trujillo Alto, Puerto Rico

- Barrio
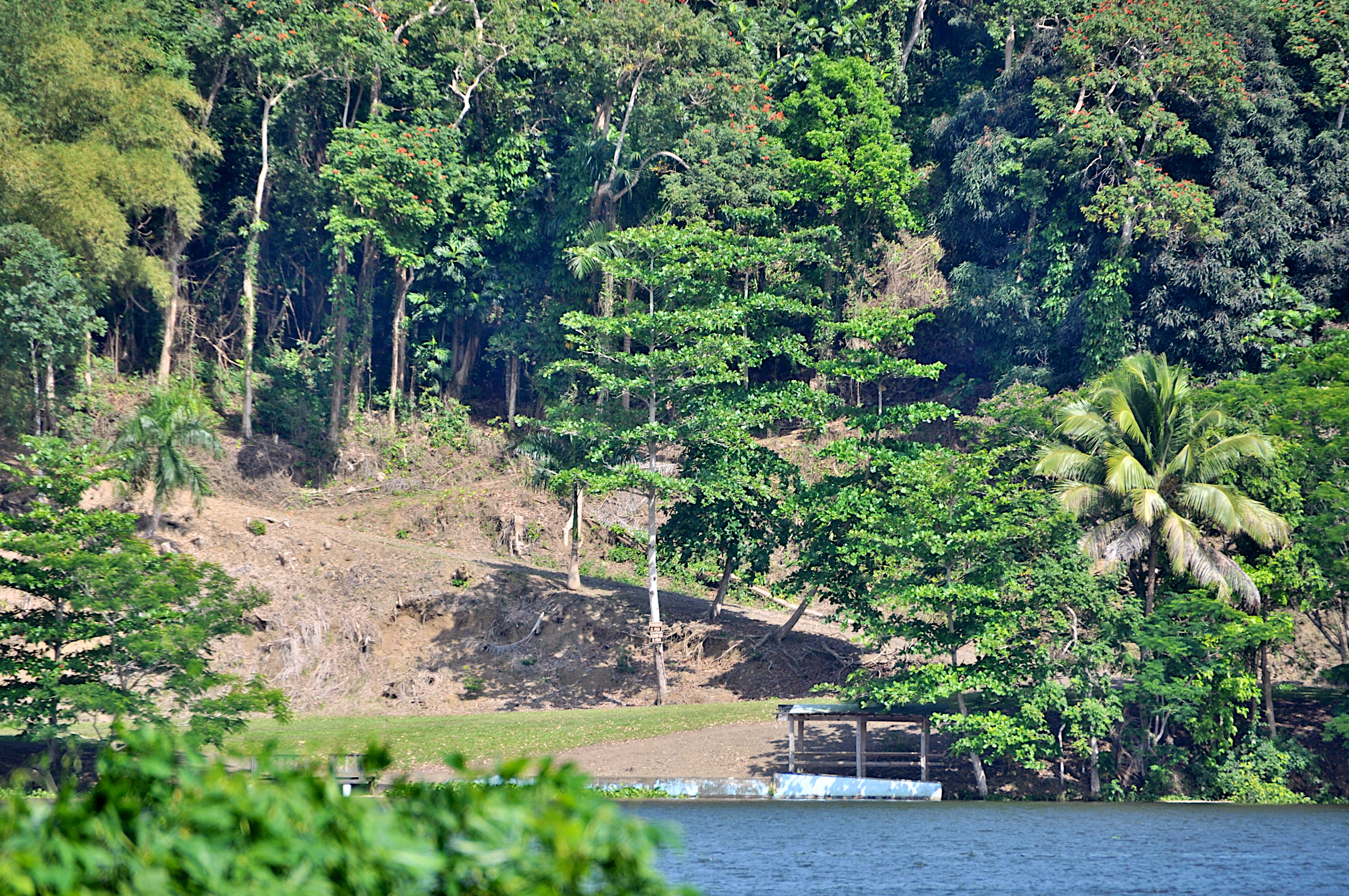
- Loíza Lake in Trujillo Alto

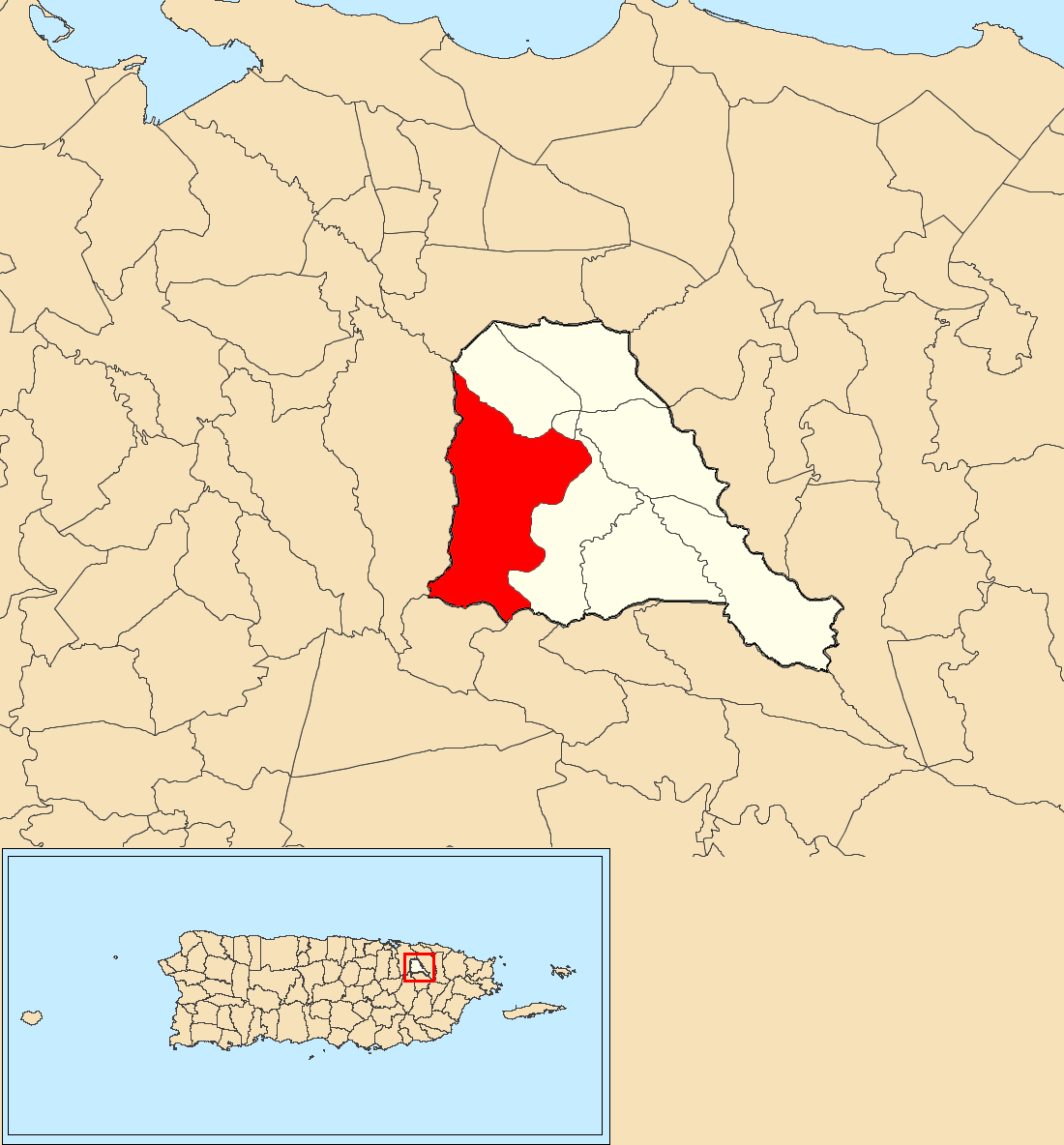
- Location of Carraízo within the municipality of Trujillo Alto shown in red

- Location of Puerto Rico
- Coordinates: 18°20′07″N 66°01′30″W
- Commonwealth: Puerto Rico
- Municipality: Trujillo Alto

Area
  - Total: 5.34 sq mi (13.8 km^{2})
  - Land: 5.00 sq mi (12.9 km^{2})
  - Water: 0.34 sq mi (0.88 km^{2})
- Elevation: 459 ft (140 m)

Population (2010)
  - Total: 16,399
  - Density: 3,279.8/sq mi (1,266.3/km^{2})
- Source: 2010 Census
- Time zone: UTC−4 (AST)

Carraízo is a barrio in the municipality of Trujillo Alto, Puerto Rico. Its population in 2010 was 16,399.

== History ==
Carraízo was in Spain's gazetteers until Puerto Rico was ceded by Spain in the aftermath of the Spanish–American War under the terms of the Treaty of Paris of 1898 and became an unincorporated territory of the United States. In 1899, the United States Department of War conducted a census of Puerto Rico finding that the population of Carraízo barrio was 1,159.

Historical population
Census	Pop.	Note	%±
1900	1,159		—
1910	1,065		−8.1%
1920	1,340		25.8%
1930	1,444		7.8%
1940	1,784		23.5%
1950	2,252		26.2%
1960	3,427		52.2%
1970	0		−100.0%
1980	11,081		—
1990	14,710		32.7%
2000	16,380		11.4%
2010	16,399		0.1%
U.S. Decennial Census; 1899 (shown as 1900) 1910-1930; 1930-1950 1980-2000 2010

== Carraízo Dam and Loíza Lake ==
The Loíza Lake is a reservoir located in Carraizo, formed by the construction of the Carraízo Dam on the Río Grande de Loíza. It serves as the main water supply source of the San Juan metropolitan area.

== Gallery ==
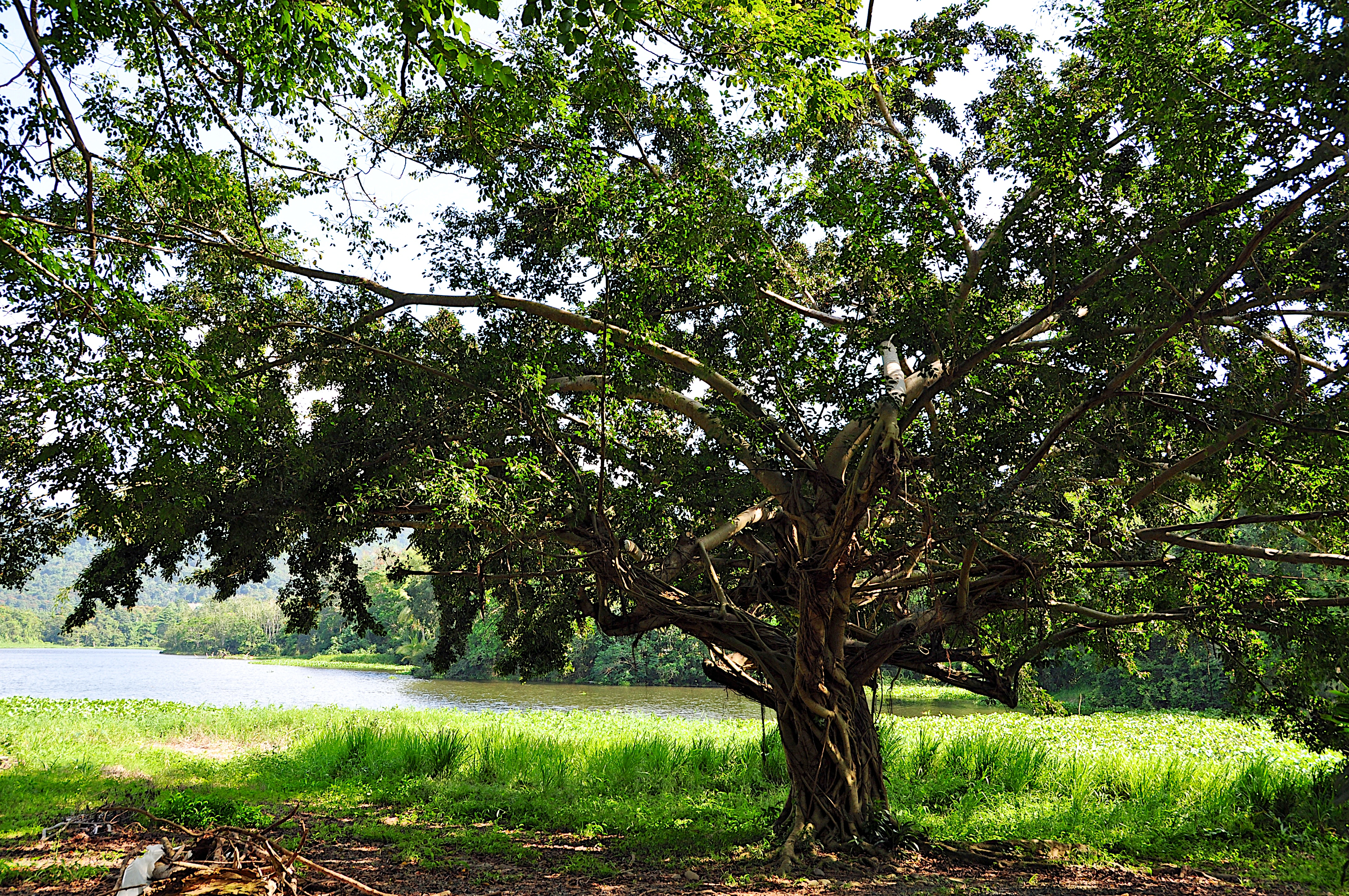

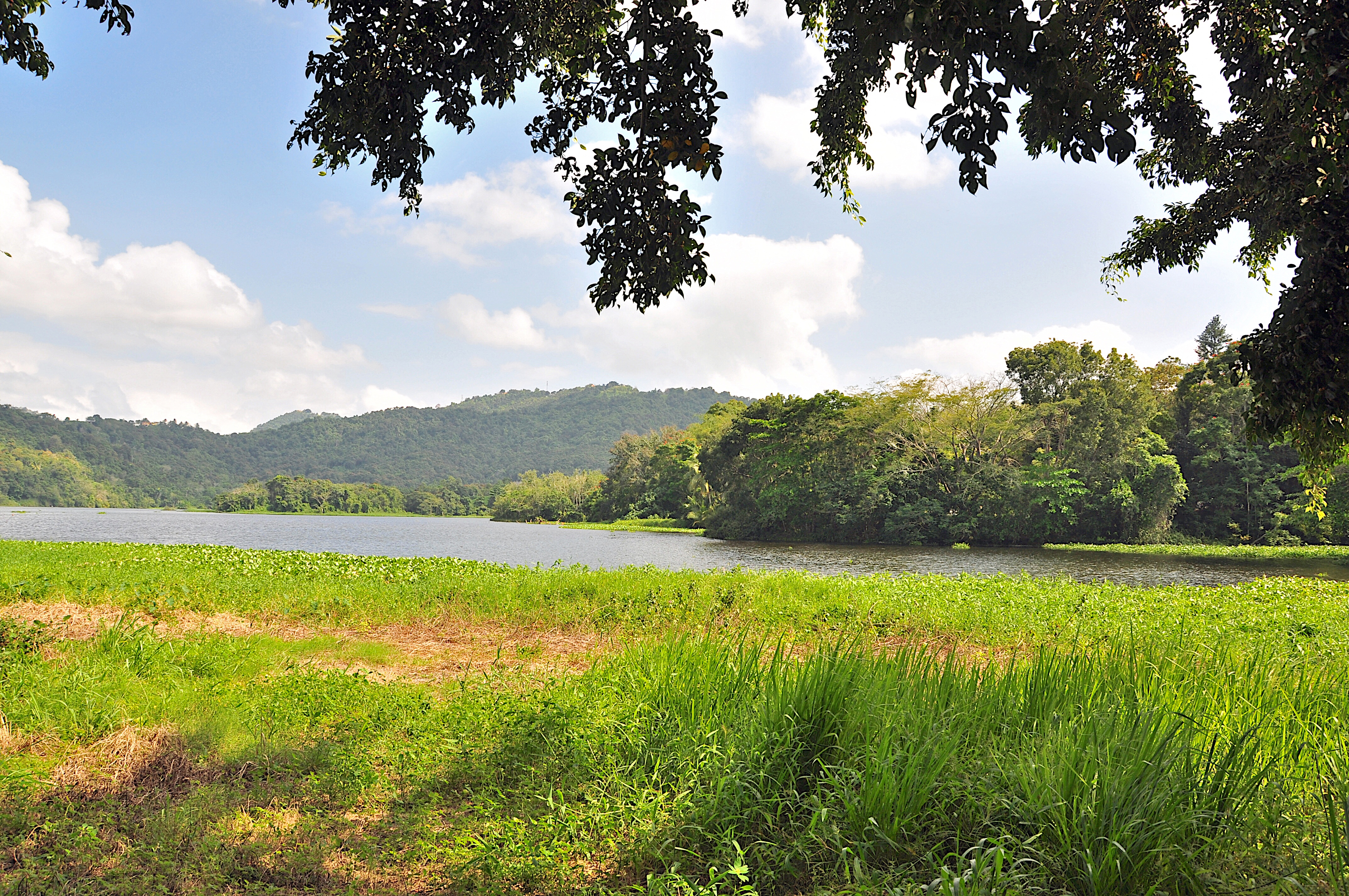
View of Loíza Lake

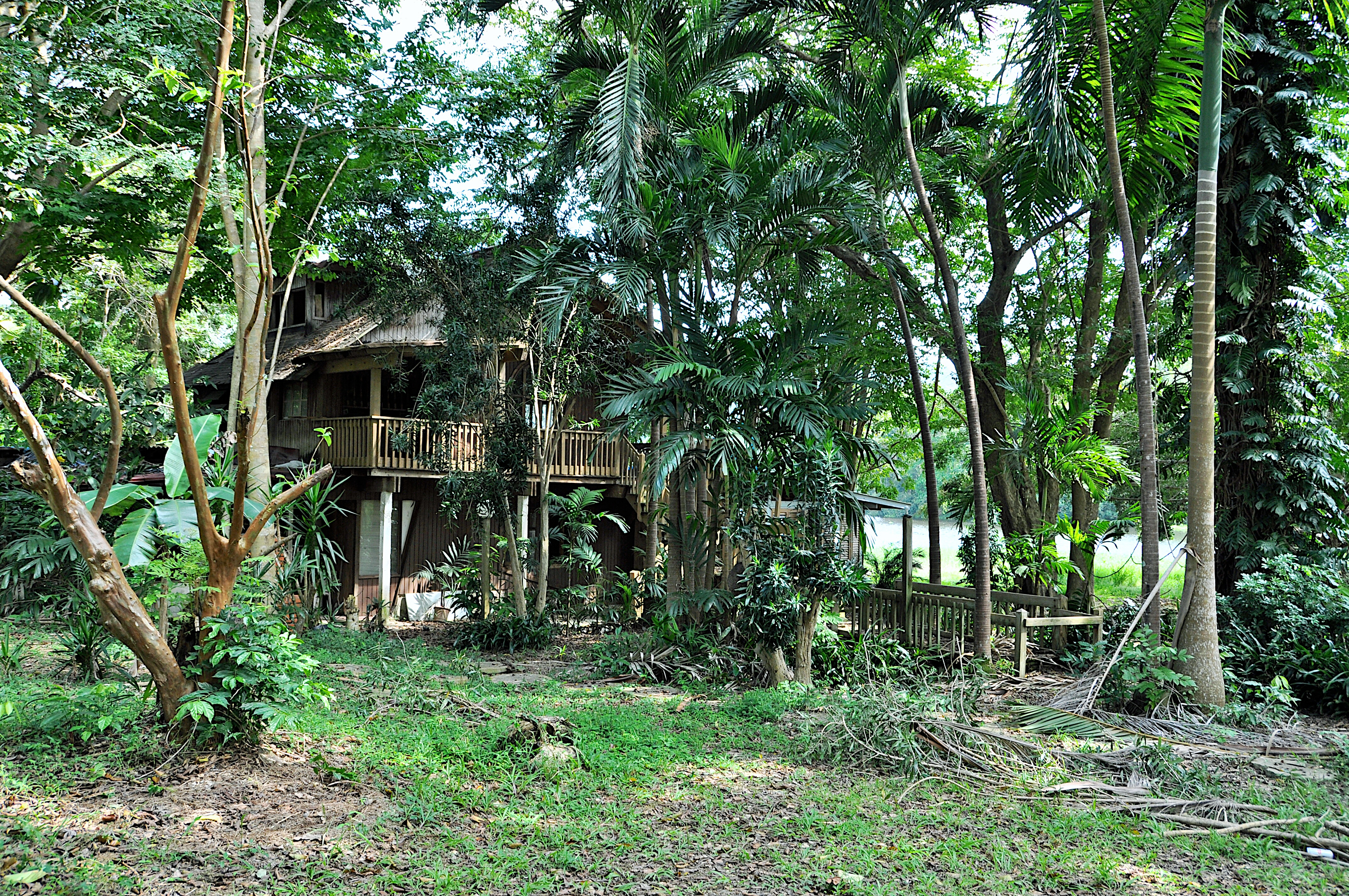
Shack near Loíza Lake

== Popular culture ==
"Carraízo" is popularly used in Puerto Rican vernacular Spanish as a minced oath to substitute for "carajo" (a vulgar term equivalent to "hell" in Caribbean Spanish). The expression "anda pa'l Carraízo" and its variants is equivalent to "go to heck" or "buzz off" in English. It is considered mild enough to use in polite company. The expression has spread to the Dominican Republic, probably due to the close ties between the two islands.

== See also ==
- List of communities in Puerto Rico
