= 2015 Caribbean drought =

Drought event that took place in the Caribbean

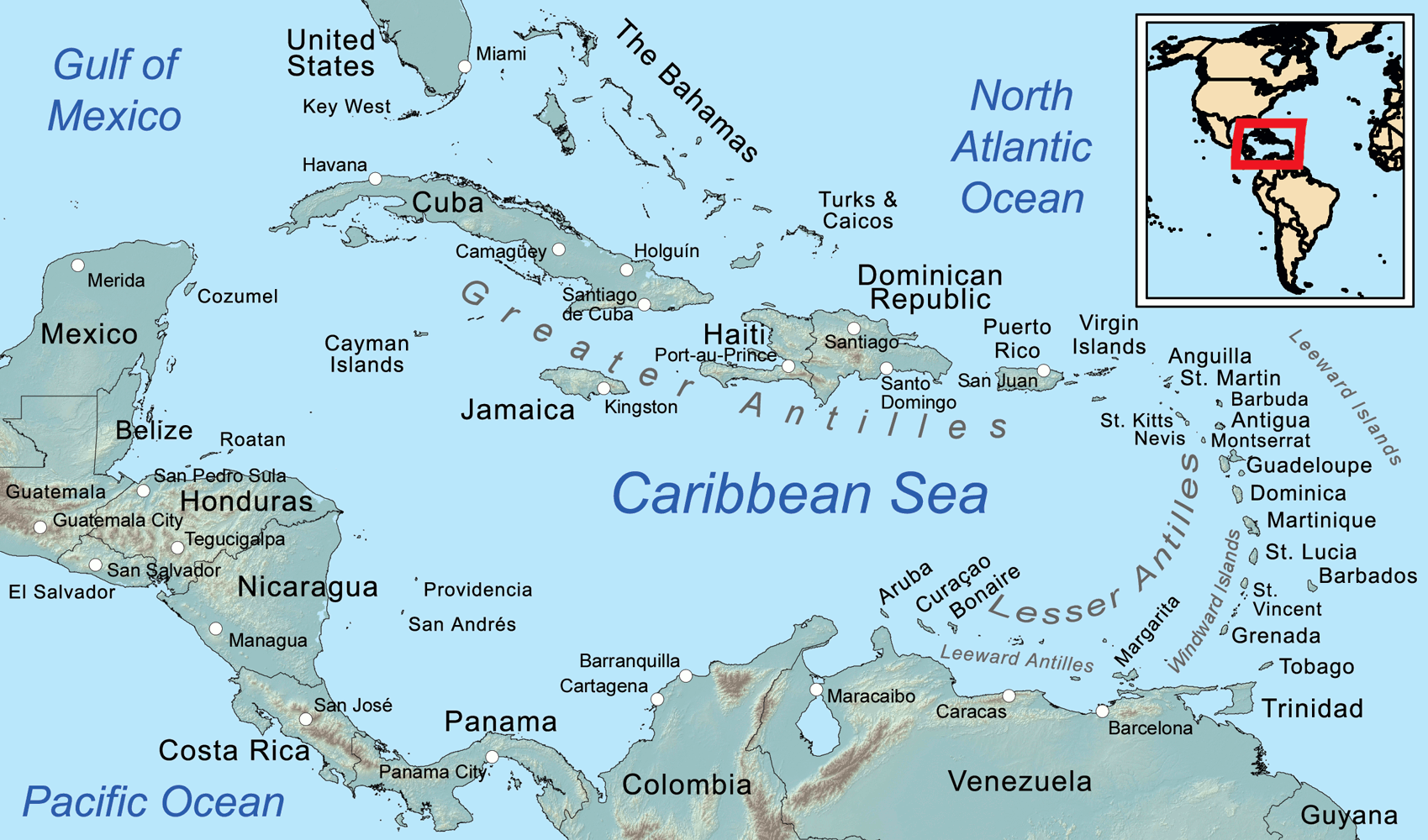
Caribbean Islands

The 2015 Caribbean drought was a significant drought affecting the Caribbean islands, from Cuba to Trinidad and Tobago. The situation is further aggravated by the presence of an abnormal amount of dust and dry air over the southern Atlantic. Besides the especially hard hit U.S. Commonwealth of Puerto Rico, other Caribbean islands were affected by drought conditions to varying degrees. These include Cuba, the Dominican Republic, Jamaica, St. Lucia, and Trinidad and Tobago. The drought region also extends to Guyana in the northeastern region of South America.

== Puerto Rico ==
The water crisis has affected primarily the eastern part of the island. According to the United States Drought Monitor, about 20 percent of the island has been experiencing “extreme” to “exceptionally extreme” drought. The situation has been aggravated by a lack of maintenance of the infrastructure, whereby more than half of the water supply is lost through distribution. (Note: Rivera Arguinzoni (2015, in Spanish) "Recurrir a racionamientos en un país donde se potabiliza tanta agua es resultado de la gestión insuficiente de la Autoridad de Acueductos y Alcantarillados (AAA) corporación pública que ha invertido millones de dólares para aumentar su producción, pero hoy día pierde más de la mitad.") (Note: Gómez (2013, in Spanish) "La pérdida de agua que experimenta la Autoridad de Acueductos y Alcantarillados (AAA), y que se estima en un 62%, la pagan en sus facturas los consumidores y la seguirán pagando por muchos años, reconoció hoy, martes, el presidente ejecutivo de esa corporación, Alberto Lázaro.") July, usually one of the wettest months, saw only 4 cm of rain. The Puerto Rico Aqueducts and Sewers Authority (PRASA), responsible for managing water on the island, initiated rationing in May 2015. NBC simultaneously reported that 2.5 million people were affected while a press director from PRASA rather estimated that number to be more near to 400,000. Water supply is being shut off for up to 48 hours when rationed. As the drought affected crops and livestock the U. S. Department of Agriculture started to provide emergency loans to certain municipalities, particularly to those in the Caguas valley who have entirely loss their harvests.

Major tourist areas are exempt from rationing and continue to function normally.

The water crisis comes at a time when Puerto Rico suffers a financial debt crisis, compromising its response to the drought. In addition, an economic recession has led hundreds of thousand of islanders to leave the island looking for work on the mainland, a phenomenon expected to intensify due to the rationing.

The last major water crisis in Puerto Rico was in 1994 when rationing was implemented as well.

== See also ==
- 2012–2013 North American drought
