= Puerto Rico Aqueduct and Sewer Authority =

Government-owned corporation of Puerto Rico

Puerto Rico Aqueduct and Sewer Authority Autoridad de Acueductos y Alcantarillados de Puerto Rico
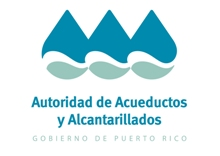

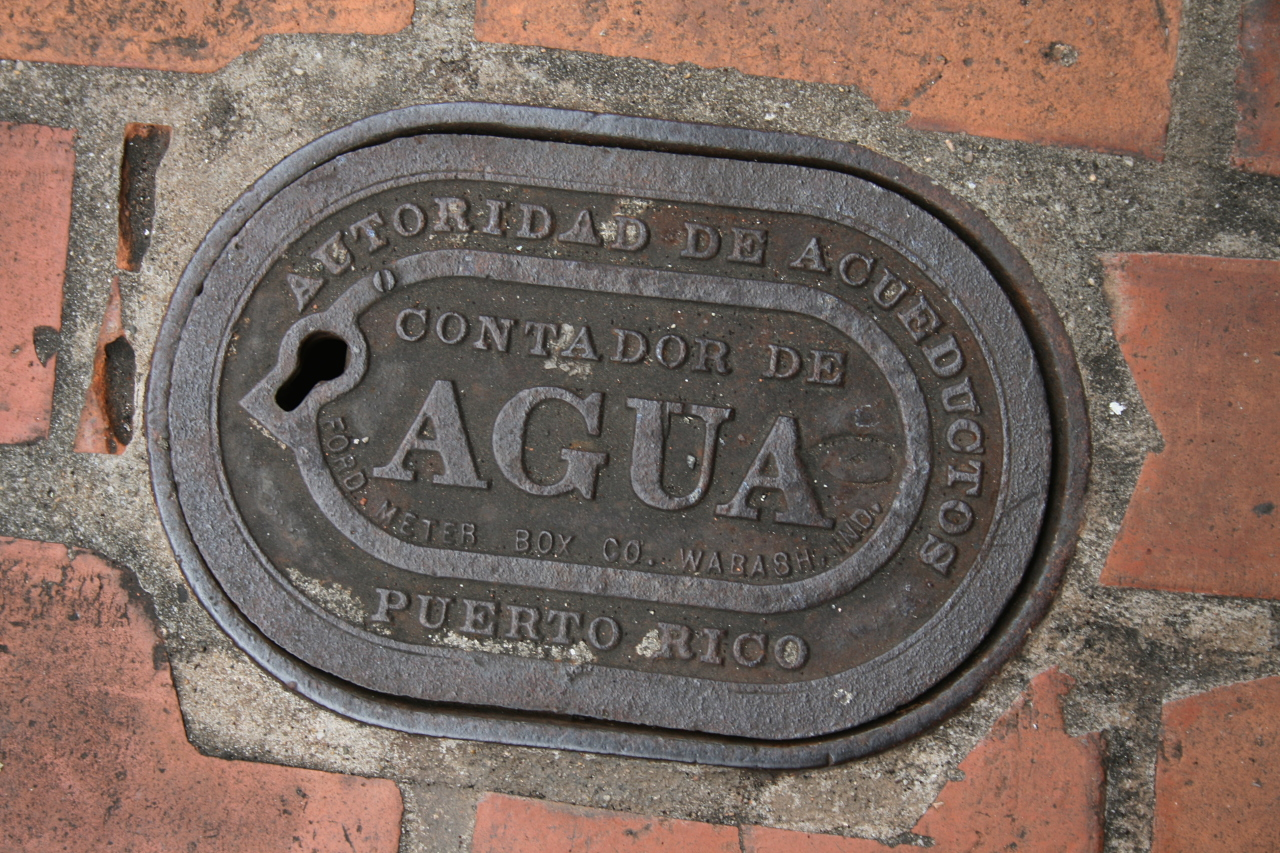
- Water meter cover in San Germán

Agency overview
- Formed: May 1, 1945; 81 years ago
- Jurisdiction: Commonwealth of Puerto Rico
- Headquarters: San Juan, PR
- Agency executive: Doriel I. Págan Crespo, Executive Director
- Key document: Law No. 40 of 1945
- Website: www.acueductospr.com

The Puerto Rico Aqueduct and Sewer Authority (PRASA; Spanish: Autoridad de Acueductos y Alcantarillados de Puerto Rico) is a water company and the government-owned corporation responsible for water quality, management, and supply in Puerto Rico, a US insular area. PRASA is the only entity authorized to conduct such business in Puerto Rico, effectively making it a government monopoly.

== History ==
The Puerto Rico Aqueduct and Sewer Authority was established by Law 40 of May 1, 1945.

In 1995 the agency was privatized under the administration of governor Pedro Rosselló until 2002 under governor Sila María Calderón when the contract ended.

The aftermath of Hurricane Maria left most of the island without water service for weeks. The agency announced in December, three months after the storm had passed, that the water service was restored to 90% of its clients. The authority was ordered by then governor Ricardo Rosselló to not charge for the service it was unable to provide during this period.

== Gallery ==
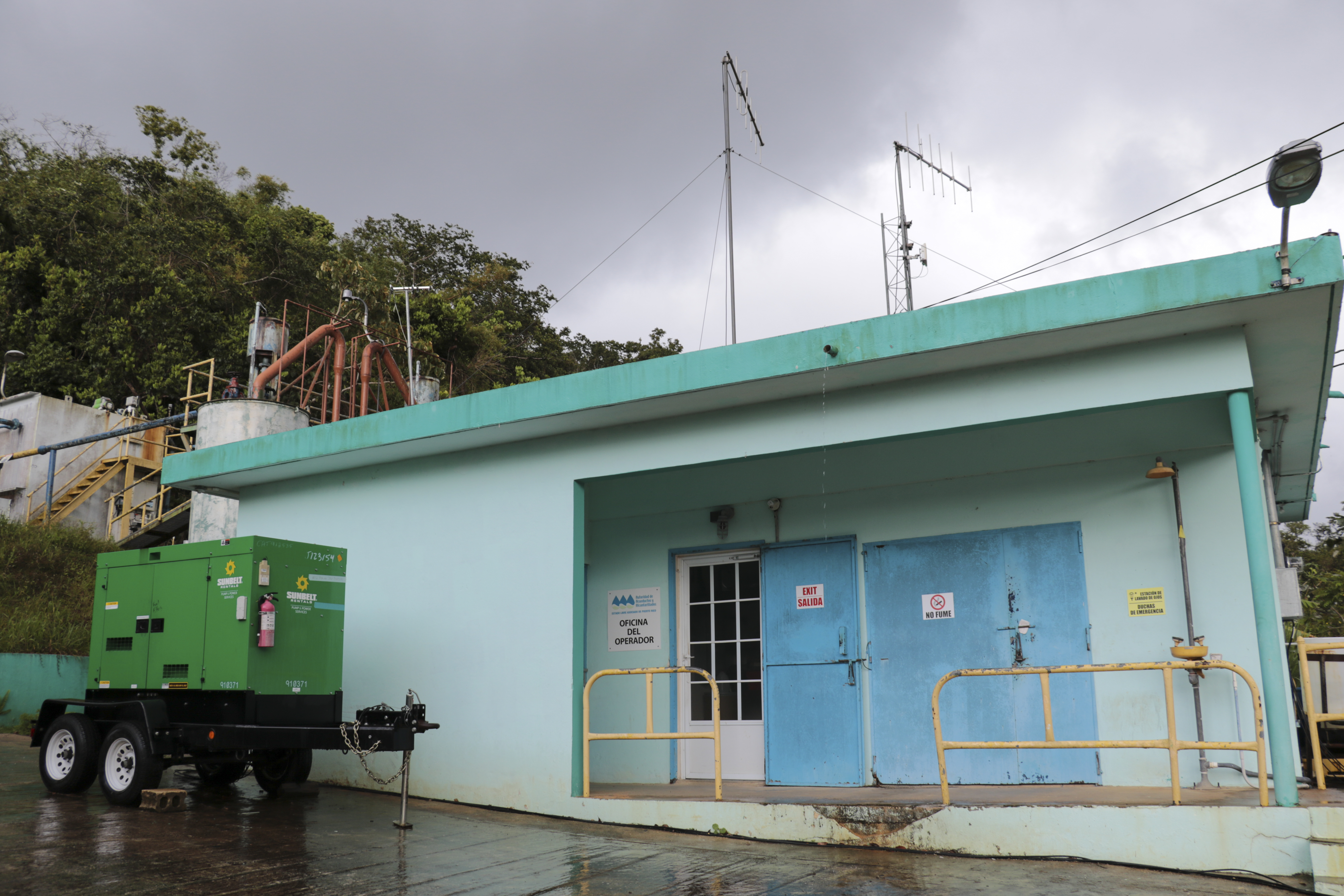
Critical infrastructure located in the mountains of Jayuya

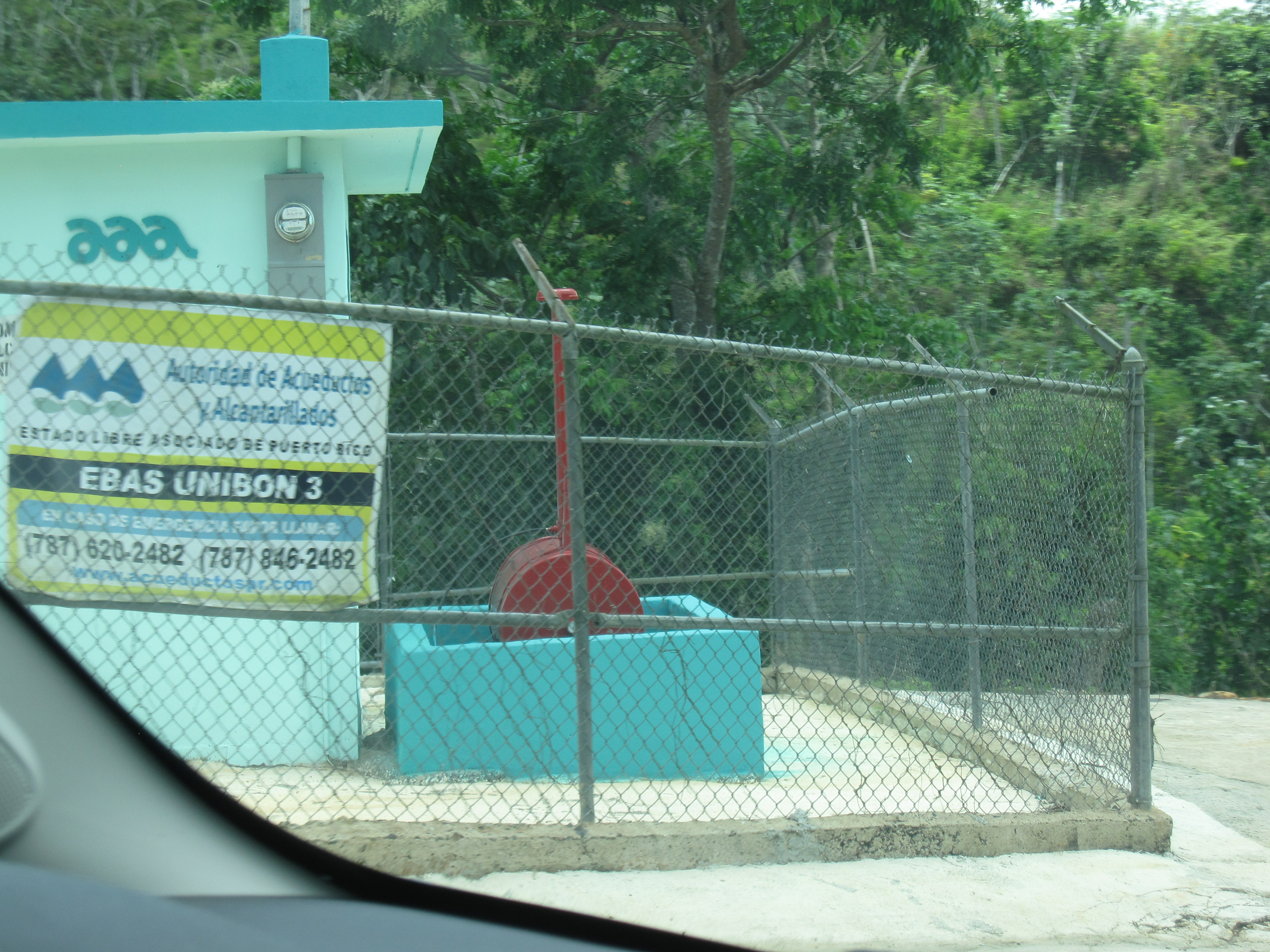
Puerto Rico Aqueduct and Sewer Authority in Unibón, Morovis

== See also ==
- 2015 Puerto Rican drought
