= Idol Puerto Rico season 1 =

Season of television series

Idol Puerto Rico
- Season 1
- Hosted by: Jaime Augusto Mayol
- Judges: Ricardo Montaner; Jerry Rivera; Erika Ender; Topy Mamery
- Winner: Christian Pagán
- Runner-up: Japhet Albert
- Finals venue: Centro de Bellas Artes de Caguas

Release
- Original network: WAPA-TV
- Original release: August 7 – November 21, 2011

Season chronology
- Next → Season 2

The first season of Idol Puerto Rico premiered on August 7, 2011 and continued until November 21, 2011. It was won by Christian Pagán. The season was hosted by Jaime Augusto Mayol. The winner, Christian Pagán, signed with Universal Music Group, the label in partnership with Idol Puerto Rico, and has released two albums.

== Selection process ==
=== Auditions ===
The show selected contestants from two auditions held on May 7, 2011 in the Juan Pachín Vicéns Auditorium at Ponce and May 14, 2011 in the Hiram Bithorn Stadium at San Juan; those auditions were presented on August 7 and August 9, 2011, respectively.

| Episode Air Date | Audition City | Audition Venue | Tickets to Theater Level |
| August 7, 2011 | San Juan | Hiram Bithorn Stadium | 40 |
| August 9, 2011 | Ponce | Juan Pachín Vicéns Auditorium | 40 |
| Total Tickets to the Theater Level | | | 80 |

=== Theater level ===
The "Theater Level" auditions were broadcast on August 15, 2011 on a special program called Idol Puerto Rico - Theatre Edition. During this audition, the 80 contestants sang individually in front of the judges. They were then evaluated in groups of eight to gradually reduce the number. Those selected got to choose a partner to sing a duet. The jury listened each pair and eliminated several contestants. For the final round of this stage of the competition, the contestants sang solo one more time. In the end, the judges chose the twenty-four semifinalists.

== Semi-finals ==
The semi-finals began with a total of 24 contestants. They were broadcast on August 29–30, 2011. After the semi-finals, 12 of the contestants were eliminated, leaving the remaining 12 for the Finals.

== Finals ==
The finals began on September 12, 2011 with 12 contestants, and lasted 10 weeks. One finalist was eliminated per week based on the public's votes.

== Elimination chart ==
Legend
| Did Not Perform | Female | Male | Semi | Finalists | Winner |

| Safe | First Save | Second Save | Last Save | Eliminated |

| Stage: | | Semi | | Finals | | | | | | | | | |
| Week: | | 08/29 | 08/30 | 09/12 | 09/19 | 09/26 | 10/03 | 10/10 | 10/17 | 10/24 | 10/31 | 11/07 | 11/21 |
| Place | Contestants | Results | | | | | | | | | | | |
| 1 | Christian Pagán | Top 6 | | | Btm 2 | | | | | | | Btm 2 | Winner |
| 2 | Japhet Albert | Top 6 | | | | | | | Btm 3 | | | | Runner-Up |
| 3 | Joseph Ojeda | Top 6 | | | | Btm 3 | | | | | | Elim | |
| 4 | Glendaliz Maldonado | | Top 6 | | | | | | | Btm 3 | Elim | | |
| 5 | Alex Rivera | Top 6 | | | | | | | | Btm 2 | Elim | | |
| 6 | Yeidimar Ramos | | Top 6 | Btm 2 | | | Btm 2 | Btm 3 | Btm 2 | Elim | | | |
| 7 | Kathyenid Rivera | | Top 6 | | | Btm 2 | | Btm 3 | Elim | | | | |
| 8 | Luis Adrián Cortés | Top 6 | | | | | Btm 3 | Elim | | | | | |
| 9 | Luis Xavier Zayas | Top 6 | | | Btm 3 | | Elim | | | | | | |
| 10 | Dianne de Jesús | | Top 6 | | | Elim | | | | | | | |
| 11 | Mary Ann Acevedo | | Top 6 | Btm 3 | Elim | | | | | | | | |
| 12 | Limariette González | | Top 6 | Elim | | | | | | | | | |
| Semi | Amanda Rivera | | Elim | | | | | | | | | | |
| Semi | Angela Flecha | | Elim | | | | | | | | | | |
| Semi | Aracelis Torres | | Elim | | | | | | | | | | |
| Semi | Glenda Morales | | Elim | | | | | | | | | | |
| Semi | Ivelisse Fermín | | Elim | | | | | | | | | | |
| Semi | Krystal Olmeda | | Elim | | | | | | | | | | |
| Semi | César S. Flores | Elim | | | | | | | | | | | |
| Semi | Elisamuel Rivera | Elim | | | | | | | | | | | |
| Semi | José Bordonada | Elim | | | | | | | | | | | |
| Semi | José Mario Reyes | Elim | | | | | | | | | | | |
| Semi | Jovani Vázquez | Elim | | | | | | | | | | | |
| Semi | Khalil Quintero | Elim | | | | | | | | | | | |
