= Idol Puerto Rico season 2 =

Idol Puerto Rico
- Season 2
- Hosted by: Jaime Augusto Mayol
- Judges: Ricardo Montaner; Topy Mamery; Yolandita Monge
- Winner: Gremal Maldonado
- Runner-up: Juan Carlos Avilés
- Finals venue: Centro de Bellas Artes de Caguas

Release
- Original network: WAPA-TV
- Original release: July 29 – November 12, 2012

Season chronology
- ← Previous; Season 1

The second season of Idol Puerto Rico premiered on July 29, 2012, and ended on November 12, 2012. Like the previous season, it is hosted by Jaime Augusto Mayol. The victory went to Gremal Maldonado. Its origin is Dominican-Puerto Rican.

== Selection process ==
=== Auditions ===
The show selected contestants from two auditions held on April 28, 2012, in the Juan Pachín Vicéns Auditorium at Ponce and May 5, 2012, in the Hiram Bithorn Stadium at San Juan; those auditions were presented on July 29–31, 2012. As part of the premiere, WAPA TV presented a primetime special.

| Episode Air Date | Audition City | Audition Venue | Tickets to Theater Level |
| July 29, 2012 | Ponce | Juan Pachín Vicéns Auditorium | 40 |
| July 31, 2012 | San Juan | Hiram Bithorn Stadium | 40 |
| Total Tickets to the Theater Level | | | 80 |

=== Theater level ===
During the "Theater Level" auditions, the selected contestants sang individually in front of the judges. They were then evaluated in groups to gradually reduce the number. The jury listened each pair and eliminated several contestants. In the end, the judges chose the twenty-four semifinalists.

== Semi-finals ==
The semi-finals featured a total of 24 contestants. After the semi-finals, 12 of the contestants were eliminated, leaving the remaining 12 for the Finals.

=== Females ===
- Alpha Berrios, 16, Toa Baja
- Aivelyn Diaz, 26, Toa Baja
- Celimar Lopes, 17, Salinas
- Fabiola Ramos, 25, Ponce
- Genesis Ramirez, 19, San Juan
- Gremal Maldonado, 17, Salinas
- Ivelisse Fermin, 26, Trujilo Alto
- Karla Arroyo, 16, Juana Diaz
- Kelly Romero, 18, Gurabo
- Leslie Crespo, 26, San Juan
- Tania Roman, 27, Carolina
- Xenia Rivera, 21, Gurabo

=== Males ===
- Abimelec Torres, 23, San Sebastian
- Alex Rosado, 20, Vega Alta
- Angel Rodriguez, 25, Cayey
- Carlos Jimenez, 26, Carozal
- Carlos Valls, 23, San Juan
- Ismael Estepa, 21, Bayamon
- Jonathan Echevarria, 21, Rio Grande
- Juan Aviles, 26, Coamo
- Micheal Rivera, 27, Humacao
- David Garcia 19, San Juan
- Roberto Escobar, 21, Ponce

== Finals ==
The finals began on September 3, 2012, with 12 contestants and are scheduled to end on November 12, 2012. One finalist was eliminated per week based on the public's votes.

=== First Gala: September 3, 2012 ===
During the first gala, contestants performed a variety of pop songs from various Latin artists.

| Order | Contestant | Song (original artist if applicable) | Result |
|---|---|---|---|
| 1 | Génesis Ramírez | "Ya no quiero" (Jesse & Joy) | Bottom 3 |
| 2 | Roberto Escobar | "Tú de qué vas" (Franco De Vita) | Safe |
| 3 | Kelly Romero | "Me río de tí" (Gloria Trevi) | Safe |
| 4 | Abimelec Torres | "Un siglo sin tí" (Chayanne) | Safe |
| 5 | Fabiola Ramos | "Lo mejor de mi vida eres tú" (Ricky Martin) | Safe |
| 6 | Michael Rivera | "Inolvidable" (Reik) | Safe |
| 7 | Celimar López | "Feliz" (Kany García) | Safe |
| 8 | Alex Rosado | "¿De qué me sirve la vida?" (Camila) | Safe |
| 9 | Gremal Maldonado | "Tan enamorados" (Ricardo Montaner) | Safe |
| 10 | Carlos Jiménez | "Te mando flores" (Fonseca) | Eliminated |
| 11 | Alpha Berríos | "Día de suerte" (Alejandra Guzmán) | Bottom 3 |
| 12 | Juan Carlos Avilés | "Esclavo de sus besos" (David Bisbal) | Safe |

- Group performance: "Tu piano y mi guitarra" (Ricardo Montaner)

=== Second Gala: September 10, 2012 ===
- Guest performer: Prince Royce

During the second gala, contestants performed songs from several Latin pop singers.

| Order | Contestant | Song (original artist if applicable) | Result |
|---|---|---|---|
| 1 | Alex Rosado | "Momentos" (Noel Schajris) | Safe |
| 2 | Alpha Berríos | "Daría" (La 5ª Estación) | Safe |
| 3 | Génesis Ramírez | "Que te pedí" (La Lupe) | Safe |
| 4 | Abimelec Torres | "Te llamé" (Cristian Castro) | Safe |
| 5 | Kelly Romero | "Dos eternidades" (Ednita Nazario) | Safe |
| 6 | Roberto Escobar | "Fuego de noche, Nieve de día" (Ricky Martin) | Safe |
| 7 | Juan Carlos Avilés | "Desnúdate, mujer" (David Bisbal) | Safe |
| 8 | Celimar López | "Ahora soy mala" (Olga Tañon) | Eliminated |
| 9 | Michael Rivera | "Perdóname" (Luis Fonsi) | Bottom 3 |
| 10 | Fabiola Ramos | "Buenos amigos" (Selena) | Safe |
| 11 | Gremal Maldonado | "Simplemente amigos" (Ana Gabriel) | Bottom 3 |

=== Third Gala: September 17, 2012 ===
The third gala had the contestants performing songs from various tropical genres like Salsa, merengue, and others.

| Order | Contestant | Song (original artist if applicable) | Result |
|---|---|---|---|
| 1 | Juan Carlos Avilés | "¿Ahora quien?" (Marc Anthony) | Safe |
| 2 | Génesis Ramírez | "Estúpida" (La India) | Eliminated |
| 3 | Michael Rivera | "Creo en el amor" (Rey Ruiz) | Bottom 3 |
| 4 | Alpha Berríos | "Mi bendición" (Juan Luis Guerra) | Safe |
| 5 | Abimelec Torres | "¿Que precio tiene el cielo?" (Marc Anthony) | Safe |
| 6 | Gremal Maldonado | "Toma mi vida" (Milly Quezada) | Safe |
| 7 | Alex Rosado | "Valió la pena" (Marc Anthony) | Safe |
| 8 | Fabiola Ramos | "A puro dolor" (Son by Four) | Safe |
| 9 | Roberto Escobar | "El malo" (Aventura) | Bottom 3 |
| 10 | Kelly Romero | "Entre tu cuerpo y el mío" (Milly Quezada) | Safe |

=== Fourth Gala: September 24, 2012 ===
The fourth gala featured songs within the Latin rock (or Rock en Español) genre. Also, it was announced that contestant Roberto Escobar had been disqualified from the competition for inappropriate conduct.

| Order | Contestant | Song (original artist if applicable) | Result |
|---|---|---|---|
| 1 | Kelly Romero | "Volveré" (Jesse & Joy) | Safe |
| 2 | Juan Carlos Avilés | "Tú lo sabes bien" (Black Guayaba) | Bottom 4 |
| 3 | Alex Rosado | "La cosa más bella" (Eros Ramazzotti) | Bottom 3 |
| 4 | Abimelec Torres | "Mentira" (La Ley) | Eliminated |
| 5 | Fabiola Ramos | "La niña que llora en tus fiestas" (La Oreja de Van Gogh) | Safe |
| 6 | Alpha Berríos | "No te mentía" (Ednita Nazario) | Bottom 4 |
| 7 | Michael Rivera | "Tarde o temprano" (Tommy Torres) | Bottom 4 |
| 8 | Gremal Maldonado | "Que te quería" (La 5ª Estación) | Safe |

=== Fifth Gala: October 1, 2012 ===
The fifth gala was titled "Top of the Charts Night" and it featured interpretations of songs that topped the US charts at some time.

| Order | Contestant | Song (original artist if applicable) | Result |
|---|---|---|---|
| 1 | Fabiola Ramos | "If I Ain't Got You" (Alicia Keys) | Bottom 4 |
| 2 | Juan Carlos Avilés | "How Am I Supposed to Live Without You" (Michael Bolton) | Bottom 4 |
| 3 | Michael Rivera | "La Incondicional" (Luis Miguel) | Bottom 3 |
| 4 | Gremal Maldonado | "I Have Nothing" (Whitney Houston) | Safe |
| 5 | Kelly Romero | "Stronger (What Doesn't Kill You)" (Kelly Clarkson) | Eliminated |
| 6 | Alpha Berríos | "Someone Like You" (Adele) | Safe |
| 7 | Alex Rosado | "Back at One" (Brian McKnight) | Bottom 4 |

=== Sixth Gala: October 8, 2012 ===
- Guest performer: Daddy Yankee

The sixth gala featured a guest performance from Daddy Yankee, who performed his new hit "Pasarela".

| Order | Contestant | Song (original artist if applicable) | Result |
|---|---|---|---|
| 1 | Alex Rosado | "Te voy a amar" (Axel) | Safe |
| 2 | Michael Rivera | "Tu mirada" (Reik) | Eliminated |
| 3 | Gremal Maldonado | "La pasión tiene memoria" (Ednita Nazario) | Safe |
| 4 | Juan Carlos Avilés | "Quién como tú" (Noel Schajris) | Bottom 3 |
| 5 | Fabiola Ramos | "Tanto amor" (Shaila Dúrcal) | Bottom 3 |
| 6 | Alpha Berríos | "¿Con quien se queda el perro?" (Jesse & Joy) | Safe |

=== Seventh Gala: October 15, 2012 ===
- Guest judge: Kany García

The seventh gala was dubbed "Acoustic Night", and each contestant performed two songs. Also, Ricardo Montaner couldn't serve as judge, and singer Kany García served as guest judge for the night.

| Order | Contestant | Song (original artist if applicable) | Result |
|---|---|---|---|
| 1 | Alpha Berríos | "Sueños rotos" (La 5ª Estación) | Safe |
| 2 | Juan Carlos Avilés | "Guapa" (Diego Torres) | Safe |
| 3 | Fabiola Ramos | "¿Que nos pasó?" (Yuridia & Reyli) | Eliminated |
| 4 | Alex Rosado | "Sirena" (Sin Bandera) | Safe |
| 5 | Gremal Maldonado | "Equivocada" (Thalía) | Safe |
| 6 | Alpha Berríos | "Imprescindible" (Beyoncé) | Safe |
| 7 | Juan Carlos Avilés | "Te tengo o te perdí" (Juan Vélez) | Safe |
| 8 | Fabiola Ramos | "Si tu no estás" (Franco De Vita) | Eliminated |
| 9 | Alex Rosado | "Si yo fuera tú" (Servando & Florentino) | Safe |
| 10 | Gremal Maldonado | "Se me va la voz" (Alejandro Fernández) | Safe |

=== Eight Gala: October 22, 2012 ===
The eight gala was dedicated to judges Ricardo Montaner and Yolandita Monge. Each of the four remaining contestants performed two songs from them, with the males singing Montaner's songs and the females singing from Monge's repertoire.

| Order | Contestant | Song (original artist if applicable) | Result |
|---|---|---|---|
| 1 | Alex Rosado | "Déjame llorar" (Ricardo Montaner) | Eliminated |
| 2 | Alpha Berríos | "Sobreviviré" (Yolandita Monge) | Safe |
| 3 | Juan Carlos Avilés | "En el último lugar del mundo" (Ricardo Montaner) | Safe |
| 4 | Gremal Maldonado | "Débil" (Yolandita Monge) | Safe |
| 5 | Alex Rosado | "Castillo azul" (Ricardo Montaner) | Eliminated |
| 6 | Alpha Berríos | "Como puedes" (Yolandita Monge) | Safe |
| 7 | Juan Carlos Avilés | "Me va a extrañar" (Ricardo Montaner) | Safe |
| 8 | Gremal Maldonado | "Quítame ese hombre" (Yolandita Monge) | Safe |

=== Ninth Gala: October 29, 2012 ===
- Guest artist: Gilberto Santa Rosa

| Order | Contestant | Song (original artist if applicable) | Result |
|---|---|---|---|
| 1 | Juan Carlos Avilés | "Corazón partío" (Alejandro Sanz) | Safe |
| 2 | Alpha Berríos | "Cinco minutos" (Gloria Trevi) | Eliminated |
| 3 | Gremal Maldonado | "Como olvidar" ([Olga Tañón]) | Safe |
| 4 | Juan Carlos Avilés | "Muy Dentro de Mi" (Marc Anthony) | Safe |
| 5 | Alpha Berríos | "Antes" (Obie Bermúdez) | Eliminated |
| 6 | Gremal Maldonado | "Tu peor error" (La 5ª Estación) | Safe |

=== Tenth Gala: November 5, 2012 ===
- Guest artist: Tommy Torres

The ninth gala was the last one before the final. No participant was eliminated from the competition during the gala. Gremal and Juan Carlos sang two unreleased songs and one in honor of the guest judge, Tommy Torres.

| Order | Contestant | Song (original artist if applicable) | Result |
|---|---|---|---|
| 1 | Gremal Maldonado | "Caminando" | Safe |
| 2 | Juan Carlos Avilés | "He Ganado" | Safe |
| 3 | Gremal Maldonado | "Dame esta noche" (Tommy Torres) | Safe |
| 4 | Juan Carlos Avilés | "Tarde o temprano" (Tommy Torres) | Safe |
| 5 | Gremal Maldonado | "He Ganado" | Safe |
| 6 | Juan Carlos Avilés | "Caminando" | Safe |

=== Final Gala: November 12, 2012 ===
- Guest artist: Carlos Vives, Elvis Crespo, Erika Ender, Christian Pagán, Kany García, Yolandita Monge and Ricardo Montaner

| Order | Contestant | Song (original artist if applicable) | Result |
|---|---|---|---|
| 1 | Juan Carlos Avilés | "La Cima del Cielo" (Ricardo Montaner) | Runner-Up |
| 2 | Gremal Maldonado | "Si Tu Eres Mi Hombre" (La India) | Winner |
| 3 | Juan Carlos Avilés & Gremal Maldonado | "Vivir lo Nuestro" (Marc Anthony & La India) | N/A |
| 4 | Juan Carlos Avilés & Gremal Maldonado with Carlos Vives | "Fruta Fresca" (Carlos Vives) | N/A |

- Group performance: "Tu piano y mi guitarra" (Ricardo Montaner), "Sigo Caminando" with Erika Ender.

== Elimination chart ==
| Did Not Perform | Safe | Safe First | Safe Last | Eliminated | Judges' Save | Winner |

| Stage: | | Finals | | | | | | | | | |
| Date: | | 10/9 | 17/9 | 24/9 | 1/10 | 8/10 | 15/10 | 22/10 | 29/10 | 5/11 | 12/11 |
| Rank | Contestant | Result | | | | | | | | | |
| 1 | Gremal Maldonado | Bottom 3 | | | | | | | Bottom 2 | Safe^{2} | Winner |
| 2 | Juan Avilés | | | Bottom 3 | | Bottom 2 | Bottom 3 | Bottom 2 | | Safe^{2} | Runner-up |
| 3 | Alpha | | | Bottom 4 | | | | | Eliminated | | |
| 4 | David Garcia | | | | Bottom 4 | | Bottom 2 | Eliminated | | | |
| 5 | Fabiola Ramos | | | | Bottom 3 | Bottom 3 | Eliminated | | | | |
| 6 | Michael Rivera | Bottom 2 | Bottom 2 | Bottom 2 | Bottom 2 | Eliminated | | | | | |
| 7 | Kelly Romero | | | | Eliminated | | | | | | |
| 8 | Abimelec Torres | | | Eliminated | | | | | | | |
| 9 | Roberto Escobar | | Bottom 3 | Disqualified^{1} | | | | | | | |
| 10 | Génesis Ramirez | | Eliminated | | | | | | | | |
| 11 | Celimar López | Eliminated | | | | | | | | | |
| 12 | Carlos Jimenez | | | | | | | | | | |

^Note 1 : Roberto Escobar had been disqualified from the competition for inappropriate conduct.
^Note 2 : No participant was eliminated from the competition during the gala. Gremal and Juan Carlos sang two unreleased songs and one in honor of the guest judge, Tommy Torres.
