= Idol Kids Puerto Rico season 1 =

Idol Kids Puerto Rico
- Season 1
- Hosted by: Carlos Ponce
- Judges: Erika Ender; Edgardo Diaz; Florentino Primera; Servando Primera
- Winner: Edgard Hernández
- Runner-up: Alexey Badillo
- Finals venue: Centro de Bellas Artes de Caguas

Release
- Original network: WAPA-TV
- Original release: August 5 – November 12, 2012

The first season of Idol Kids Puerto Rico premiered on August 5, 2012 and aired until November 12, 2012. It was won by 12-year-old Edgard Hernández and was hosted by Carlos Ponce. Hernández received a scholarship of $15,000 and $5,000 in cash, among other prizes.

== Selection process ==
=== Auditions ===
Kids from all over Puerto Rico were invited to audition. The age limit was 6–12 years old.

== Semi-finals ==
The semi-finals began with a total of 20 contestants. In the first semi-final the ten girls competed and five went on to the final rounds. The next semi-final saw the ten boys competing.

The following is a list of Top 20 semi-finalists who failed to reach the finals:

Girls			Boys		
Contestant	Age at time of show	Hometown	Contestant	Age at time of show	Hometown
Adazaresh Hernández	9	Tao Baja, Puerto Rico	Alejandro Coll	11	Bayamón, Puerto Rico
Andrea Rivera	11	Bayamón, Puerto Rico	Christian Gonzalo	10	San Juan, Puerto Rico
Jennifer Ruby	9	Arroyo, Puerto Rico	Javier Centeno	12	Bayamón, Puerto Rico
Sheilmarie Gonzalez	12	Moca, Puerto Rico	Jorge Cruz	11	Trujillo Alto, Puerto Rico
Zaiya Valentin	10	Naranjito, Puerto Rico	Ricardo Ramirez	10	Ponce, Puerto Rico

== Finals ==
The following is a list of the contestants who were successful in making the top 10 finals:

Girls			Boys		
Contestant	Age at time of show	Hometown	Contestant	Age at time of show	Hometown
Alleannemarie Ponce	11	Ponce, Puerto Rico	Adiel Burgos	10	Toa Alta, Puerto Rico
Daniella Cott	11	San Juan, Puerto Rico	Alexey Badillo	9	Juana Díaz, Puerto Rico
Melanie Velez	10	Ciales, Puerto Rico	Edgar Hernández	12	Lajas, Puerto Rico
Rocío Munoz	9	Juana Díaz, Puerto Rico	Jonatán Rivera	12	Carolina, Puerto Rico
Ruth Morales	8	Aguas Buenas, Puerto Rico	Sebastián Gonzalez	8	Ciales, Puerto Rico

=== Elimination chart ===
Did Not Perform	Safe	Safe First	Safe Last	Eliminated	Winner

Stage:		Semi Finals		Finals								
Date:		08/27	09/03	09/10	09/17	09/24	10/01	10/08	10/15	10/22	11/05	11/12
Rank	Contestant	Result										
1	Edgar Hernández		Top 5			Bottom 2						Winner
2	Alexey Badillo		Top 5	Bottom 2						Bottom 2	Bottom 2	Runner-up
3	Adiel Burgos		Top 5						Bottom 2		Elim	
4	Ruth Morales	Top 5			Bottom 2		Bottom 2			Elim		
5	Jonatán Rivera		Top 5					Bottom 2	Elim			
6	Sebastián Gonzalez		Top 5					Elim				
7	Melanie Velez	Top 5					Elim					
8	Alleannemarie Ponce	Top 5				Elim						
9	Rocío Munoz	Top 5			Elim							
10	Daniella Cott	Top 5		Elim								
Semi	Alejandro Coll		Elim									
Semi	Christian Gonzalo		Elim									
Semi	Javier Centeno		Elim									
Semi	Jorge Cruz		Elim									
Semi	Ricardo Ramirez		Elim									
Semi	Adazaresh Hernández	Elim										
Semi	Andrea Rivera	Elim										
Semi	Jennifer Ruby	Elim										
Semi	Sheilmarie Gonzalez	Elim										
Semi	Zaiya Valentin	Elim										
