= Mayol =

Mayol may refer to:

== Buildings ==
- Stade Mayol, a multi-use stadium in Toulon, France

== People ==
- Alberto Mayol (born 1976), Chilean sociologist, political analyst, and politician
- Félix Mayol (1872-1941), French singer and entertainer
- Guillem Bauzà (born 1984), full name Guillermo Bauzà Mayol, Spanish footballer
- Jacques Mayol (1927–2001), French free diver
- Jaime Augusto Mayol (born 1980), American model
