= José Luis Cruz Cruz =

Puerto Rican politician

Mayor of Trujillo Alto
- In office January 12, 2009 – June 16, 2022
- Preceded by: Pedro Padilla
- Succeeded by: Pedro A. Rodríguez

Personal details
- Born: September 3, 1959 (age 67) Trujillo Alto, Puerto Rico
- Party: Popular Democratic Party (PPD)
- Spouse: Jeanette Cordero
- Children: Luis Manuel; José Luis
- Education: Metropolitan University

José Luis Cruz Cruz (born September 3, 1959) is a Puerto Rican politician and former mayor of Trujillo Alto. Cruz is affiliated with the Popular Democratic Party (PPD) and served as mayor from 2009 to 2022.

== Early years and studies ==
José Luis Cruz Cruz was born on September 3, 1959. He is the oldest son of Luis Benjamín Cruz Hernández and Aurea Cruz Betancourt. His grandfather, Luis Cruz Hernández, was mayor of Trujillo Alto from 1941 to 1945.

Cruz received his high school diploma from Colegio Santa Cruz in Trujillo Alto. He then completed a Bachelor's degree in Business Management with a major in accounting from the Metropolitan University. He also graduated from the Theologic Institute of the Sendero de la Cruz church.

== Public service ==
Cruz worked for 20 years for the Municipality of Trujillo Alto, serving as Director of the Municipal Housing Department, and of the Corporation for Economic Development of the city. He was also an Executive Aide to the mayor.

== Political career ==
Cruz began his political career in 2006 when he became President of the Municipal Committee of the Popular Democratic Party (PPD). In 2007, he was nominated by his party to run for mayor and succeeded at the 2008 general election. Cruz was sworn in on January 12, 2009.

Cruz was reelected in 2012, increasing his previous margin of victory by 10%.

In 2016, he was reelected for a third term. Cruz received 63% of the vote, decreasing his previous margin of victory by 4%.

In 2020, Cruz defeated Senator Eric Correa Rivera and received a fourth term. He won this time by only 9%, receiving 49% of the vote.

On June 16, 2022, they resigned as mayor of Trujillo Alto after 14 years in office. The resignation came after pleaded guilty to engaging in bribery scheme when the mayor received at least $10,000 in kickback payments. For several weeks in which the municipal legislature Trujillo Alto tried to meet with the mayor to demand answers about the allegations of corruption against him.

== Personal life ==
Cruz is married to Jeanette Cordero. They have two sons together: Luis Manuel and José Luis.
