= Trujillo Alto barrio-pueblo =

Historical and administrative center (seat) of Trujillo Alto, Puerto Rico

Trujillo Alto barrio-pueblo Pueblo de Trujillo Alto
- Municipality Seat
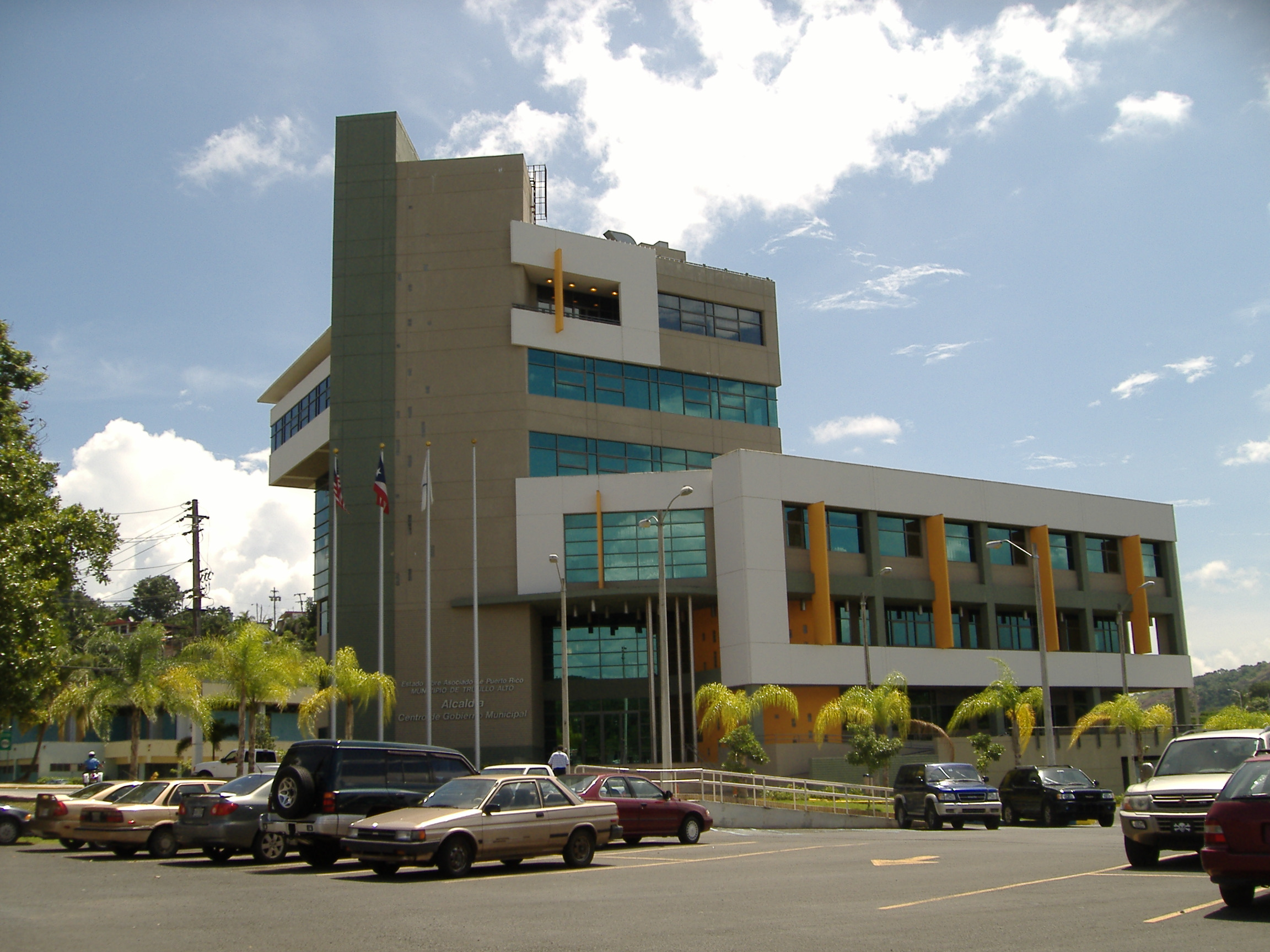
- Trujillo Alto City Hall

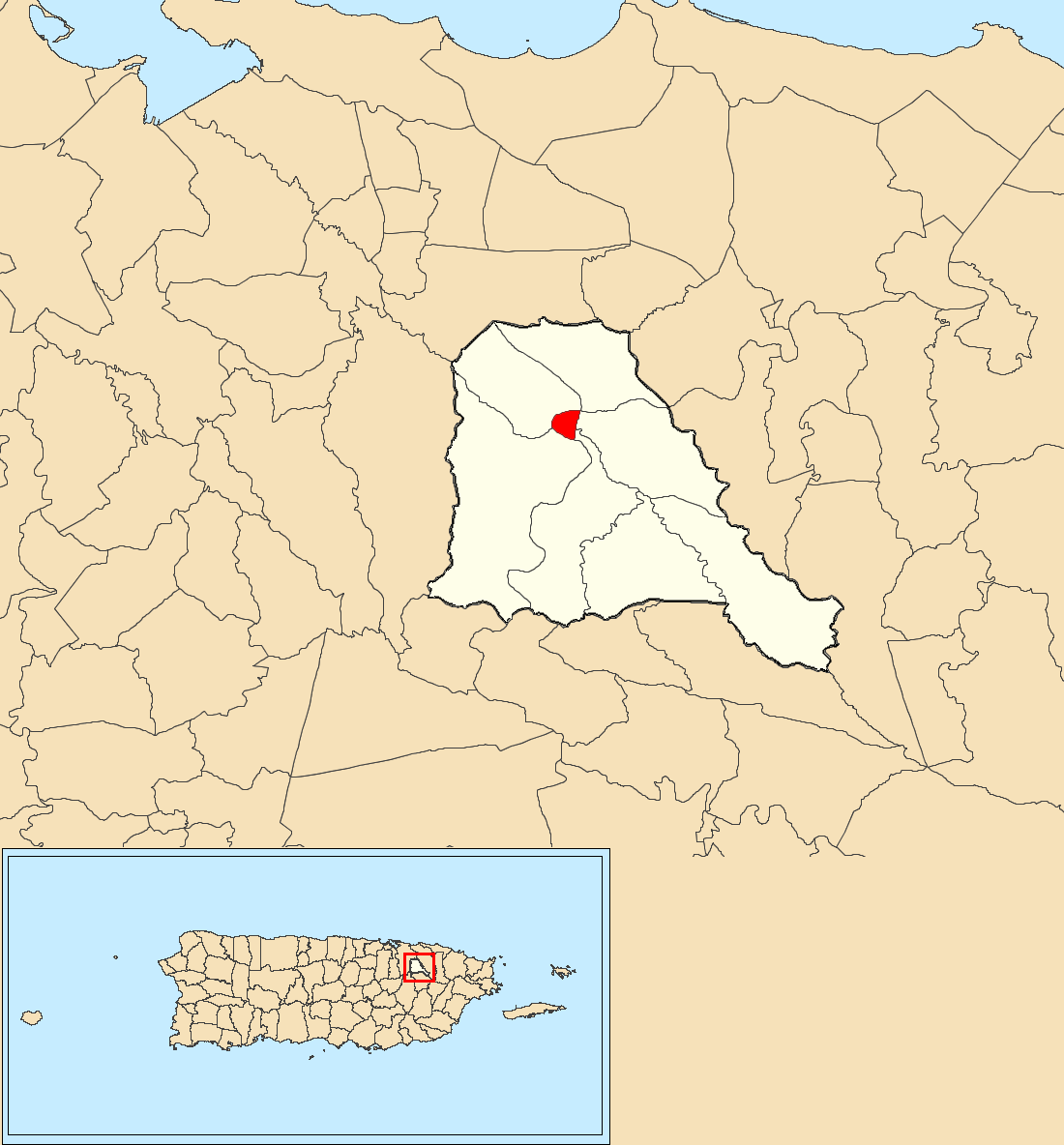
- Location of Trujillo Alto barrio-pueblo within the municipality of Trujillo Alto shown in red

- Location of Puerto Rico
- Coordinates: 18°21′15″N 66°00′25″W
- Commonwealth: Puerto Rico
- Municipality: Trujillo Alto

Area
  - Total: 0.15 sq mi (0.39 km^{2})
  - Land: 0.13 sq mi (0.34 km^{2})
  - Water: 0.02 sq mi (0.052 km^{2})
- Elevation: 72 ft (22 m)

Population (2010)
  - Total: 673
  - Density: 5,176.9/sq mi (1,998.8/km^{2})
- Source: 2010 Census
- Time zone: UTC−4 (AST)

Trujillo Alto barrio-pueblo is a barrio and the administrative center (seat) of Trujillo Alto, a municipality of Puerto Rico. Its population in 2010 was 673.

As was customary in Spain, in Puerto Rico, the municipality has a barrio called pueblo which contains a central plaza, the municipal buildings (city hall), and a Catholic church. Fiestas patronales (patron saint festivals) are held in the central plaza every year.

== The central plaza and its church ==
The central plaza, or square, is a place for official and unofficial recreational events and a place where people can gather and socialize from dusk to dawn. The Laws of the Indies, Spanish law, which regulated life in Puerto Rico in the early 19th century, stated the plaza's purpose was for "the parties" (celebrations, festivities) (Spanish: a propósito para las fiestas), and that the square should be proportionally large enough for the number of neighbors (Spanish: grandeza proporcionada al número de vecinos). These Spanish regulations also stated that the streets nearby should be comfortable portals for passersby, protecting them from the elements: sun and rain.

Located across the central plaza in Trujillo Alto barrio-pueblo is the Parroquia Exaltación de la Santa Cruz, a Roman Catholic church.

== History ==
Trujillo Alto barrio-pueblo was in Spain's gazetteers until Puerto Rico was ceded by Spain in the aftermath of the Spanish–American War under the terms of the Treaty of Paris of 1898 and became an unincorporated territory of the United States. In 1899, the United States Department of War conducted a census of Puerto Rico finding that the population of Trujillo Alto Pueblo was 1,025.

Historical population
Census	Pop.	Note	%±
1900	1,025		—
1910	573		−44.1%
1920	539		−5.9%
1930	903		67.5%
1940	1,014		12.3%
1950	1,082		6.7%
1960	1,297		19.9%
1970	0		−100.0%
1980	997		—
1990	984		−1.3%
2000	879		−10.7%
2010	673		−23.4%
U.S. Decennial Census; 1899 (shown as 1900) 1910-1930; 1930-1950 1980-2000 2010

== Festival ==
The annual Festival Del Macabeo is held in Trujillo Pueblo. The 39th edition of the event was held in 2019. The festival celebrates the macabeo, a local fried green banana treat. The festival and the dish is an important aspect of Trujillo Alto's culture and history.

== Gallery ==
Places in Trujillo Alto barrio-pueblo:

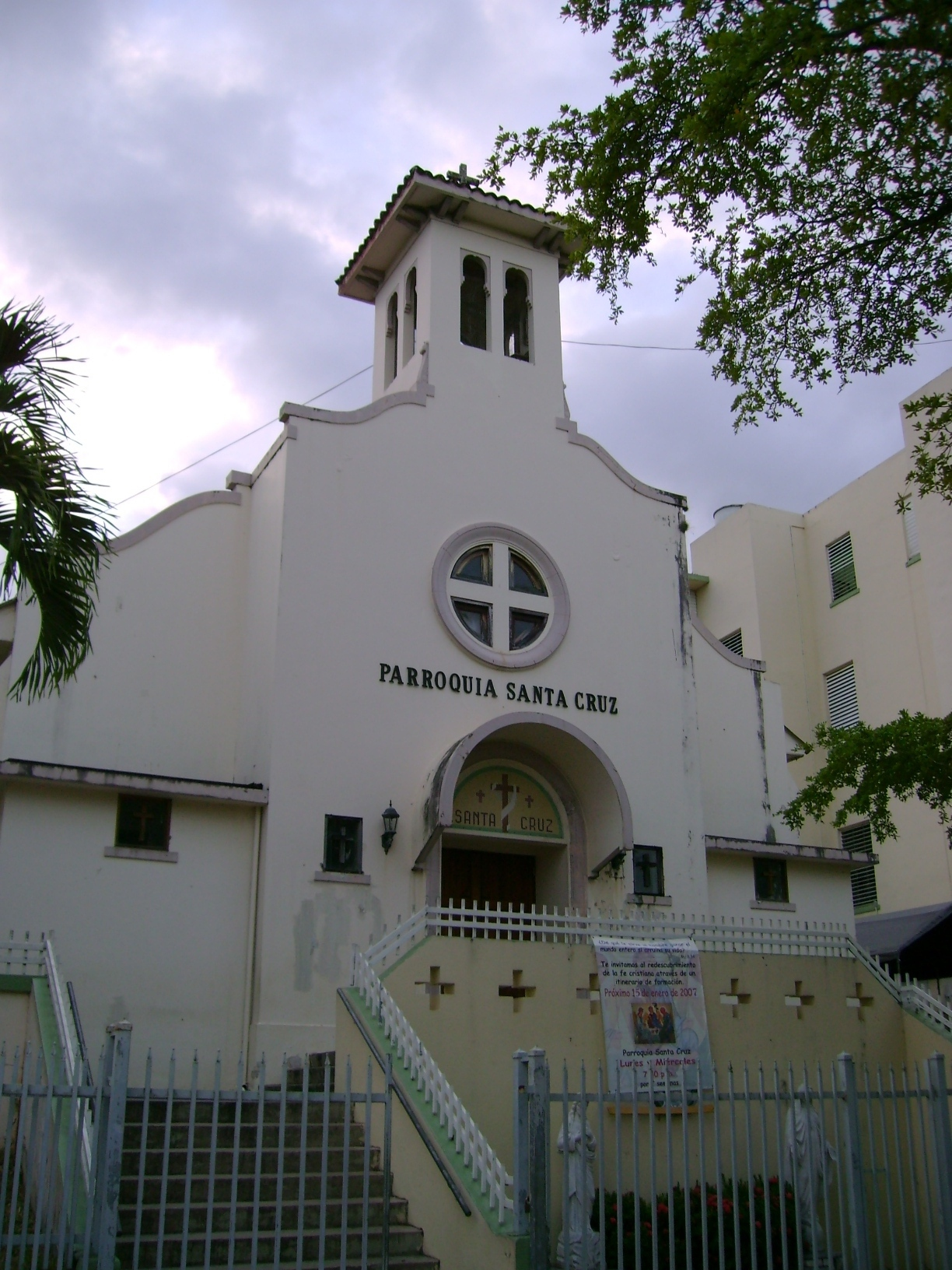
Parroquia Exaltación de la Santa Cruz

== See also ==
- List of communities in Puerto Rico
