= Puente de Trujillo Alto =

Historic bridge in Trujillo Alto, Puerto Rico

- U.S. National Register of Historic Places
- Puerto Rico Historic Sites and Zones
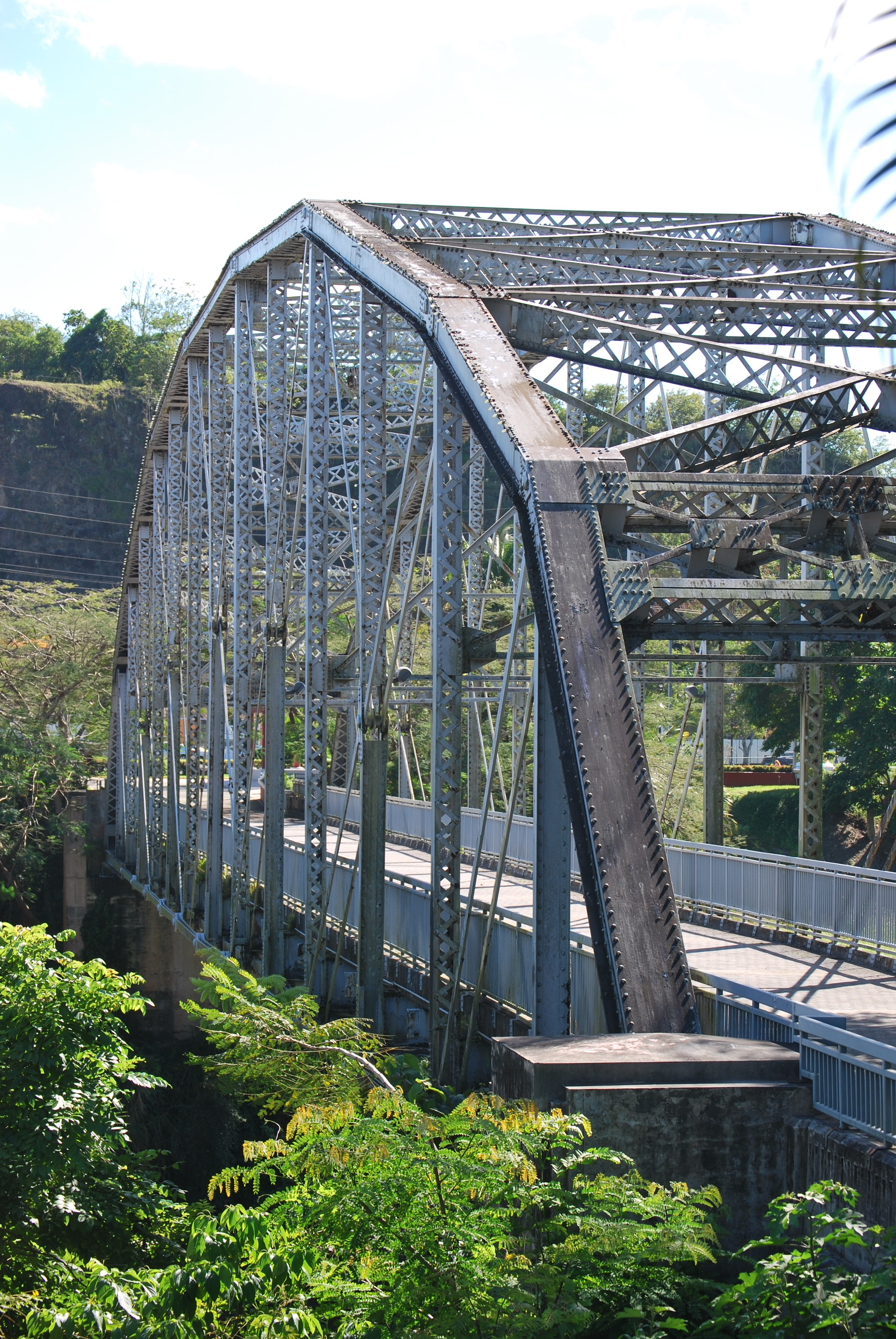

- Location within Puerto Rico
- Nearest city: Trujillo Alto, Puerto Rico
- Coordinates: 18°21′31″N 66°0′13″W
- Area: less than one acre
- Built: 1939-1941
- Engineer: Robert R. Prann
- Architectural style: Pennsylvania through truss
- MPS: Historic Bridges of Puerto Rico MPS
- NRHP reference No.: 09001289
- RNSZH No.: 2008-19-01-JP-SH

Significant dates
- Added to NRHP: January 28, 2010
- Designated RNSZH: October 6, 2008

The Puente de Trujillo Alto is a Pennsylvania through truss bridge built during 1939–1941 in Puerto Rico in the Trujillo Alto municipality of Puerto Rico. At was the longest single-span bridge in Puerto Rico.

The bridge construction was funded as part of the New Deal. The supporting structures and bridge were built by Robert Prann, an engineer who established private practice in Puerto Rico, with steel components manufactured by U.S. Steel.

Crossing 70 feet (21 m) above, it spans the Río Grande de Loíza, the largest river by volume in Puerto Rico. The height was intended to keep this bridge above flooding that had destroyed a previous bridge in 1936. However, in 1945 even this bridge was flooded over and almost carried away.

A four-lane concrete bridge was built adjacently during 1983-85 as a replacement, with the historic bridge being slated for demolition, but local protests led to its being kept.

== Gallery ==
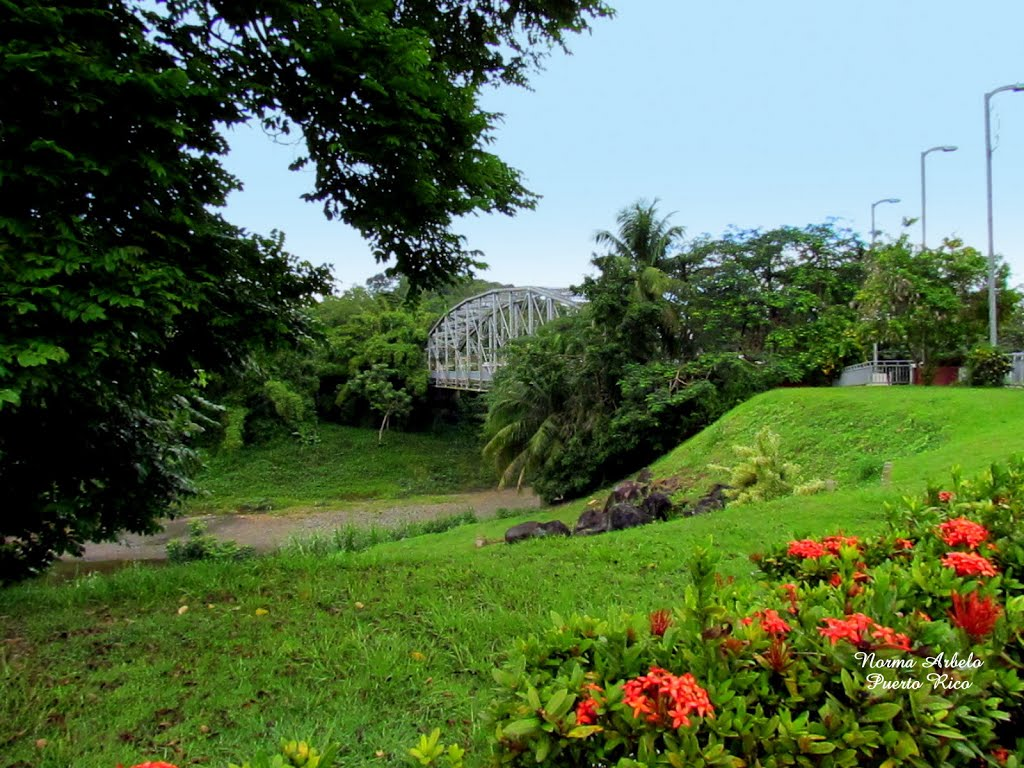
Historic bridge

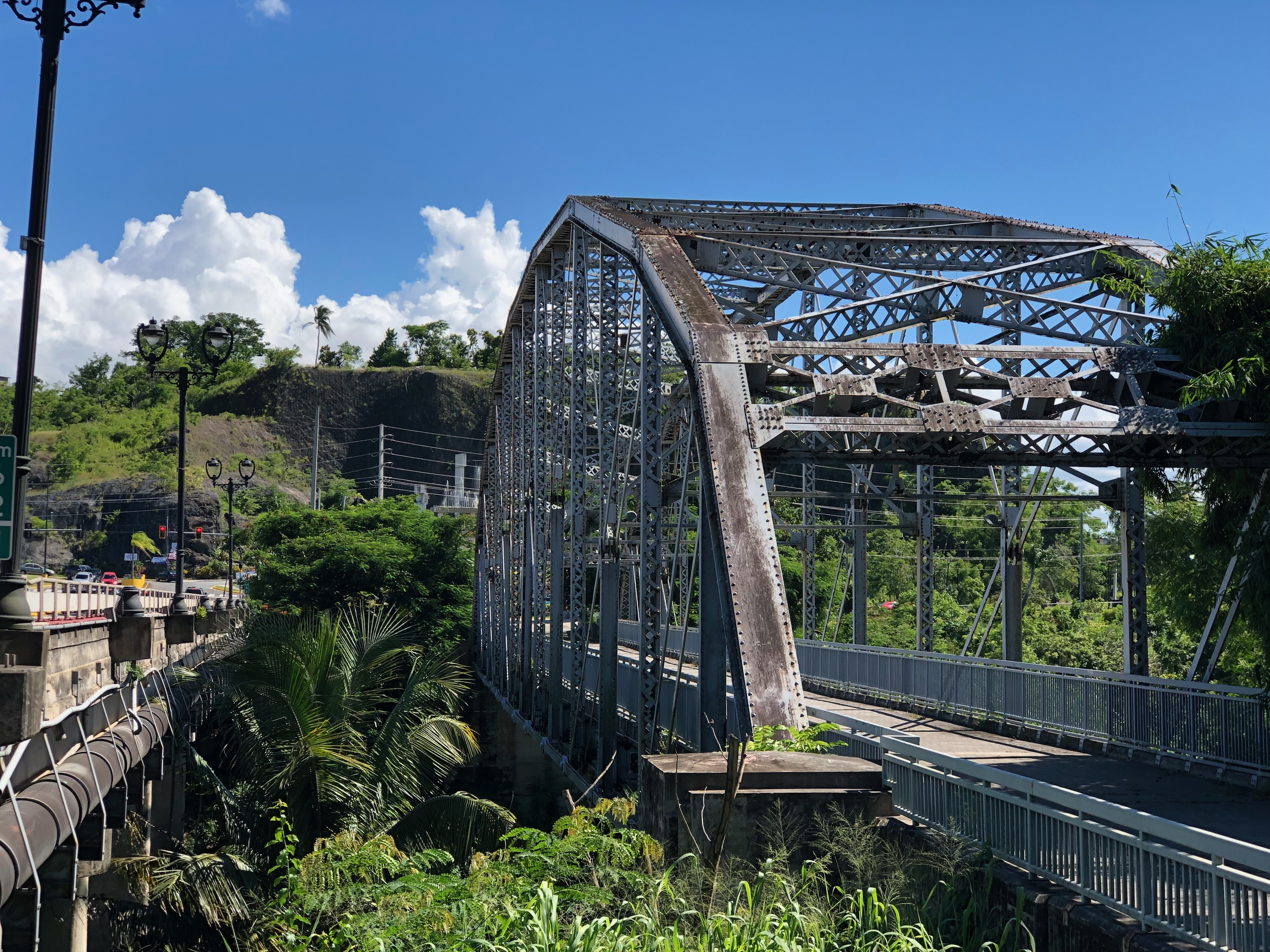
The bridge in 2018

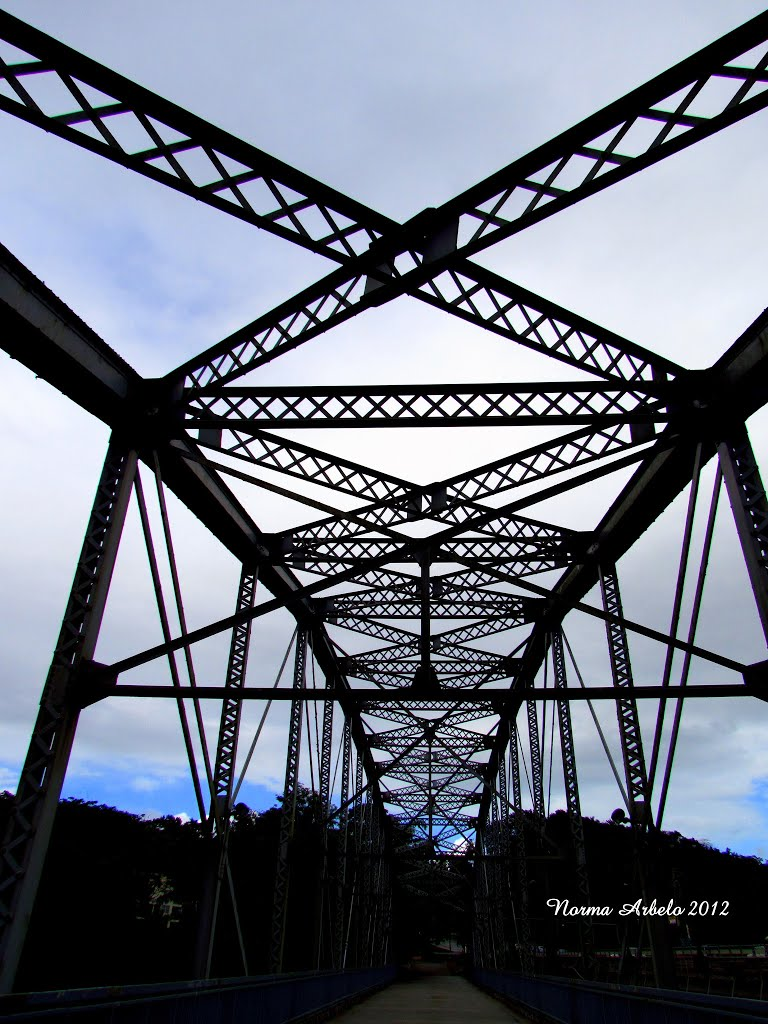
Detail of the bridge
