= La Gloria, Trujillo Alto, Puerto Rico =

Barrio of Puerto Rico

La Gloria
- Barrio
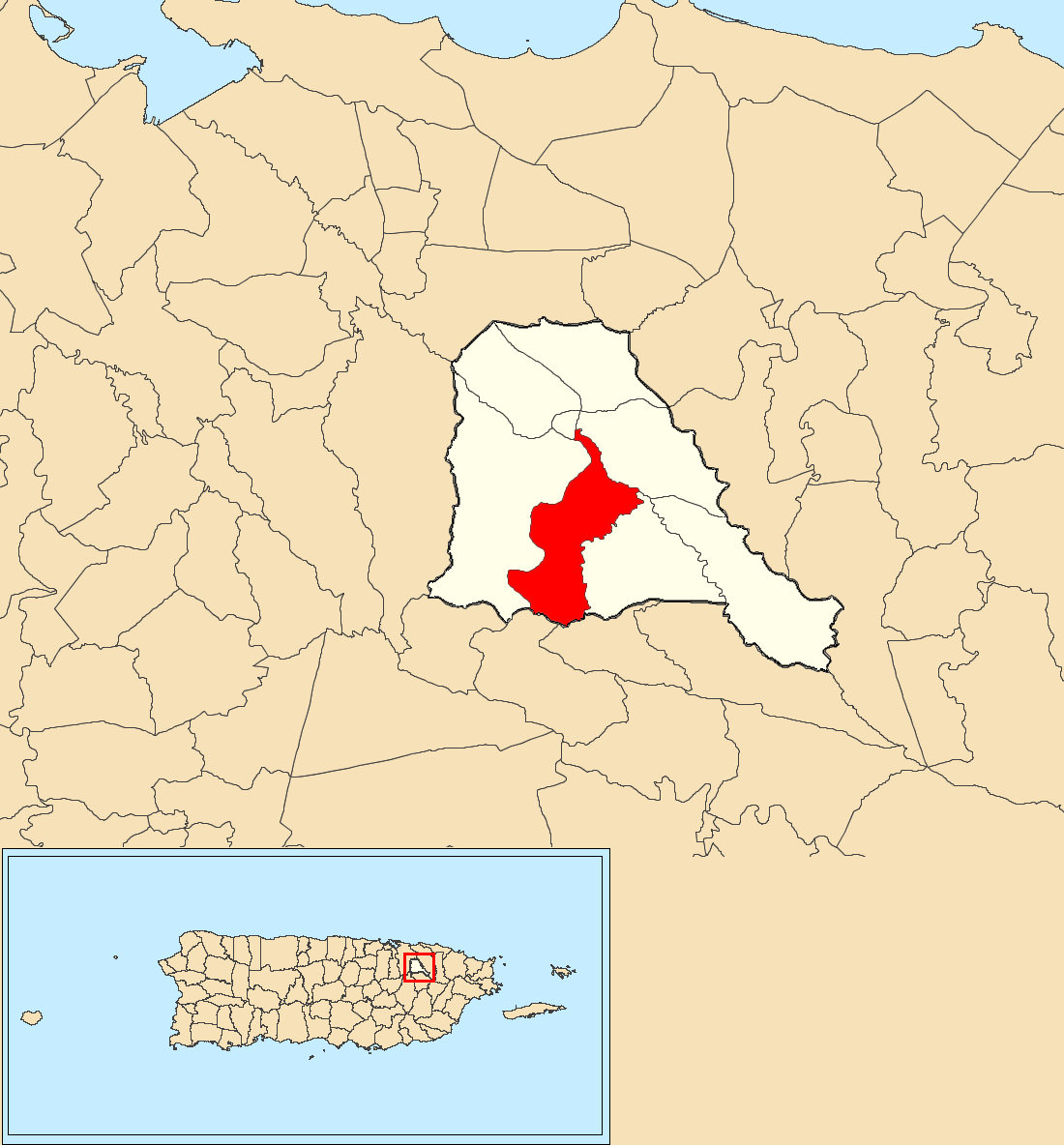
- Location of La Gloria within the municipality of Trujillo Alto shown in red

- Location of Puerto Rico
- Coordinates: 18°19′35″N 66°00′22″W
- Commonwealth: Puerto Rico
- Municipality: Trujillo Alto

Area
  - Total: 2.70 sq mi (7.0 km^{2})
  - Land: 2.52 sq mi (6.5 km^{2})
  - Water: 0.18 sq mi (0.47 km^{2})
- Elevation: 315 ft (96 m)

Population (2010)
  - Total: 4,665
  - Density: 1,858.6/sq mi (717.6/km^{2})
- Source: 2010 Census
- Time zone: UTC−4 (AST)

La Gloria is a barrio in the municipality of Trujillo Alto, Puerto Rico. Its population in 2010 was 4,665.

== History ==
La Gloria was in Spain's gazetteers until Puerto Rico was ceded by Spain in the aftermath of the Spanish–American War under the terms of the Treaty of Paris of 1898 and became an unincorporated territory of the United States. In 1899, the United States Department of War conducted a census of Puerto Rico finding that the combined population of La Gloria barrio and Quebrada Negrito barrio was 1,487.

Historical population
Census	Pop.	Note	%±
1910	1,042		—
1920	1,212		16.3%
1930	1,239		2.2%
1940	1,421		14.7%
1950	1,805		27.0%
1960	2,236		23.9%
1970	0		−100.0%
1980	3,290		—
1990	4,151		26.2%
2000	4,613		11.1%
2010	4,665		1.1%
U.S. Decennial Census; 1900 (N/A) 1910-1930; 1930-1950 1980-2000 2010

== See also ==
- List of communities in Puerto Rico
