= Quebrada Negrito =

Barrio of Trujillo Alto, Puerto Rico

- Barrio
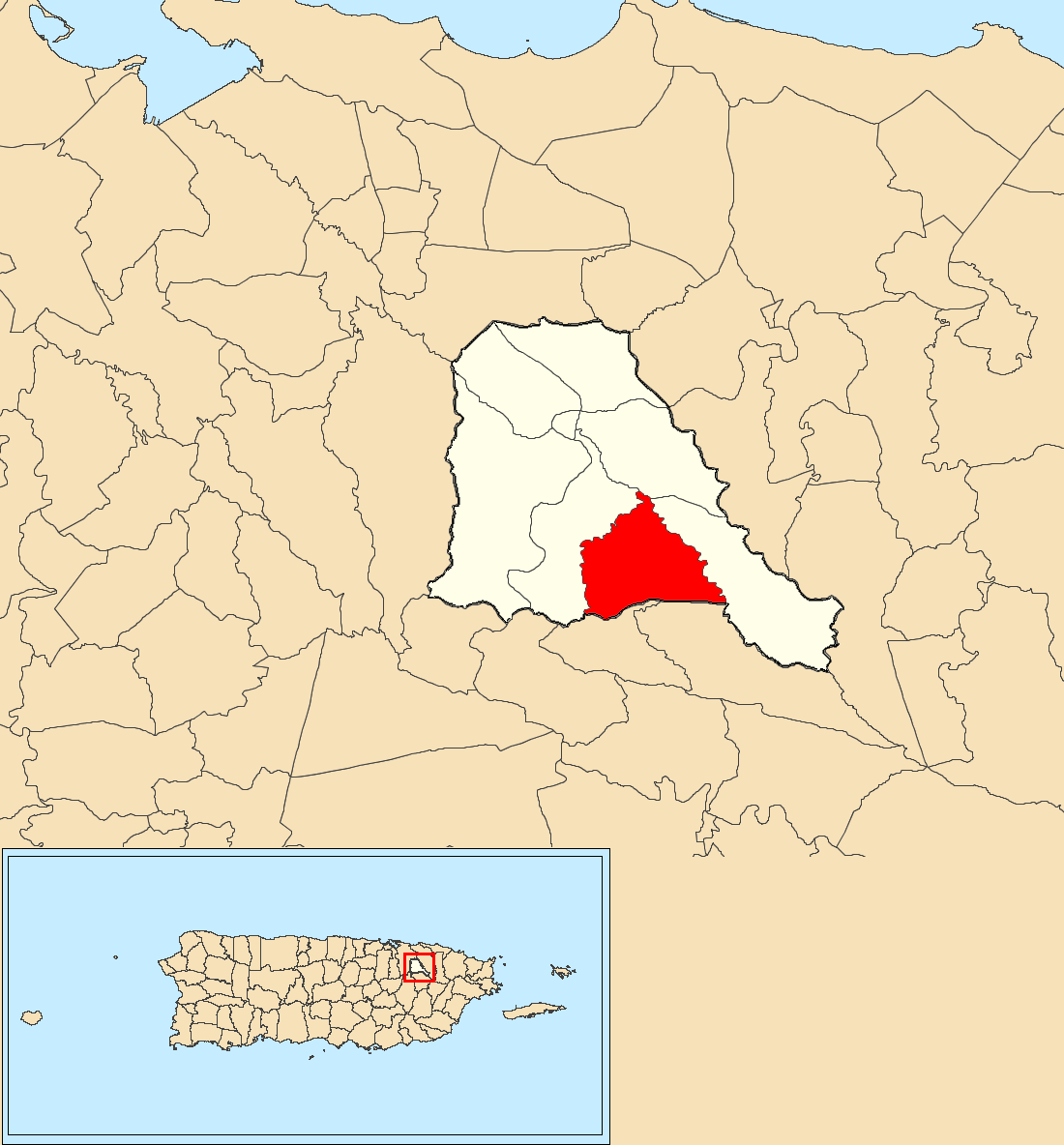
- Location of Quebrada Negrito within the municipality of Trujillo Alto shown in red

- Location of Puerto Rico
- Coordinates: 18°19′10″N 65°59′18″W
- Commonwealth: Puerto Rico
- Municipality: Trujillo Alto

Area
  - Total: 2.73 sq mi (7.1 km^{2})
  - Land: 2.73 sq mi (7.1 km^{2})
  - Water: 0 sq mi (0 km^{2})
- Elevation: 249 ft (76 m)

Population (2010)
  - Total: 5,610
  - Density: 2,054.9/sq mi (793.4/km^{2})
- Source: 2010 Census
- Time zone: UTC−4 (AST)

Quebrada Negrito is a barrio in the municipality of Trujillo Alto, Puerto Rico. Its population in 2010 was 5,610. The barrio was created in 1899.

== History ==
Quebrada Negrito was in Spain's gazetteers until Puerto Rico was ceded by Spain in the aftermath of the Spanish–American War under the terms of the Treaty of Paris of 1898 and became an unincorporated territory of the United States. In 1899, the United States Department of War conducted a census of Puerto Rico finding that the combined population of La Gloria barrio and Quebrada Negrito barrio was 1,487.

Historical population
Census	Pop.	Note	%±
1910	888		—
1920	980		10.4%
1930	1,182		20.6%
1940	1,400		18.4%
1950	1,656		18.3%
1960	1,610		−2.8%
1970	2,353		46.1%
1980	2,644		12.4%
1990	4,690		77.4%
2000	5,835		24.4%
2010	5,610		−3.9%
U.S. Decennial Census; 1900 (N/A) 1910-1930; 1930-1950 1980-2000 2010

== See also ==
- List of communities in Puerto Rico
