= Dos Bocas, Trujillo Alto, Puerto Rico =

Barrio of Puerto Rico

Dos Bocas
- Barrio
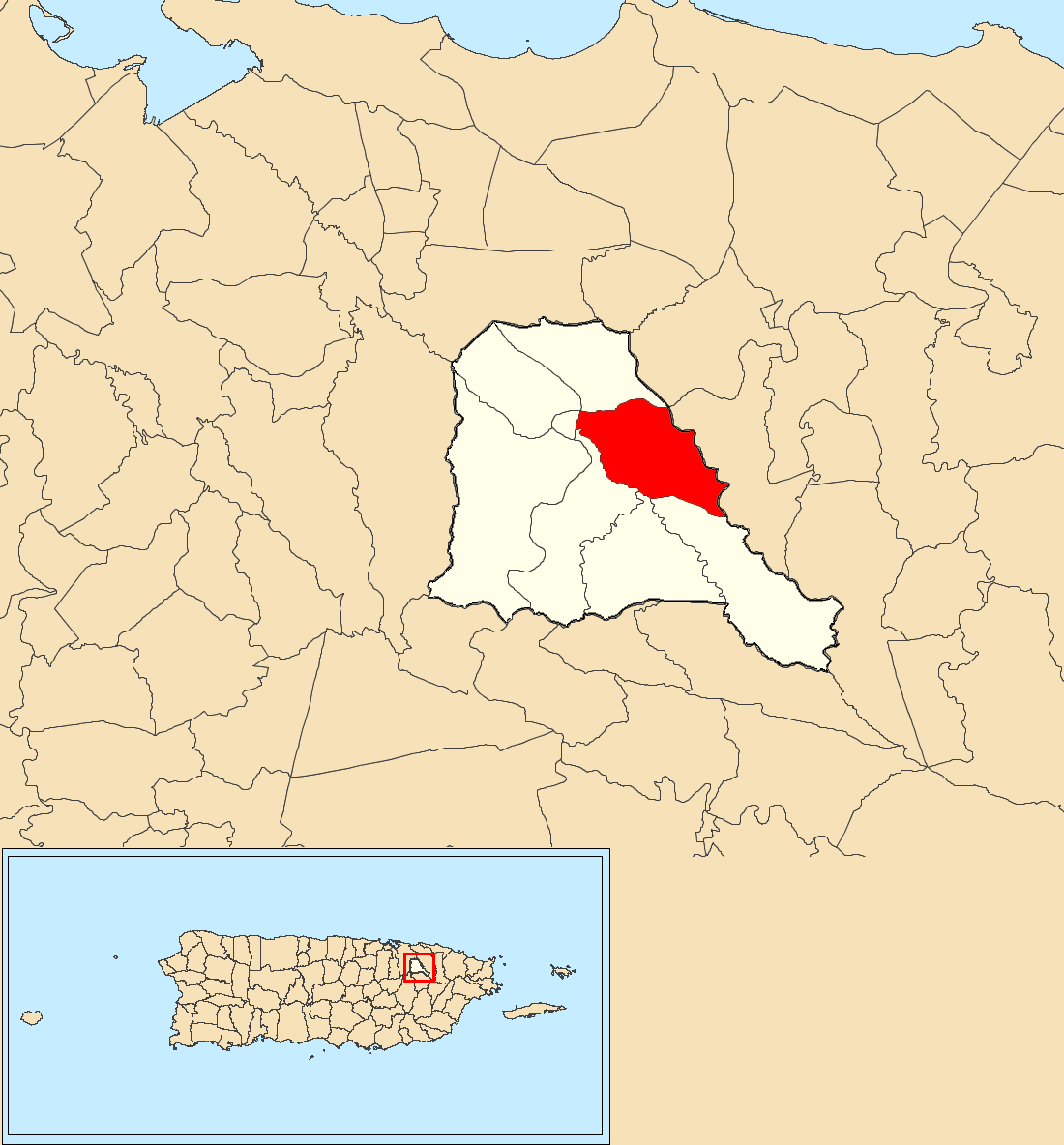
- Location of Dos Bocas within the municipality of Trujillo Alto shown in red

- Location of Puerto Rico
- Coordinates: 18°20′59″N 65°59′00″W
- Commonwealth: Puerto Rico
- Municipality: Trujillo Alto

Area
  - Total: 2.63 sq mi (6.8 km^{2})
  - Land: 2.60 sq mi (6.7 km^{2})
  - Water: 0.03 sq mi (0.078 km^{2})
- Elevation: 236 ft (72 m)

Population (2010)
  - Total: 8,632
  - Density: 3,332.8/sq mi (1,286.8/km^{2})
- Source: 2010 Census
- Time zone: UTC−4 (AST)

Dos Bocas is a barrio in the municipality of Trujillo Alto, Puerto Rico. Its population in 2010 was 8,632.

== History ==
Dos Bocas was in Spain's gazetteers until Puerto Rico was ceded by Spain in the aftermath of the Spanish–American War under the terms of the Treaty of Paris of 1898 and became an unincorporated territory of the United States. In 1899, the United States Department of War conducted a census of Puerto Rico finding that the population of Dos Bocas barrio was 369.

Historical population
Census	Pop.	Note	%±
1900	369		—
1910	624		69.1%
1920	677		8.5%
1930	859		26.9%
1940	1,032		20.1%
1950	676		−34.5%
1960	872		29.0%
1970	0		−100.0%
1980	1,308		—
1990	2,572		96.6%
2000	9,391		265.1%
2010	8,632		−8.1%
U.S. Decennial Census; 1899 (shown as 1900) 1910-1930; 1930-1950 1980-2000 2010

== See also ==
- List of communities in Puerto Rico
