= Quebrada Grande, Trujillo Alto, Puerto Rico =

Barrio of Puerto Rico

Quebrada Grande
- Barrio
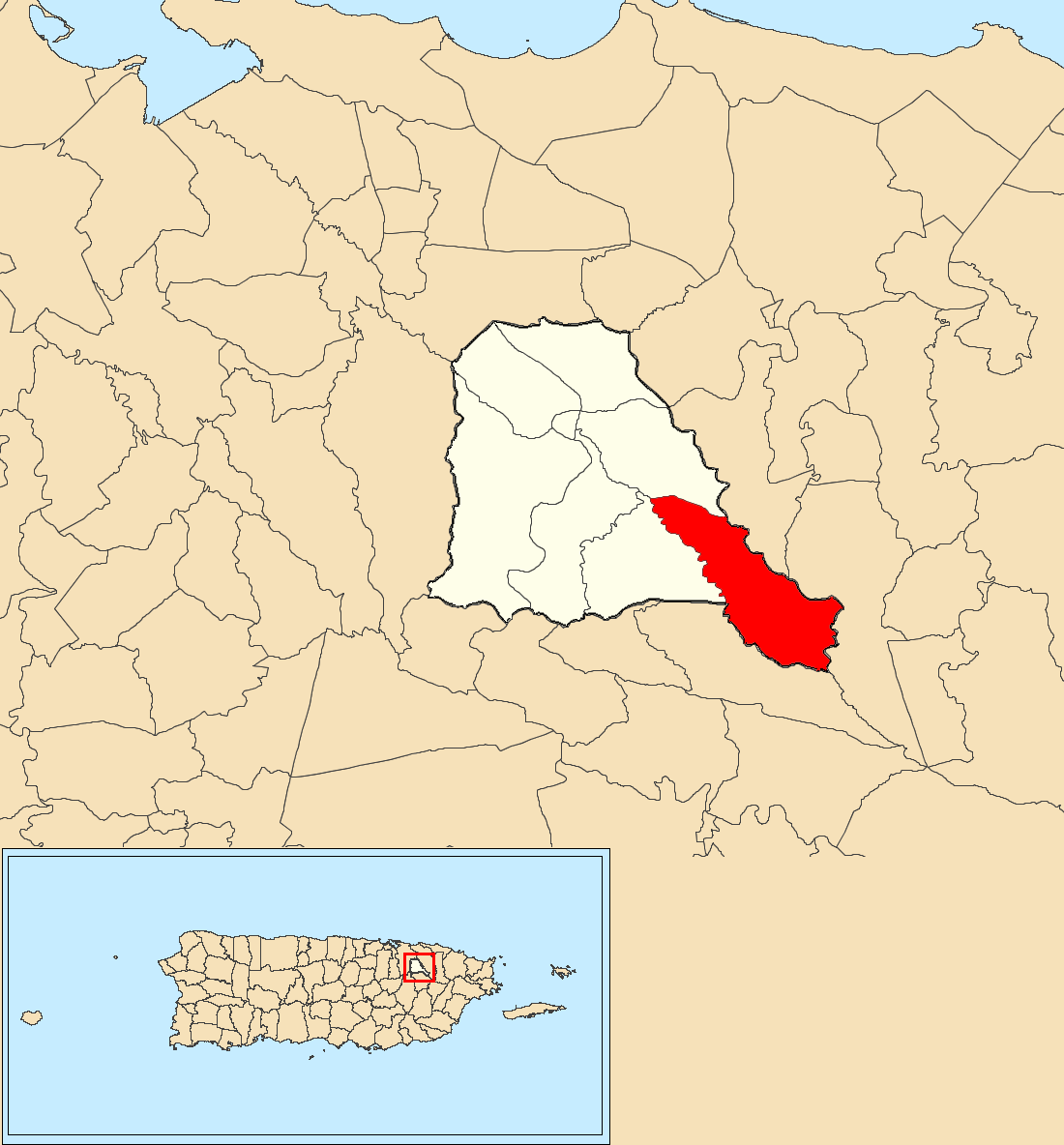
- Location of Quebrada Grande within the municipality of Trujillo Alto shown in red

- Location of Puerto Rico
- Coordinates: 18°18′49″N 65°57′28″W
- Commonwealth: Puerto Rico
- Municipality: Trujillo Alto

Area
  - Total: 3.55 sq mi (9.2 km^{2})
  - Land: 3.55 sq mi (9.2 km^{2})
  - Water: 0 sq mi (0 km^{2})
- Elevation: 384 ft (117 m)

Population (2010)
  - Total: 4,376
  - Density: 1,232.7/sq mi (475.9/km^{2})
- Source: 2010 Census
- Time zone: UTC−4 (AST)

Quebrada Grande is a barrio in the municipality of Trujillo Alto, Puerto Rico. Its population in 2010 was 4,376.

== History ==
Quebrada Grande was in Spain's gazetteers until Puerto Rico was ceded by Spain in the aftermath of the Spanish–American War under the terms of the Treaty of Paris of 1898 and became an unincorporated territory of the United States. In 1899, the United States Department of War conducted a census of Puerto Rico finding that the population of Quebrada Grande barrio was 955.

Historical population
Census	Pop.	Note	%±
1900	955		—
1910	1,052		10.2%
1920	1,259		19.7%
1930	1,399		11.1%
1940	1,372		−1.9%
1950	1,286		−6.3%
1960	1,008		−21.6%
1970	1,406		39.5%
1980	1,722		22.5%
1990	3,416		98.4%
2000	3,957		15.8%
2010	4,376		10.6%
U.S. Decennial Census; 1899 (shown as 1900) 1910-1930; 1930-1950 1980-2000 2010

== See also ==
- List of communities in Puerto Rico
