= Trujillo Alto, Puerto Rico =

Town and municipality in Puerto Rico

Trujillo Alto Municipio Autónomo de Trujillo Alto
- Town and Municipality
- Santa Cruz de Trujillo
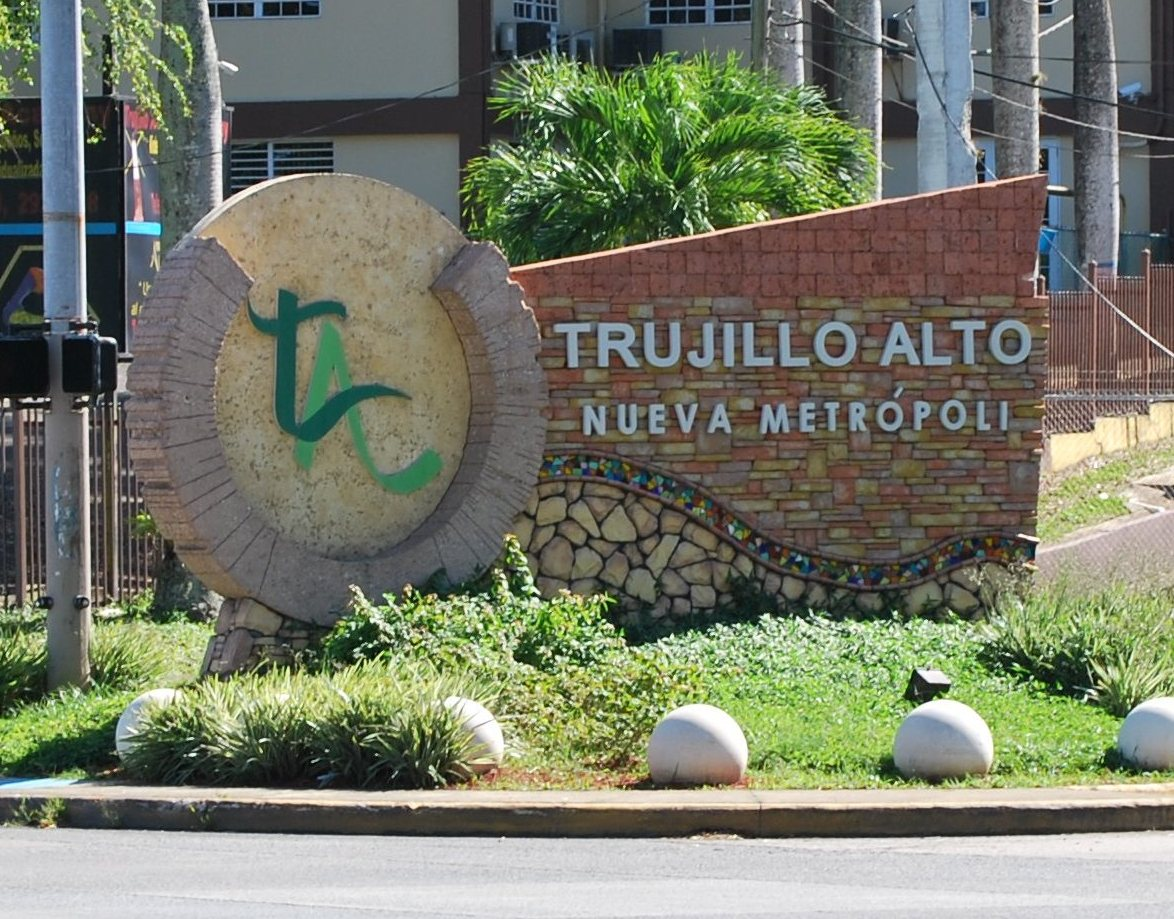
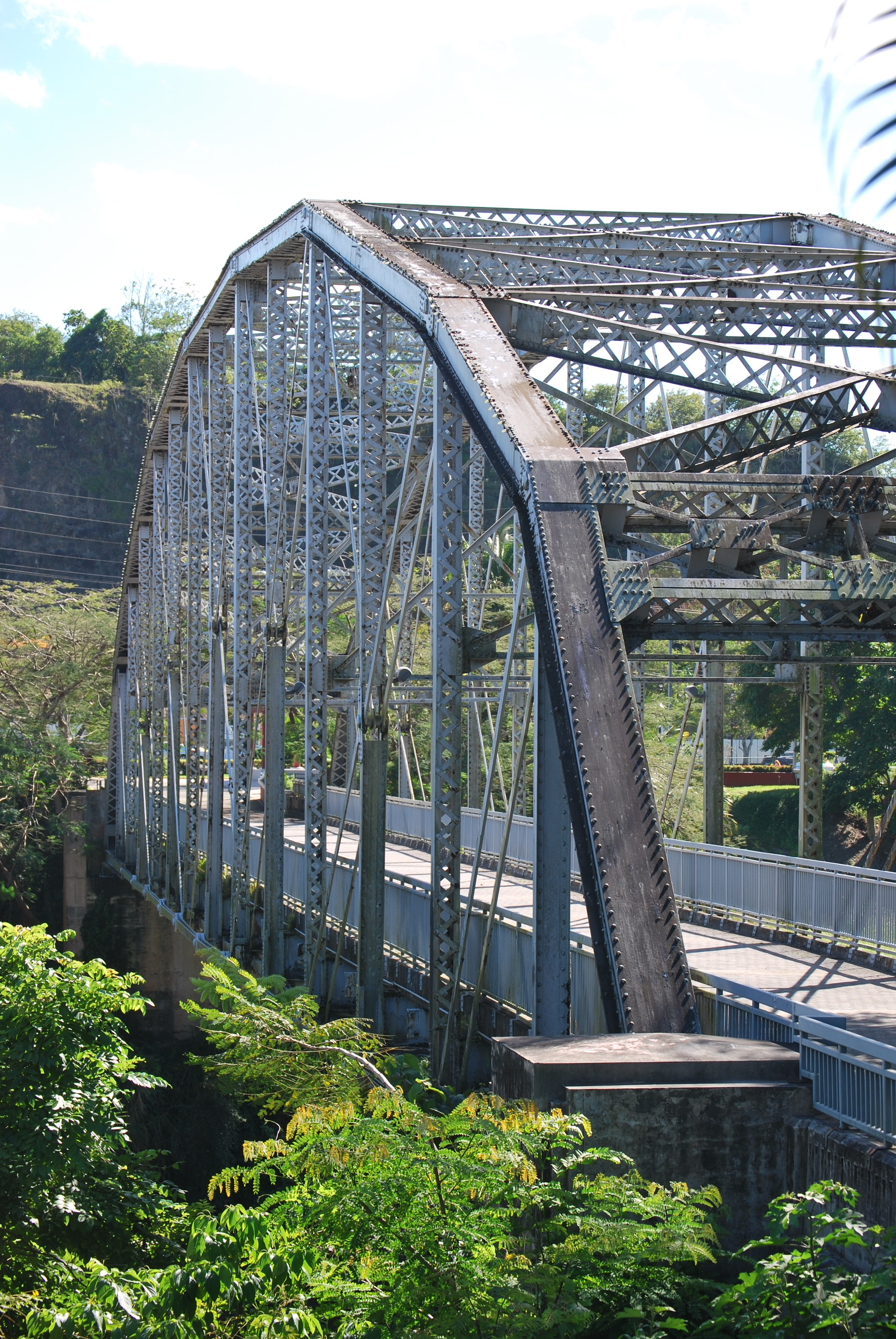
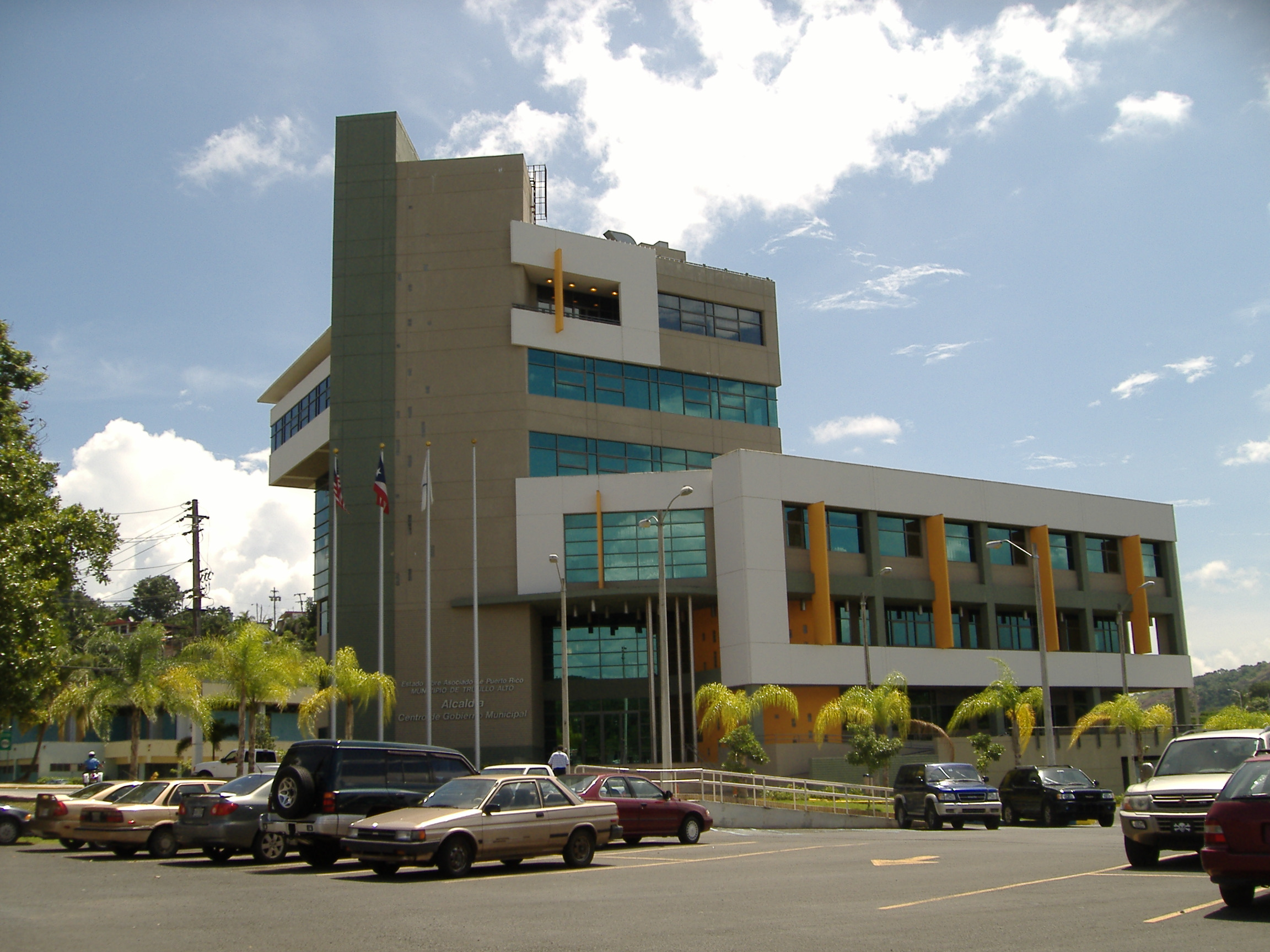
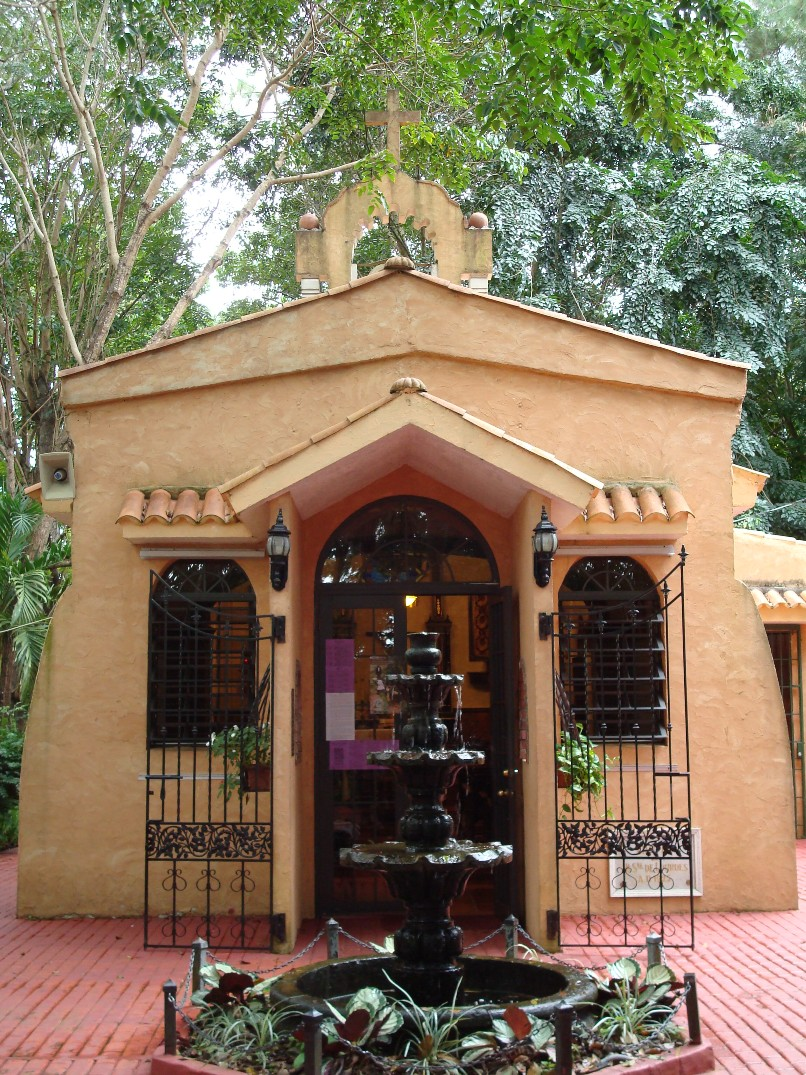
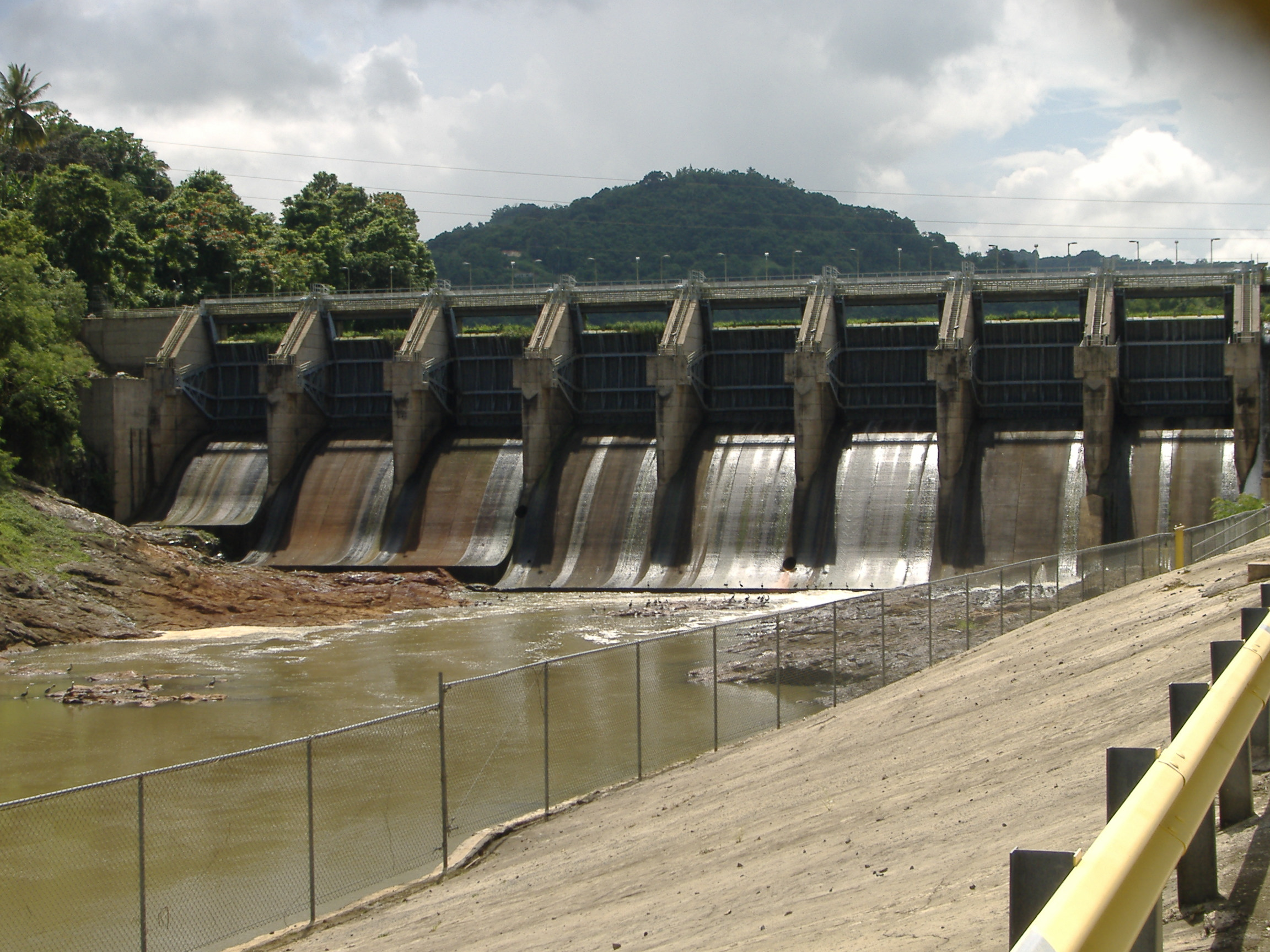
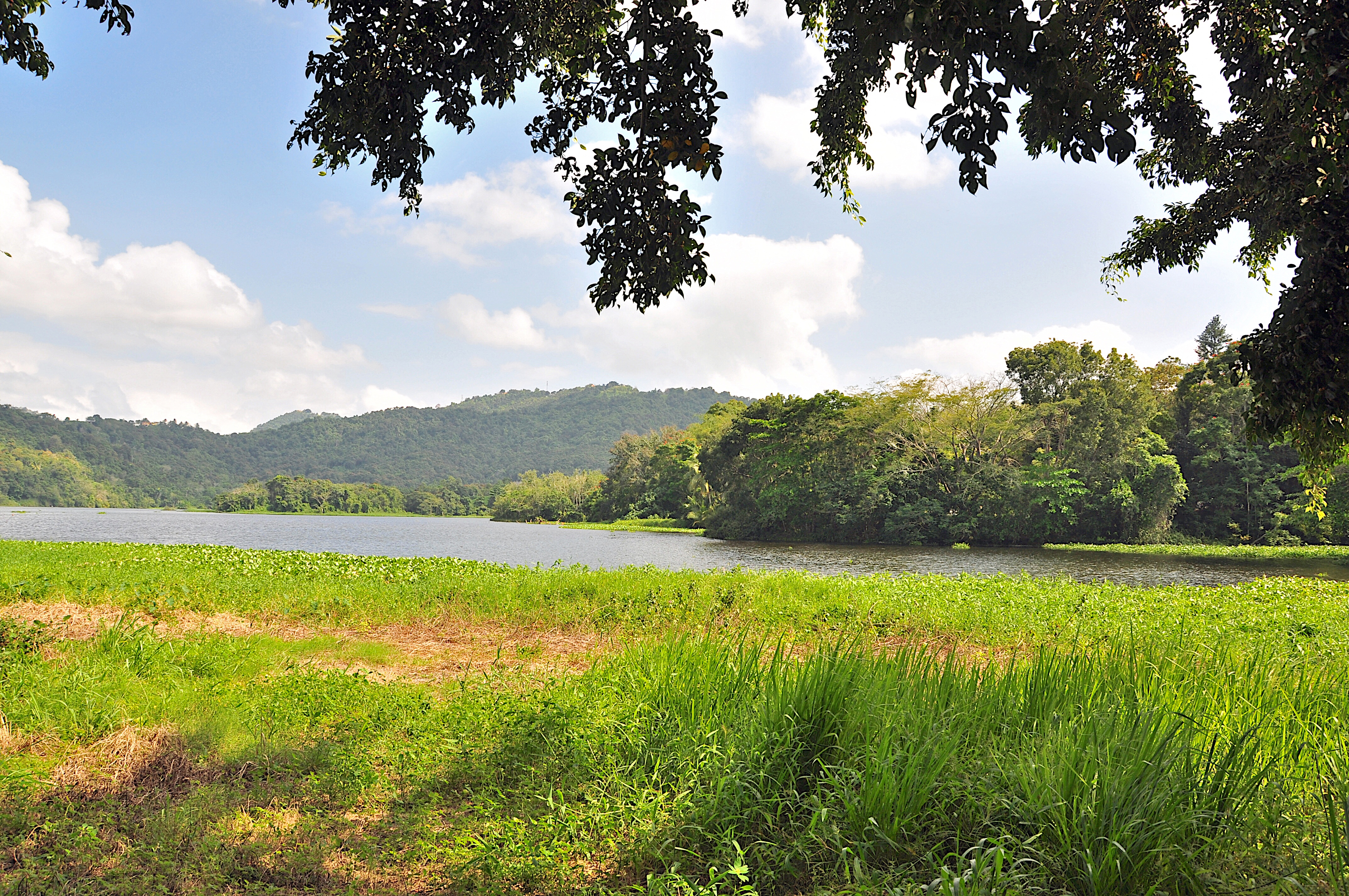
- Trujillo Alto town sign on Trujillo Alto Expressway Trujillo Alto Bridge Trujillo Alto City Hall Lourdes Grotto Carraízo Dam Loíza Lake

- Flag Coat of arms
- Nicknames: Ciudad de los Manantiales, El Pueblo de las Ocho Calles, La Ciudad En El Campo, Los Arrecostaos
- Anthem: Trujillo Alto, Corazón de Pueblo
- Map of Puerto Rico highlighting Trujillo Alto Municipality
- Interactive map of Trujillo Alto
- Coordinates: 18°21′46″N 66°1′3″W
- Sovereign state: United States
- Commonwealth: Puerto Rico
- Founded: January 8, 1801
- Barrios: 8 barrios: Carraízo; Cuevas; Dos Bocas; La Gloria; Quebrada Grande; Quebrada Negrito; St. Just; Trujillo Alto barrio-pueblo

Government
  - Mayor: Pedro Rodríguez Gonzalez (PPD)
  - Senatorial dist.: 8 – Carolina
  - Representative dist.: 40

Area
  - Total: 21.47 sq mi (55.61 km^{2})
  - Land: 21 sq mi (55 km^{2})
  - Water: 0.24 sq mi (.61 km^{2})
- Elevation: 69 ft (21 m)

Population (2020)
  - Total: 75,243
  - Rank: 10th in Puerto Rico
  - Density: 3,500/sq mi (1,400/km^{2})
- Demonym: Trujillanos
- Time zone: UTC−4 (AST)
- ZIP Codes: 00976, 00977, 00978
- Area code: 787/939
- Website: www.trujilloalto.pr

Trujillo Alto (Spanish pronunciation: [tɾuˈxiʝo ˈalto]) is a town and municipality of Puerto Rico. Located on the northeastern coastal plain on the boundary between the Northern Karst Belt and Sierra de Luquillo, it is north of Caguas and Gurabo, southeast of San Juan, and west of Carolina. Its geography features river lowlands and mountains. Part of the San Juan metropolitan area, Trujillo Alto is spread over 6 barrios and the downtown area and administrative center of Trujillo Alto Pueblo.

Trujillo Alto was officially founded in 1801, but gained more importance during the 20th century. Due to its proximity to the capital, San Juan, the city has become a suburb of the metropolitan area, which has sparked its growth during recent years. The population of Trujillo Alto has increased through the last century from 9,576 (1930) to 74,482 (2010). According to the 2010 Census, it is Puerto Rico's tenth-most populated municipality. The urban setting of Trujillo Alto is compact, being divided into the barrios Carraízo, Cuevas, Dos Bocas, La Gloria, Quebrada Grande, Quebrada Negrito, Saint Just and Pueblo.

In 1953–54, the Carraízo hydroelectric dam was constructed in Trujillo Alto by the Sumner Sollitt Construction Company of Chicago, under contract by the Puerto Rico Water Resources Authority. The dam forms the Loíza Lake, a reservoir which serves as the main source of the water supply for San Juan, Puerto Rico.

== History ==
The region of what is now Trujillo Alto belonged to the Taíno region of Cayniabón, which stretched from the northeast coast of Puerto Rico into the central region of the island. The region was led by cacique Canobaná. Archeological findings have identified two sites within the municipality of Trujillo Alto with archeological significance: Las Cuevas, which was studied by Irving Rouse, and Quebrada Grande.

After the Spanish colonization, families started settling at both sides of the Río Grande de Loíza. During the 17th century, the Spanish crown granted Alonso Pizarro Hermona, from Trujillo in Spain, a vast ranch that covered the region. Residents began using his family name to refer to the location. The fertile area was systematically settled due to its adjacent location to the capital of San Juan and its advantage for commerce. Eventually, the inhabitants went to the Governor and asked for a permit to build a chapel, which was a requisite to officially found a town. In 1798, Juan Francisco de Carazo requested formal recognition from the courts. Despite some opposition, Trujillo Alto was founded on January 8, 1801, under the name of Municipio La Santa Cruz de Trujillo. The town was settled on a meander of the Río Grande de Loíza. Around 1820, the name Trujillo Alto was used to differentiate the town from that of Trujillo Bajo (which later became known as Carolina). In 1829, a municipal cemetery was inaugurated.

In 1826, communication to and from the town improved with the construction of two bridges: one into Río Piedras, and the other into Río Grande. The municipality had some economic stability during this period and in 1834, a set of new streets were constructed in the municipality. A decade later, the city hall was opened. In 1844, Trujillo Alto was composed of only five barrios. A few years later, the first school was built. During that time, its population decreased notably due to an epidemic of cholera.

In 1898, when Puerto Rico was ceded by Spain, it became a territory of the United States. In 1899, the US Department of War conducted its first census of Puerto Rico and found that the population of Trujillo Alto was 5,683.

In 1902, the Legislative Assembly of Puerto Rico approved a law for the consolidation of certain municipalities. As a result, Trujillo Alto was incorporated into the town and municipality of bordering Carolina. In 1905 the law was revoked returning Trujillo Alto to its status of municipality again.

In 1952, along with the Carraízo Dam constructed in barrio Carraízo, a filtration plant was constructed in barrio Cuevas in Trujillo Alto.

The proximity of the city to the capital, San Juan, sparked significant growth and development in the region and during the 20th century, the population of Trujillo Alto increased dramatically. As of 2010, the city is the tenth-most populous city of Puerto Rico. Mayor José Luis Cruz Cruz, who has been serving since 2009, has labeled the city as "The New Metropolis".

Hurricane Maria on September 20, 2017, triggered numerous landslides in Trujillo Alto, with its rain and winds. The hurricane winds and rain damaged infrastructure and caused almost the entire electrical system of Trujillo Alto to collapse, leaving its nearly 75,000 residents with no electrical power. Also, 90% of the residents lost access to clean, drinking water.

== Geography ==
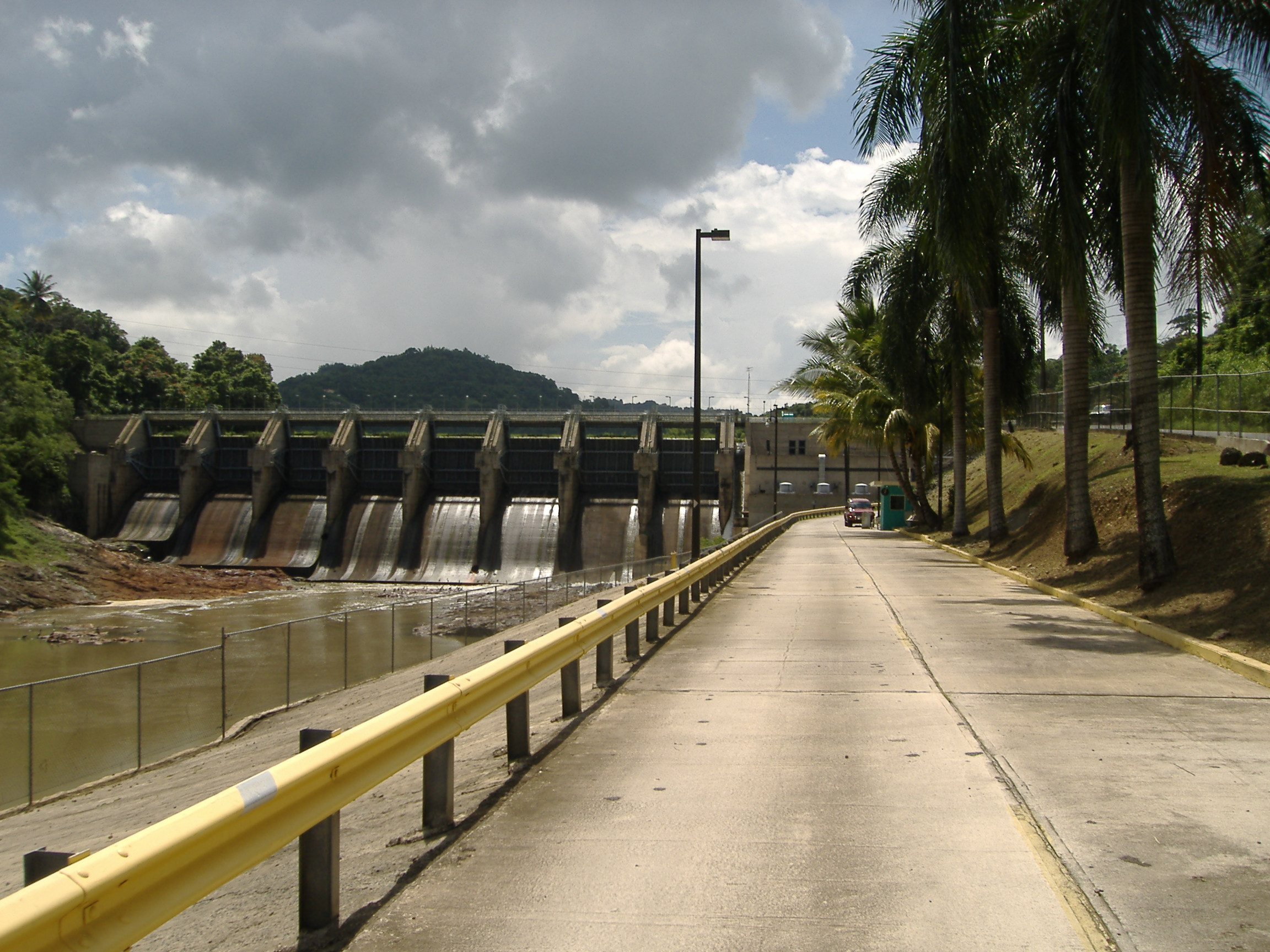
The Carraízo Lake Dam in Trujillo Alto supplies potable water to the San Juan Metropolitan Area.

Trujillo Alto sits on the Northern Coastal Plain region of Puerto Rico. It is bordered by the municipalities of San Juan, Carolina, Gurabo, and Caguas. Trujillo Alto is a small municipality, covering only 21.47 square miles (55.6 km^{2}).

Trujillo Alto's terrain is mostly plain in the north, while the south features small hills. Heights can range from 660 to 1,600 feet (200–500 meters) above sea level.

=== Water features ===
Trujillo Alto's hydrographic system consists mainly of the Río Grande de Loíza, which crosses the municipality. There are also several creeks in the city: Colorada, Infierno, Limones, Naranjo, Grande, Pastrana, Haya Fría, and Maracuto.

Also, Trujillo Alto is the site of Puerto Rico's main water reservoir: The Carraízo Dam, at the Loíza Lake. Both were built in 1953 by the Puerto Rico Aqueducts and Sewers Authority (PRASA). Although it was originally built to generate hydroelectricity, it is now used solely as a public water-supply source. The Loíza Lake is also used for water sports and recreational fishing.

=== Barrios ===
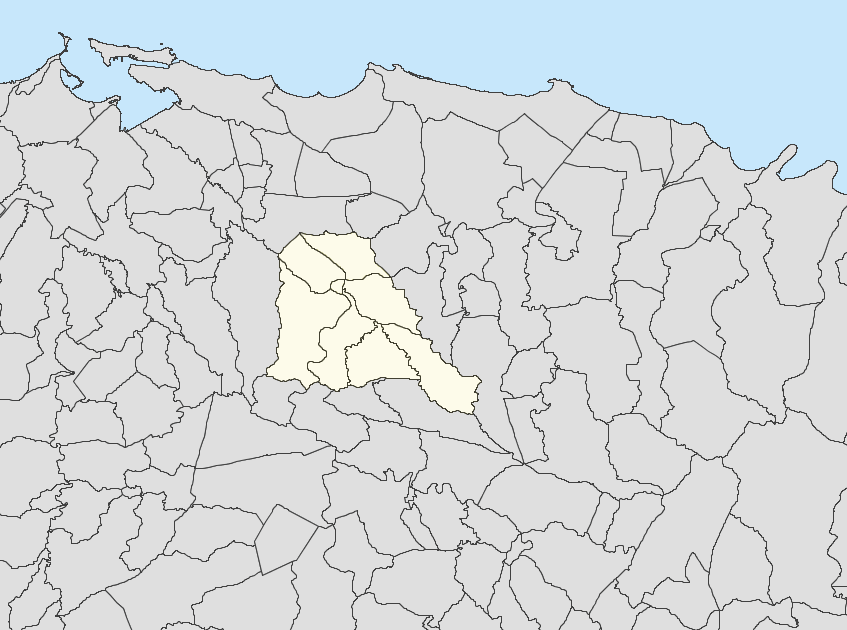
Subdivisions of Trujillo Alto

Like all municipalities of Puerto Rico, Trujillo Alto is subdivided into barrios. The municipal buildings, central square and large Catholic church are located in a barrio referred to as "el pueblo".

1. Carraízo
2. Cuevas
3. Dos Bocas
4. La Gloria
5. Quebrada Grande
6. Quebrada Negrito
7. St. Just
8. Trujillo Alto barrio-pueblo

Trujillo Alto's townscape is fairly simple. Most of the barrios are spread through the rural section of the city, while the downtown area (Trujillo Alto Pueblo) is small, consisting only of eight primary streets. This gave the city the nickname of the "City of the Eight Streets". Also, there are no high-rise buildings and structures.

=== Sectors ===
Barrios (which are, in contemporary times, roughly comparable to minor civil divisions) and subbarrios, are further subdivided into smaller areas called sectores (sectors in English). The types of sectores may vary, from normally sector to urbanización to reparto to barriada to residencial, among others.

=== Special Communities ===
Comunidades Especiales de Puerto Rico (Special Communities of Puerto Rico) are marginalized communities whose citizens are experiencing a certain amount of social exclusion. A map shows these communities occur in nearly every municipality of the commonwealth. Of the 742 places that were on the list in 2014, the following barrios, communities, sectors, or neighborhoods were in Trujillo Alto: San Nicolás neighborhood, Bethania, Comunidad Talanco, El Hoyo II, El Resbalón, Parcelas Carraízo, Parcelas Ramón T. Colón, Sector Arayanes, Sector La Prá, Sector Las Cruces, Sector Los Nuñez, Villa Escondida, Villa Margarita and Villa Platanal.

=== Climate ===
Climate data for Trujillo Alto, Puerto Rico (1991–2020 normals, extremes 1957–present)
Month	Jan	Feb	Mar	Apr	May	Jun	Jul	Aug	Sep	Oct	Nov	Dec	Year
Record high °F (°C)	96 (36)	95 (35)	95 (35)	98 (37)	99 (37)	103 (39)	97 (36)	95 (35)	102 (39)	97 (36)	101 (38)	97 (36)	103 (39)
Mean daily maximum °F (°C)	83.4 (28.6)	84.2 (29.0)	85.0 (29.4)	86.4 (30.2)	87.5 (30.8)	89.1 (31.7)	89.2 (31.8)	89.4 (31.9)	89.8 (32.1)	88.8 (31.6)	86.6 (30.3)	84.1 (28.9)	87.0 (30.6)
Daily mean °F (°C)	75.2 (24.0)	75.4 (24.1)	76.0 (24.4)	77.5 (25.3)	79.2 (26.2)	80.8 (27.1)	81.0 (27.2)	81.2 (27.3)	81.3 (27.4)	80.6 (27.0)	78.6 (25.9)	76.2 (24.6)	78.6 (25.9)
Mean daily minimum °F (°C)	67.0 (19.4)	66.5 (19.2)	66.9 (19.4)	68.6 (20.3)	71.0 (21.7)	72.4 (22.4)	72.8 (22.7)	73.0 (22.8)	72.9 (22.7)	72.4 (22.4)	70.7 (21.5)	68.2 (20.1)	70.2 (21.2)
Record low °F (°C)	55 (13)	55 (13)	52 (11)	52 (11)	54 (12)	62 (17)	61 (16)	61 (16)	60 (16)	56 (13)	57 (14)	53 (12)	52 (11)
Average precipitation inches (mm)	5.02 (128)	3.28 (83)	3.67 (93)	5.92 (150)	6.88 (175)	4.53 (115)	7.11 (181)	7.53 (191)	8.50 (216)	7.60 (193)	7.92 (201)	5.04 (128)	73.00 (1,854)
Average precipitation days (≥ 0.01 in)	16.4	11.3	10.9	11.8	13.7	10.3	15.1	14.9	14.2	15.5	17.6	17.2	168.9
Source: NOAA

== Tourism ==
There are several places of interest for tourists to visit in Trujillo Alto. The Bicentenary Walkway, located in the entrance to the city at the PR-181, features the remodeled historic steel bridge (one of the first permanent crossings of the Grande de Loiza River)reserved for pedestrian use as well as a gazebo. It was built in 2001 to commemorate the 200th anniversary of the founding of Trujillo Alto. The historic Santa Cruz chapel dominates the landscape of the municipal plaza.

Also on the PR-181, is the Luis Muñoz Marín Foundation which was established in 1980. It includes a museum, a historic archive, and a park.

The Carraízo Dam and the Loíza Lake reservoir are also frequently visited. Other places of interest are the Carmelitas de San José Convent, the Lourdes Grotto, and the Trujillo Alto Mountain Spring.

== Economy ==
The economy of Trujillo Alto has relied mostly on agriculture, particularly sugarcane, coffee, tobacco, and minor fruits. Cattle ranching is also a source of economy in Trujillo Alto. In recent years, commerce and industry have become integral parts of the economy of the city. Trujillo Alto is the site of several factories of nutritional products, wood, metal, electrical machinery, and others. There are also stone quarries in town for the production of building materials.

As of 2013, Trujillo Alto's unemployment was 10.2%, making it the second municipality with the lowest rate after Guaynabo.

== Culture ==
=== Festivals and events ===
Trujillo Alto celebrates its patron saint festival in September. The Fiestas Patronales de Santa Cruz is a religious and cultural celebration that generally features parades, games, artisans, amusement rides, regional food, and live entertainment.

The Festival Trujillano de Orquídeas (Orchid Festival) has been held in July since 2011. It is an horticultural competition and festival where orchids are ranked, exhibited and sold.

The Festival del Macabeo (Macabeo Festival), a festival celebrating a food specific to Trujillo Alto, is celebrated each year around the second week of December.

Other festivals and fairs celebrated in Trujillo Alto include an agricultural fair held in January and a Paso Fino Festival held in November.

In 2001, Trujillo Alto commemorated its bicentenary with the opening of a new park in the PR-181, which included a remodeling of the historical steel bridge.

=== Religion ===
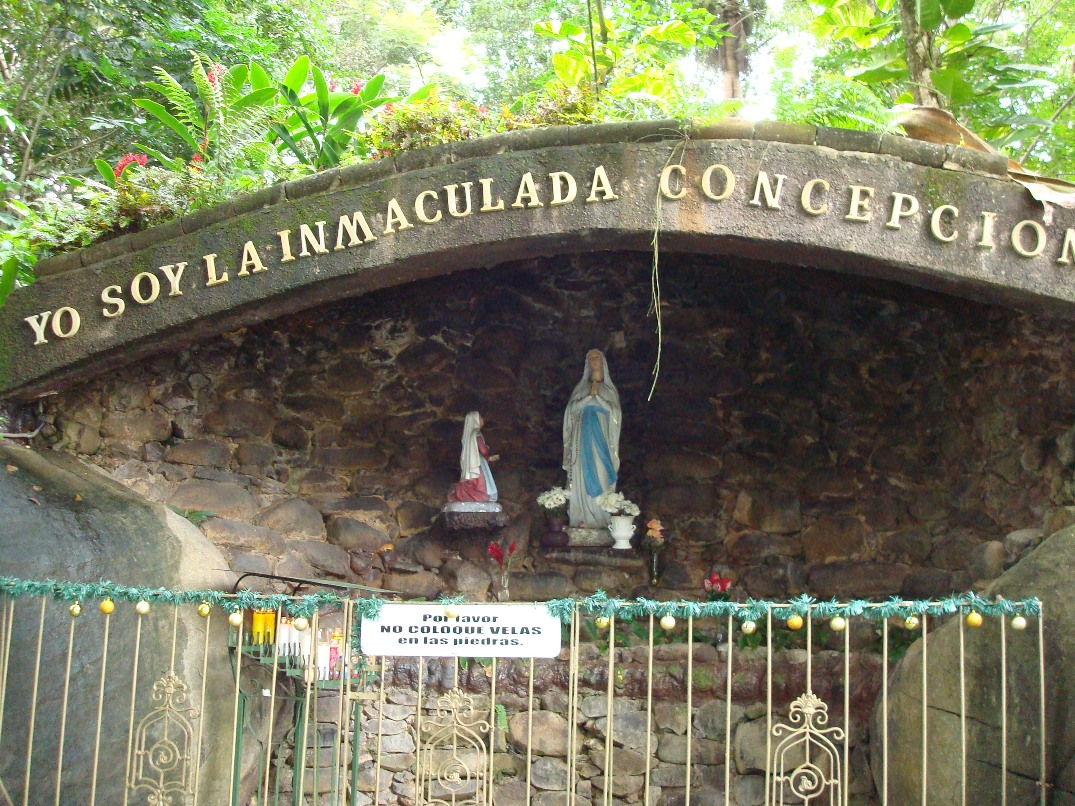
Our Lady of Lourdes grotto

There are a number of churches and chapels from several denominations in Trujillo Alto. The main parish, Santa Cruz Church, was built in 1817. Part of a related structure was damaged by Hurricane San Felipe in 1928. The current structure was designed by Luis Perocier and built in 1933.

Trujillo Alto has also been a place of pilgrimage for Catholics after a shrine to Our Lady of Lourdes was blessed in 1925. The site also features a grotto dedicated to Our Lady of Lourdes which is a congregation site during Holy Week. The Gruta de Lourdes (Lourdes Grotto) is visited frequently by religious people and tourists. There's also a convent in Trujillo Alto called the Convento Carmelitas de San José.

=== Sports ===
Trujillo Alto doesn't have a professional sports team. However, there are several sports facilities in the city for amateur and novice leagues. In 2011, the Rubén Sánchez Montañez Court in Trujillo Alto, hosted the Cangrejeros de Santurce team of the Baloncesto Superior Nacional (BSN), which is the professional basketball league. The facility has a capacity for 2,250 people.

In September, Trujillo Alto celebrates the Arrecosta'o Marathon, which is one of the most important events in the city. The race has been celebrated yearly since 1985. It originally covered a 6.2-mile (10-kilometer) trajectory around town, but in 2007, it was shortened to 3.1 miles (5 kilometers). In 2010, the marathon was recognized as one of the best organized events of the year.

The Loíza Lake is also a frequent spot for sports and recreational fishing. The lake features a wide variety of fishes like: largemouth bass, peacock bass, sea chubs, tilapia, and beardfish.

=== Cuisine ===
The macabeo is the most known typical food of Trujillo Alto. It is a fried dish made with plantains and meat. The popularity of the dish is such that a festival is celebrated annually on its honor. The Macabeo Festival began in the early 1980s and is held annually in December.

== Demographics ==
Historical population
Census	Pop.	Note	%±
1900	5,683		—
1910	6,345		11.6%
1920	7,470		17.7%
1930	9,576		28.2%
1940	11,726		22.5%
1950	13,605		16.0%
1960	18,251		34.1%
1970	30,669		68.0%
1980	51,389		67.6%
1990	61,120		18.9%
2000	75,728		23.9%
2010	74,842		−1.2%
2020	67,740		−9.5%
U.S. Decennial Census; 1899 (shown as 1900) 1910–1930; 1930–1950 1960–2000 2010 2020

The population of Trujillo Alto increased steadily during the 20th century and until the year 2000. There was a 1.2% decrease from 2000 to 2010 and a 9.5% decrease from 2010 to 2020. According to the 2020 census, the municipality had 67,740 inhabitants. Despite the decline, in 2020 Trujillo Alto was the tenth largest municipality in Puerto Rico, in terms of population.

According to the 2010 Census, 72% of the population identifies themselves as White, and 14.6% as African-American. Also, 47.5% of the population identified themselves as males, and 52.5% as females. Finally, 25% of the population is under 18 years old. The next biggest percentage of population (20.7%) is between 35 and 49 years old.

== Government ==
Like all municipalities in Puerto Rico, Trujillo Alto is administered by a mayor. The first official mayor of Trujillo Alto was Juan Francisco Carazo, who was one of the residents that vouched for the founding of the town in 1801. The mayor as of July 16, 2022 is Pedro Rodríguez González. Before him was José Luis Cruz Cruz (from the Popular Democratic Party), who was elected in the 2004 general election.

The city belongs to the Puerto Rico Senatorial district VIII, which is represented by two Senators. In 2024, Marissa Jiménez and Héctor Joaquín Sánchez Álvarez were elected as District Senators. Representatives Wanda Del Valle Correa (District 38) and Roberto Rivera Ruiz (District 39), both from the PPD, represent different regions of Trujillo Alto in the House of Representatives.

== Symbols ==
The municipio has an official flag and coat of arms.

=== Flag ===
The flag of Trujillo Alto features a white background with the town's coat of arms in the center. The original flag depicted the shield in a white square. On May29, 1998, the municipal administration of Brunilda Soto Echevarria changed the design to only feature the central part of the shield on the white square, which remains the current depiction.

=== Coat of arms ===
The coat of arms features a shield with a blue border, with eight spurts of water representing the many springs, creeks, and rivers that flow in town. Inside the shield, there's a silver field with three green mountains and a blue Latin cross above them. The flag features a white banner below the shield with the name of the city, and a coronet in the form of a five-tower mural crown alluding to the Spanish crown. The banner and the coronet aren't featured in the flag.

=== Nicknames ===
Trujillo Alto is known by various names. It is known as the "City of Springs" for its many rivers and creeks. It is also known as the "Town of the Eight Streets" because the downtown area consists of eight streets. Trujillo Alto is also known as the "City in the Country", for its proximity to the San Juan Metropolitan Area despite being mostly a mountain town. Finally, it is also called the "Laid-back Town".

== Transportation ==
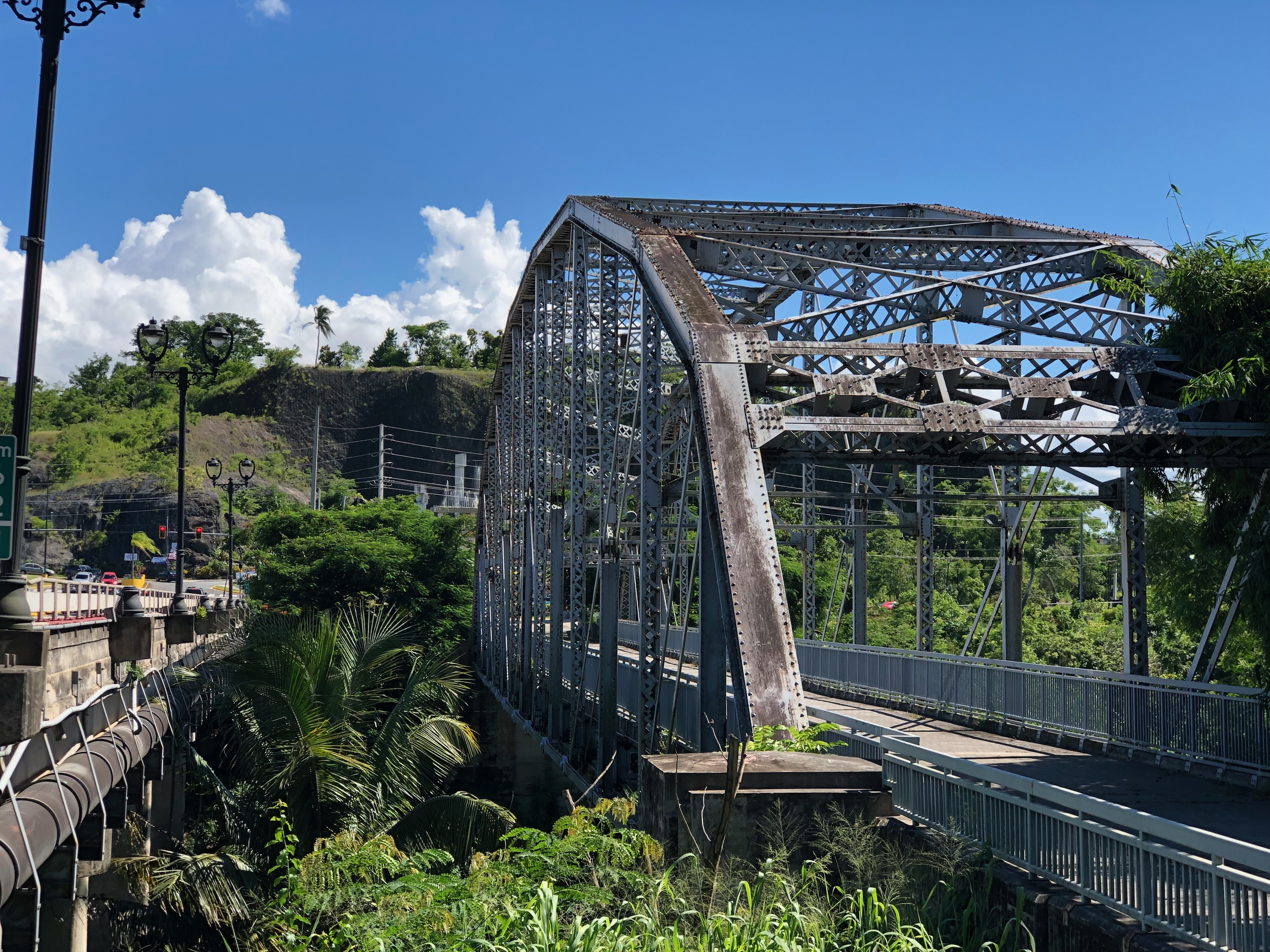
Historic steel bridge in Trujillo Alto on the PR-181

The main road to Trujillo Alto is the PR-181 that crosses the municipality from north to south. Distance from the capital is 11 miles (18 km), with a travel time of roughly 15 minutes by car. Other highways that lead to Trujillo Alto are PR-852 of the Quebrada Grande neighborhood and Dos Bocas, PR-175 of the neighborhood Carraízo, the Las Cumbres Avenue and PR-851 from La Gloria neighborhood.

In the past, communication with the town was limited because of its location on the other side of the Río Grande de Loíza. The construction of two bridges in 1826 helped facilitate access to the town. In 1939, the United States Army built a steel bridge in the entrance to the town on the PR-181, to replace one of the older ones. Although the bridge is no longer used for vehicles, it has become a symbol of the city and still stands today.

The northern part of Trujillo Alto is serviced by the Puerto Rico Metropolitan Bus Authority, with various stops along the PR-181 and nearby neighborhoods. Other public transportation in the city is provided by taxis and independent public cars.

There are 11 bridges in Trujillo Alto.

== Notable natives and residents ==
- Dariam Acevedo – 1984 Olympic gold medalist representing Puerto Rico in female beach volleyball
- Jasmine Camacho-Quinn – 2020 Olympic gold medalist representing Puerto Rico in Women's 100m Hurdles, was able to represent Puerto Rico because her family, namely her mother, is from Trujillo Alto.
- Tulio Larrínaga – Architect of the city of San Juan in 1872.
- Yolandita Monge – International singer, songwriter, actress, and television personality.
- Irad Ortiz Jr – Champion jockey and winner of over 3000 races in the USA. Also three-time consecutive winner (2018,2019,2020) of the Eclipse Award for outstanding jockey of the year.
- Jose Ortiz – Champion jockey and winner of over 2300 races in the USA. 2017 winner of the Eclipse Award for outstanding jockey of the year.
- Manuel Rivera Morales, sports commentator.
- Medardo Carazo, educator.
- Tulio Larrinaga, politician and builder of the first railroad.
- José Figueroa Adorno, artist.

== Gallery ==
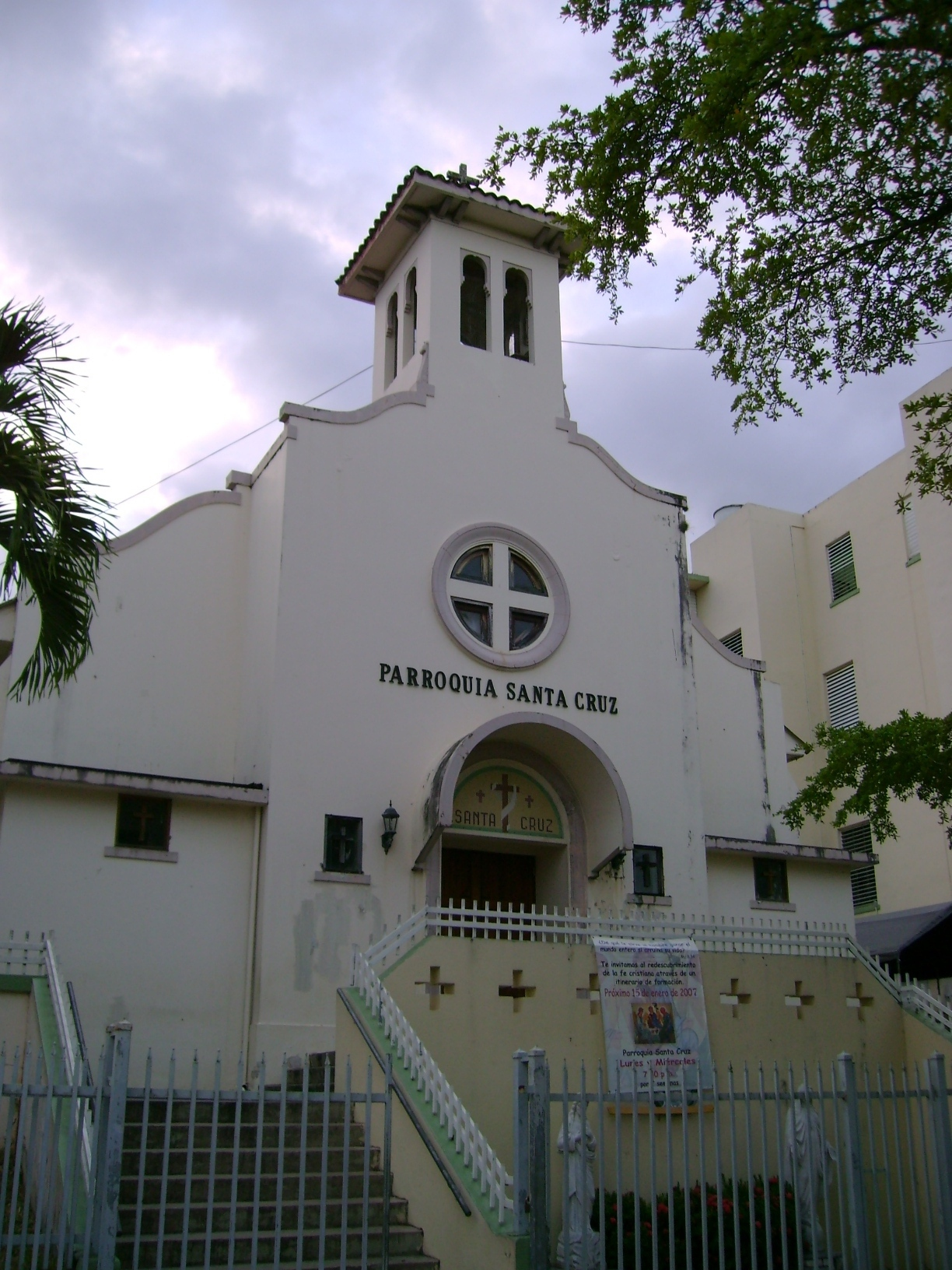
Parroquia Santa Cruz in Trujillo Alto Pueblo, 2007

== See also ==
- List of Puerto Ricans
- History of Puerto Rico
- Did you know-Puerto Rico?
