= Idol Puerto Rico =

Television series

- Idol Puerto Rico title card (2011–2013)
- Created by: Simon Fuller
- Presented by: Jaime Augusto Mayol
- Judges: Topy Mamery; Ricardo Montaner (2011–2012); Yolandita Monge (2012); Erika Ender (2011); Jerry Rivera (2011); Milly Quezada (2013); Noel Schajris (2013); Elvis Crespo (2013)
- Theme music composer: Julian Gingell; Barry Stone; Cathy Dennis
- Country of origin: Puerto Rico
- Original language: Spanish
- No. of seasons: 3

Production
- Executive producers: Paola Portilla; Luciano Cardinali; Jimmy Arteaga
- Production locations: Centro de Bellas Artes; Caguas, Puerto Rico
- Running time: Two hours
- Production companies: FremantleMedia; 19 Entertainment; WAPA-TV

Original release
- Network: WAPA-TV
- Release: August 7, 2011 – 2013

Idol Puerto Rico is a reality television competition to find new solo singing talent. Part of the Idol franchise, it is based on the British show Pop Idol created by Simon Fuller. The first season of the show debut on August 7, 2011 on WAPA-TV.

== History ==
Idol Puerto Rico logo as of 2011

Idol Puerto Rico is the Puerto Rico edition of the British show Pop Idol. Like its international counterparts, the show employs a panel of judges to select singers in audition, then adding other elements such as telephone voting by the viewing public and the drama of backstories and real-life soap opera unfolding in real time. The show debuted in 2011 in Puerto Rico with Paola Portilla, Luciano Cardinali, and Jimmy Arteaga as producers. In 2012, the show was renewed for a second season which debuted on July 29, 2012.

== Judges and hosts ==
The first season of Idol Puerto Rico featured four judges: producer Topy Mamery, singer Ricardo Montaner, singer/producer Erika Ender, and singer Jerry Rivera. For the second season, Ender and Rivera were replaced by Mamery's wife, singer Yolandita Monge. Guest judges may occasionally be introduced.

Both seasons have been hosted by model and presenter Jaime Augusto Mayol.

=== Summary ===
Seasons	Years	Winner	Judges	Host(s)
1	2011	Christian Pagán	Topy Mamery; Ricardo Montaner; Erika Ender; Jerry Rivera	Jaime Augusto Mayol
2	2012	Gremal Maldonado	Topy Mamery; Ricardo Montaner; Yolandita Monge	Jaime Augusto Mayol
3	2013	Marileyda Hernández	Topy Mamery; Milly Quezada; Noel Schajris; Elvis Crespo	Jaime Augusto Mayol

Judges profiles

- Ricardo Montaner (Season 1–2): Venezuelan-Argentine singer and songwriter. Starting his career in the late 70s, he has already released more than 15 albums with numerous successful singles and has sold over 22 million record worldwide.
- Carlos "Topy" Mamery (Season 1–3): Veteran Puerto Rican producer and manager. He is the son of broadcaster Gilbert Mamery. He began his career in the media at the age of 15, as broadcaster and producer of a radio program called Metamorfosis. He has worked for 25 years as manager of local and international artists like Ricardo Montaner, Jerry Rivera, Yolandita Monge and actors like Jorge Abello. He has also produced concerts for artists like Ricardo Arjona and Mecano. For five years he was the manager of Spanish Broadcasting System of Puerto Rico (SBS).
- Yolandita Monge (Season 2): is an international Puerto Rican singer and actress. She is the first Puerto Rican female singer to be nominated to a Grammy, and is also Puerto Rico's highest selling female artist. Starting her career as a teenager, Monge has recorded over thirty albums.
- Erika Ender (Season 1): Born in Panama to a Brazilian mother and a Panamanian-American father. Erika is a singer, composer, dancer and producer.
- Jerry Rivera (Season 1): Puerto Rican salsa singer. He began his career as a teenager and became known as "El Bebé de la Salsa". Rivera has been nominated to both the Grammy and Latin Grammy Awards.

== Selection process ==
=== Contestant eligibility ===
The eligible age-range for contestants is currently sixteen to twenty-eight years old. The contestants must be legal U.S. residents, and present the completed required form with a proper identification. Minors should be accompanied by their parents or legal guardians.

=== Initial auditions ===
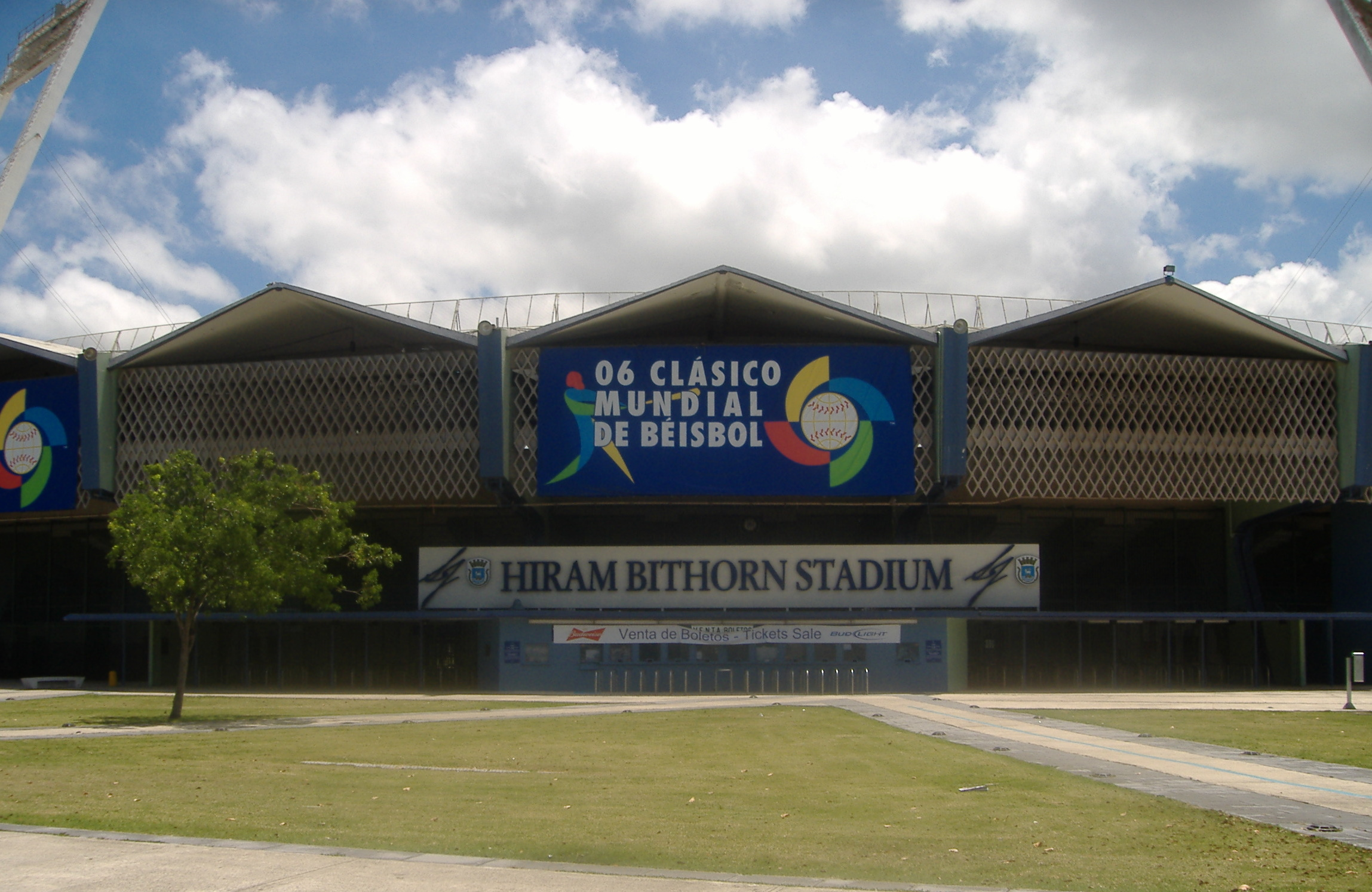
Hiram Bithorn Stadium

Auditions are usually held on two locations: Hiram Bithorn Stadium in San Juan, and Auditorio Juan Pachín Vicéns in Ponce. During the auditions, contestants will perform in front of the judges and/or producers. They will then choose a total of 80 contestants to advance to the "Theater Level" auditions.

=== Audience voting ===
From the semifinal onwards, contestants are "saved" by public vote. During the contestant's performance as well as the recap at the end, a toll-free telephone number for each contestant is displayed on the screen. For a period of time after the episode ends, viewers may call or send a text message to their preferred contestant's telephone number, and each call or text message is registered as a vote for that contestant. The contestants with the fewest votes may be eliminated in successive weeks until a winner emerges. Voting via text messaging is also possible through AT&T, as well as online voting.

=== Rewards for winner and finalists ===
The winner receives a record deal with Universal Music Group and secures a management contract for his musical career. The winner might also receive additional prizes like a new automobile, mobile phones, tablet PCs, cash, scholarships, and other endorsement deals.

== Seasons ==
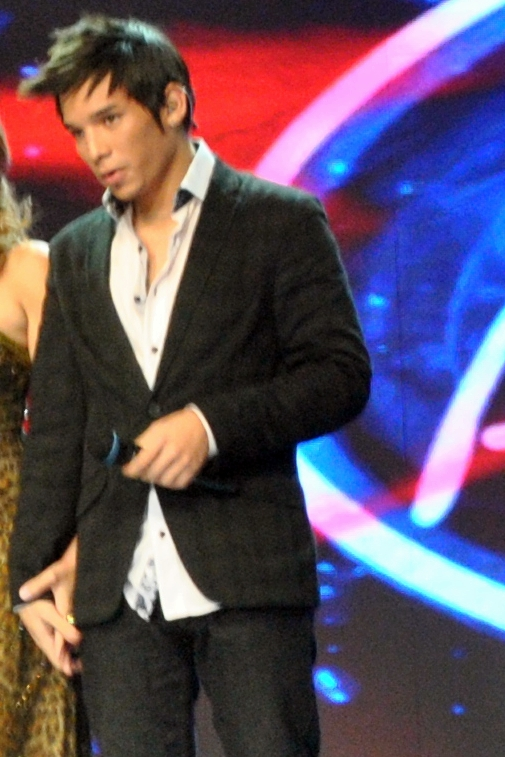
Christian Pagán, winner of season 1

=== Season 1 ===
The first season of Idol Puerto Rico debuted on August 7, 2011 on WAPA-TV. It was hosted by Jaime Augusto Mayol. After the initial auditions, 24 contestants were selected. These were cut to 12 during the semi-finals. The final showdown was between Christian Pagán and Japhet Albert. Pagán won the first place on November 21, 2012. Pagán has already released two albums, with the first one peaking at #1 on Billboard Latin Charts.

=== Season 2 ===
The second season of Idol Puerto Rico debuted on July 29, 2012. Hosted by Mayol again, it featured singer Yolandita Monge as a new judge, replacing Erika Ender and Jerry Rivera. Like the first season, 24 contestants were selected after the initial auditions. Of these, 12 were eliminated during the semi-finals, with the remaining 12 heading for the finals. The finale aired on November 12, 2012 on WAPA-TV. The winner was Gremal Maldonado Its origin is Dominican-Puerto Rican ., who has already released her first studio album.

== Idol Kids Puerto Rico ==
Idol Puerto Rico
- Idol Kids Puerto Rico title card (2012–13)
- Also known as: Idol Kids Puerto Rico
- Created by: Simon Fuller
- Presented by: Carlos Ponce (2012); Karla Monroig (2013)
- Judges: Erika Ender (2012); Edgardo Diaz (2012–13); Florentino Primera (2012); Servando Primera (2012); Ana Isabelle (2013); Kany Garcia (2013)
- Theme music composer: Julian Gingell; Barry Stone; Cathy Dennis
- Country of origin: Puerto Rico
- Original language: Spanish
- No. of seasons: 2

Production
- Executive producers: Paola Portilla; Luciano Cardinali; Jimmy Arteaga
- Production location: Centro de Bellas Artes
- Running time: 120 mins
- Production companies: FremantleMedia; 19 Entertainment; WAPA-TV

Original release
- Network: WAPA-TV
- Release: August 2012 – 2013

Idol Kids Puerto Rico logo

Idol Kids Puerto Rico is a reality television competition to find new solo singing talent between 6 and 12 years old. Part of the Idol franchise, it is based on the British show Pop Idol created by Simon Fuller. The first season of the show debut in August 2012 on WAPA-TV at the same time with the second season of Idol Puerto Rico.

Idol Kids Puerto Rico has a similar format to Idol Puerto Rico, as the gala is broadcast live through the Centro de Bellas Artes de Caguas and the public takes charge of the election winner. The main difference between products is that participants do not coexist in the same home because they are minors, so they are with their parents during the competition. The child who wins the competition will receive a scholarship of $15,000 and $5,000 in cash, among other prizes.

== Seasons ==
Season 1 aired from August to November 2012 and was won by Edgard Hernández, 12 years old back then. The age of the finalists was from 8 to 12. The runner-up, Alexey, was 9 years old.

=== Summary ===
Seasons	Years	Winner	Judges	Host(s)
1	2012	Edgard Hernández	Erika Ender; Edgardo Diaz; Florentino Primera; Servando Primera	Carlos Ponce
2	2013	Christopher Rivera	Edgardo Diaz; Kany Garcia; Ana Isabelle	Karla Monroig

== Critical reception ==
During both its seasons, Idol Puerto Rico has earned the best ratings among local television.
