= Jaime Augusto Mayol =

Puerto Rican model and TV presenter, Manhunt International 2006 winner

Jaime Augusto Mayol (born February 5, 1980, in San Juan, Puerto Rico) is a Puerto Rican TV host, model and beauty pageant titleholder. Mayol is known for being the winner of the 2006 Manhunt International pageant representing the United States, and for being the host of Pégate al Mediodía and Idol Puerto Rico.

== Early years and education ==
Mayol was born on February 5, 1980, in San Juan, Puerto Rico. He is 6 ft 2 in (1.88 m) tall. When he was 18 years old, he moved to Utah to attend college, thanks to an athletic scholarship to be a member of the Brigham Young University (BYU) volleyball team. Mayol eventually earned a degree in International Business and worked as a sales and marketing executive in a public relations agency. He is also a former professional volleyball player.

== Modeling and hosting career ==
At some point, Mayol decided to start modeling. In 2006. He traveled to Jinjiang, China for the 2006 Manhunt International pageant as a representative of the United States (East Coast), and ended up winning the pageant. With this title, he internationalized his modeling career and acquired the title of "Top Model".

Mayol has also served as a judge in the 2007 Mr. Panama competition. In 2008, he moved to Mexico to join the CEA of Televisa. In 2008, became host of the "YouTV" E!, which covered the events and interviewed figures in the entertainment and social environment.

Since 2009, Mayol has served as one of the hosts of Pégate al Medio Día on WAPA-TV. He has also served as the host of Idol Puerto Rico since 2011.

Preceded by Tolgahan Sayisman	Manhunt International; 2006	Succeeded by Jeffrey Zheng
