= List of barrios and sectors of Loíza, Puerto Rico =

Like all municipalities of Puerto Rico, Loíza is subdivided into administrative units called barrios, which are, in contemporary times, roughly comparable to minor civil divisions, (and means wards or boroughs or neighborhoods in English). The barrios and subbarrios, in turn, are further subdivided into smaller local populated place areas/units called sectores (sectors in English). The types of sectores may vary, from normally sector to urbanización to reparto to barriada to residencial, among others. Some sectors appear in two barrios.

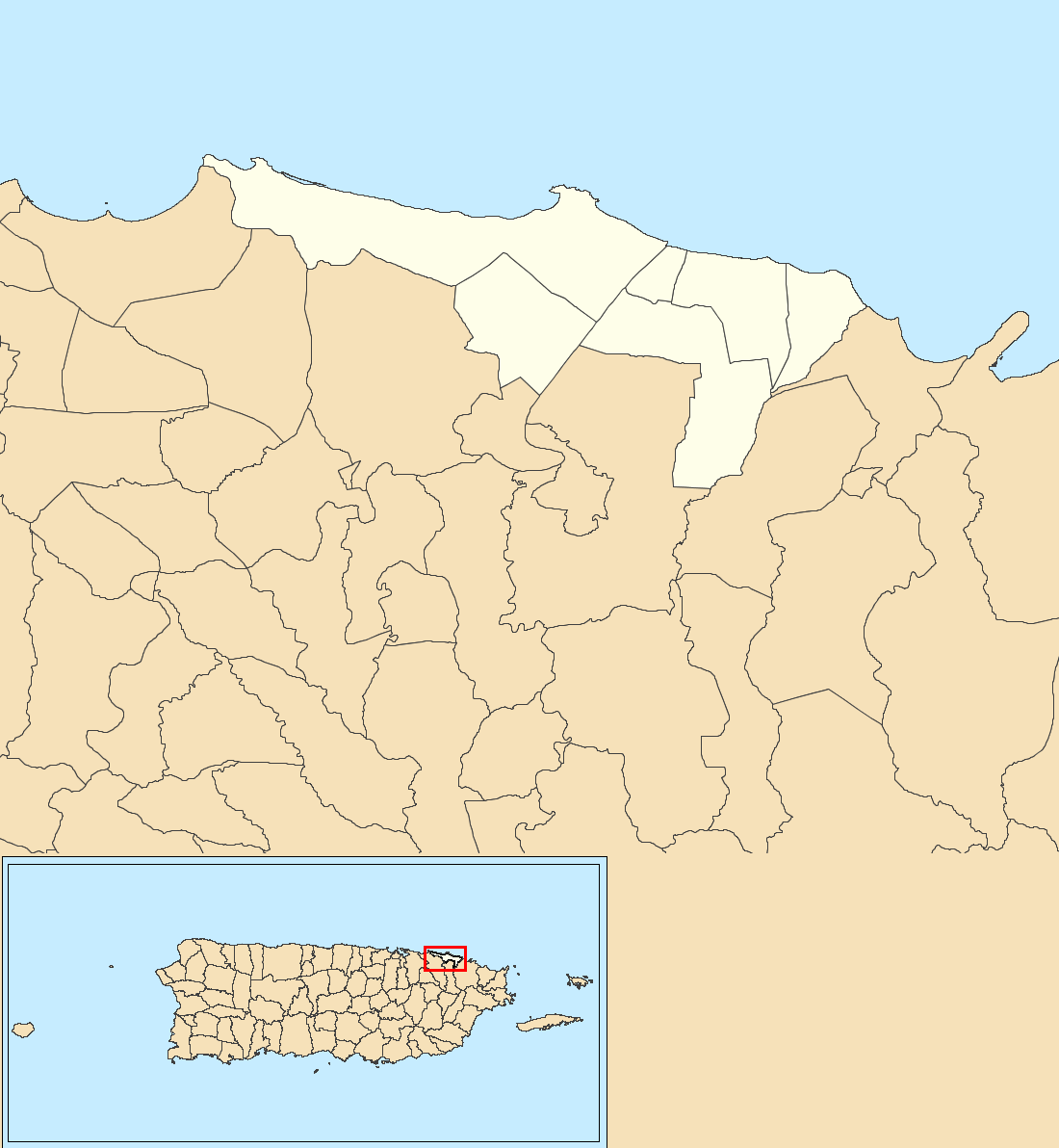
Loíza map with barrio subdivisions

== List of sectors by barrio ==
=== Canóvanas ===
- Apartamentos River Oak Villas
- Camino Los Peñas
- Égida Emannuel de Marrero Inc.
- Extensión Villas de Loíza
- Sector Palmarejo
- Urbanización Country View
- Urbanización Loíza Estates
- Urbanización Villas de Loíza

=== Loíza barrio-pueblo ===
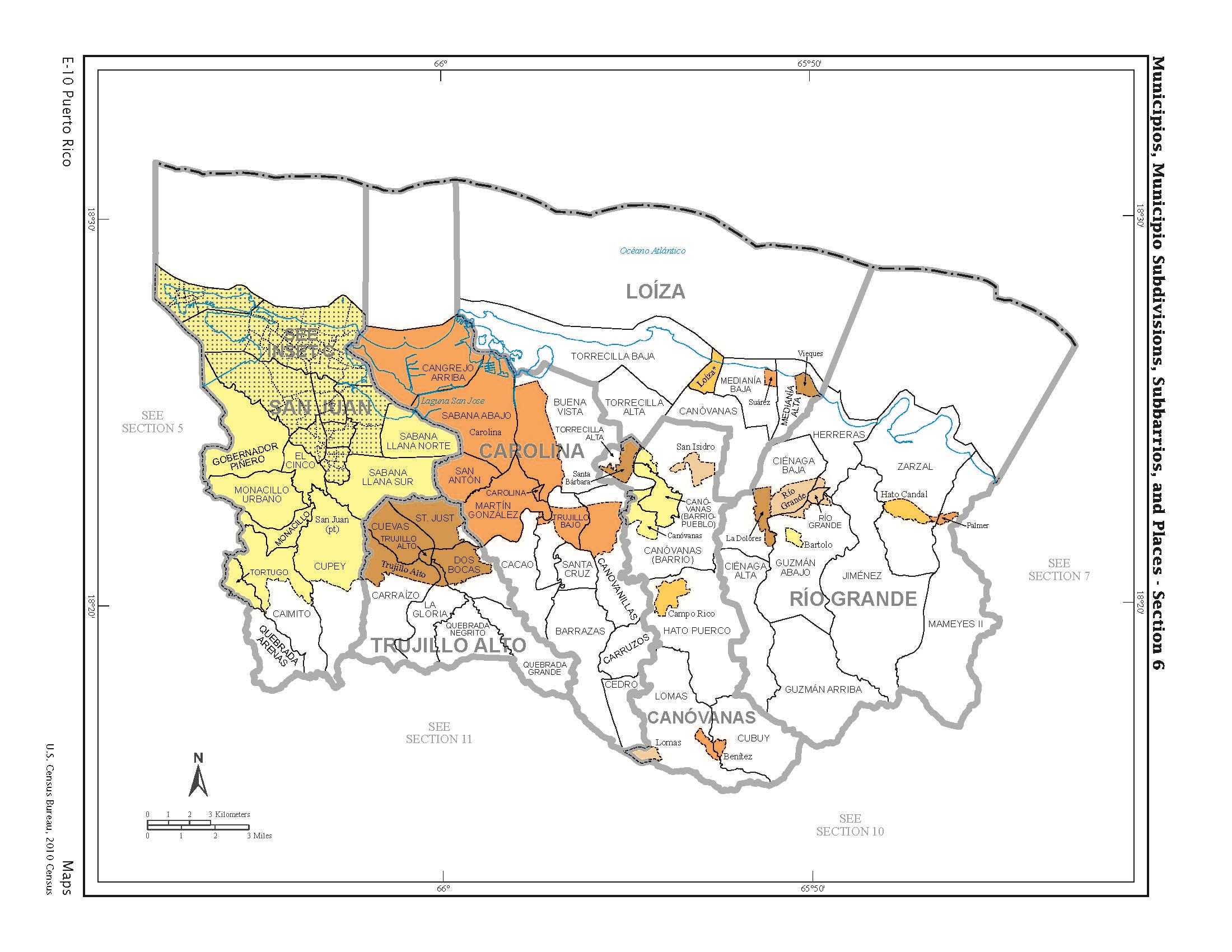
US 2010 Census map of Loíza, and some neighboring municipalities

- Las Cuevas (Carreteras 187, 951, 957)
- Loíza Home For The Elderly
- Residencial Brisas de Loíza
- Residencial Jardines de Loíza
- Residencial San Patricio
- Residencial Yuquiyú
- Sector Hacienda Grande (Villa Álvarez, Villa Vaca)
- Sector La Planta
- Sector Los Plaza
- Sector Los Salgado
- Sector Villa Cañona
- Sector Villa Cañona II
- Urbanización Jardines de Loíza
- Urbanización Santiago (Villa Repollo)

=== Medianía Alta ===
- Comunidad Los Sánchez
- Condominio Costa Mar West
- Condominio Villa del Mar Beach Resort
- Costa Mar Apartments
- El Ceiba
- Melilla
- Miñi Miñi
- Parcelas Vieques
- Pueblo del Niño
- Sector Colobó
- Sector El Parrilla
- Sector Las Carreras
- Sector Los Calcaño
- Sector Los Vizcarrondo
- Sector Villa Batata
- Sector Villa Colobó
- Sector Villa Cristiana
- Tocones
- Urbanización El Portal
- Urbanización Villa Miñi Miñe
- Villa Batata
- Villa Mosquito
- Villa Santos
- Villa Toledo

=== Medianía Baja ===
- Apartamentos Loíza Gardens
- Callejón Los Millonarios
- Carretera 187
- Comunidad Pompeya
- Comunidad Zapatería Pizarro
- Condominio Ocean Point
- Égida La Providencia
- El Martillo
- El Mamey
- Honduras
- La Gallera
- Malibu Apartments
- Parcelas Suárez
- Sector El Trompo
- Sector Jobos
- Sector La 23
- Sector Los Boria
- Sector Los Parrilla
- Sector Richard
- Sector Villa del Carmen
- Sector Villa Kennedy
- Urbanización El Cabo
- Urbanización Estancias del Río
- Urbanización Palmarena
- Urbanización Santiago Apóstol
- Urbanización Santillana del Mar
- Urbanización Vista del Océano

=== Torrecilla Alta ===
There are no sectors in Torrecilla Alta barrio.

=== Torrecilla Baja ===
- Sector El Terraplén
- Sector La Arena
- Sector La Torre
- Sector Las Pajita
- Sector Los Vizcarrondo
- Sector Monte Grande
- Sector Piñones
- Sector Punta Maldonado

== See also ==
- List of communities in Puerto Rico
