= Parroquia del Espíritu Santo y San Patricio =

Historic place in Loíza, Puerto Rico

- Parroquia del Espiritu Santo y San Patricio (Note: The church's name is presented here without the accent on "Espíritu" in conformance with the usage in the church's National Register nomination form and Federal Register announcement of listing.)
- U.S. National Register of Historic Places
- Puerto Rico Historic Sites and Zones
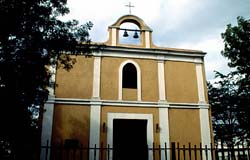
- Parroquia del Espiritu Santo y San Patricio

- Location within Puerto Rico
- Location: Plaza de Loíza; Loíza, Puerto Rico
- Coordinates: 18°26′00″N 65°52′47″W
- Built: 1729
- NRHP reference No.: 76002251
- RNSZH No.: 2000-(RMSJ)-00-JP-SH

Significant dates
- Added to NRHP: September 8, 1976
- Designated RNSZH: February 3, 2000

The Parroquia del Espíritu Santo y San Patricio (English: Parish Church of the Holy Spirit and Saint Patrick), constructed in 1645, is one of Puerto Rico's oldest Catholic parish churches. It is located in the main plaza of the municipality of Loíza, Puerto Rico.

The church was listed on the U.S. National Register of Historic Places in 1976. The register's inventory says the church is “unique in the island because of its structure and architectural expression” and represents “the only sample of a fortified religious structure in the island, probably because it was traditionally used as a shelter for hurricanes, floods and other phenomena which it resisted through its massiveness.” The register also says the Loiza parish is "an ethnically distinct community, the only one of its type in Puerto Rico, which is characterized by a rich history of Afro-Hispanic folk and crafts activities."

In 1957, a citizens committee was formed to restore it. The church was listed on the Puerto Rico Register of Historic Sites and Zones in 2000. The church structure has massive walls and buttresses, which has helped it withstand natural disasters over the centuries. The church, named after Saint Patrick, was enlarged to its present size in 1729.

== Main architectural details ==
The church is a single-naved barrel vaulted church consisting of 4 bays and a main presbyterium. The National Register of Historic Places says: "These bays are visually and physically separated by arches, which on the inside appear only in slight relief as arches and pilasters, but which in the exterior express their full force in the form of massive buttresses. The intermediate walls between these diminish in thickness as they ascend in height, giving the lateral facades an interesting rhythm which is contained at the presbyterium or East end by the sacristies and at the atrium or West bay by the rectangular volume of the choir balcony. Each lateral facade presents one door without any ornamentation, and three clerestory windows (one per intermediate bay) which internally punch through the barrel vault, thus relieving the visual weight of the interior structure."

The front facade "presents the most interest and is a two-story, three-bay composition with scarce ornamentation," especially on the lower story. On the upper story "the composition is softened by the details of small Tuscan capitals and a somewhat flat and disorganized entablature. The center bay provides all the openings, which consist of a rectangular door, with a small arched window on the second story. Above it is a belfry of provincial baroque flavor, containing two bells within a single open arch."

== See also ==
- National Register of Historic Places listings in eastern Puerto Rico
