= Medianía Baja =

Barrio of Loíza, Puerto Rico

- Barrio
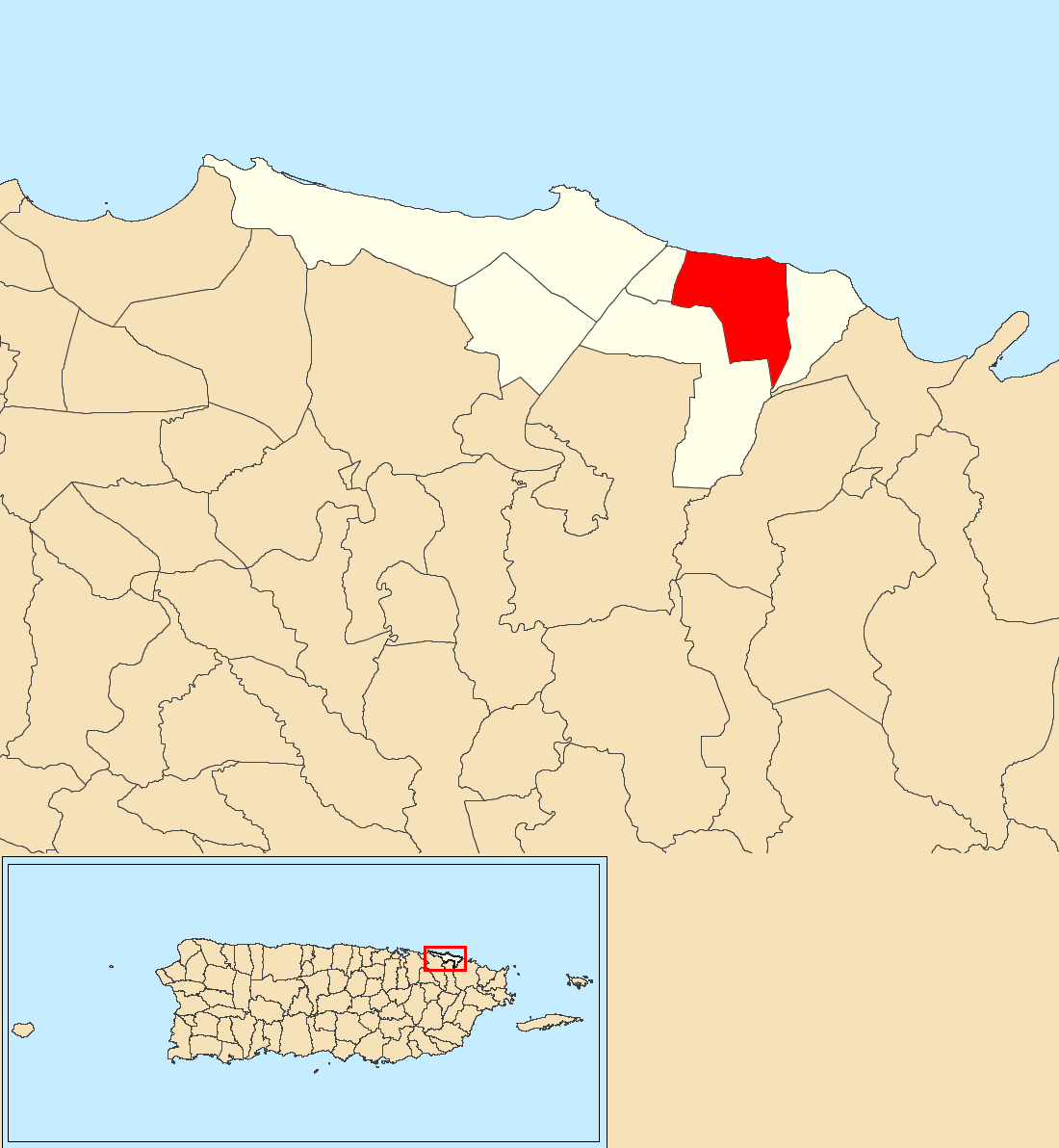
- Location of Medianía Baja within the municipality of Loíza shown in red

- Location of Puerto Rico
- Coordinates: 18°25′18″N 65°51′24″W
- Commonwealth: Puerto Rico
- Municipality: Loíza

Area
  - Total: 2.95 sq mi (7.6 km^{2})
  - Land: 2.51 sq mi (6.5 km^{2})
  - Water: 0.44 sq mi (1.1 km^{2})
- Elevation: 10 ft (3.0 m)

Population (2010)
  - Total: 8,781
  - Density: 3,526.5/sq mi (1,361.6/km^{2})
- Source: 2010 Census
- Time zone: UTC−4 (AST)

Medianía Baja is a barrio in the municipality of Loíza, Puerto Rico. Its population in 2010 was 8,781.

== History ==
Medianía Baja was in Spain's gazetteers until Puerto Rico was ceded by Spain in the aftermath of the Spanish–American War under the terms of the Treaty of Paris of 1898 and became an unincorporated territory of the United States. In 1899, the United States Department of War conducted a census of Puerto Rico finding that the combined population of Medianía Baja and Medianía Alta barrios was 2,296.

Historical population
Census	Pop.	Note	%±
1910	1,518		—
1920	1,707		12.5%
1930	3,399		99.1%
1940	2,506		−26.3%
1950	2,277		−9.1%
1960	3,952		73.6%
1970	4,608		16.6%
1980	5,765		25.1%
1990	7,421		28.7%
2000	8,911		20.1%
2010	8,781		−1.5%
U.S. Decennial Census; 1900 (N/A) 1910-1930; 1930-1950 1980-2000 2010

== Features ==
An annual festival including cuisine from "Lula" is held in this barrio every March.

== Sectors ==
Barrios (which are, in contemporary times, roughly comparable to minor civil divisions) in turn are further subdivided into smaller local populated place areas/units called sectores (sectors in English). The types of sectores may vary, from normally sector to urbanización to reparto to barriada to residencial, among others.

The following sectors are in Medianía Baja barrio:

Apartamentos Loíza Gardens, Callejón Los Millonarios, Carretera 187, Comunidad Pompeya, Comunidad Zapatería Pizarro, Condominio Ocean Point, Égida La Providencia, El Martillo, El Mamey, Honduras, La Gallera, Malibu Apartments, Parcelas Suárez, Sector El Trompo, Sector Jobos, Sector La 23, Sector Los Boria, Sector Los Parrilla, Sector Richard, Sector Villa del Carmen, Sector Villa Kennedy, Urbanización El Cabo, Urbanización Estancias del Río, Urbanización Palmarena, Urbanización Santiago Apóstol, Urbanización Santillana del Mar, and Urbanización Vista del Océano.

== See also ==
- List of communities in Puerto Rico
- List of barrios and sectors of Loíza, Puerto Rico
