= Medianía Alta =

Barrio of Loíza, Puerto Rico

- Barrio
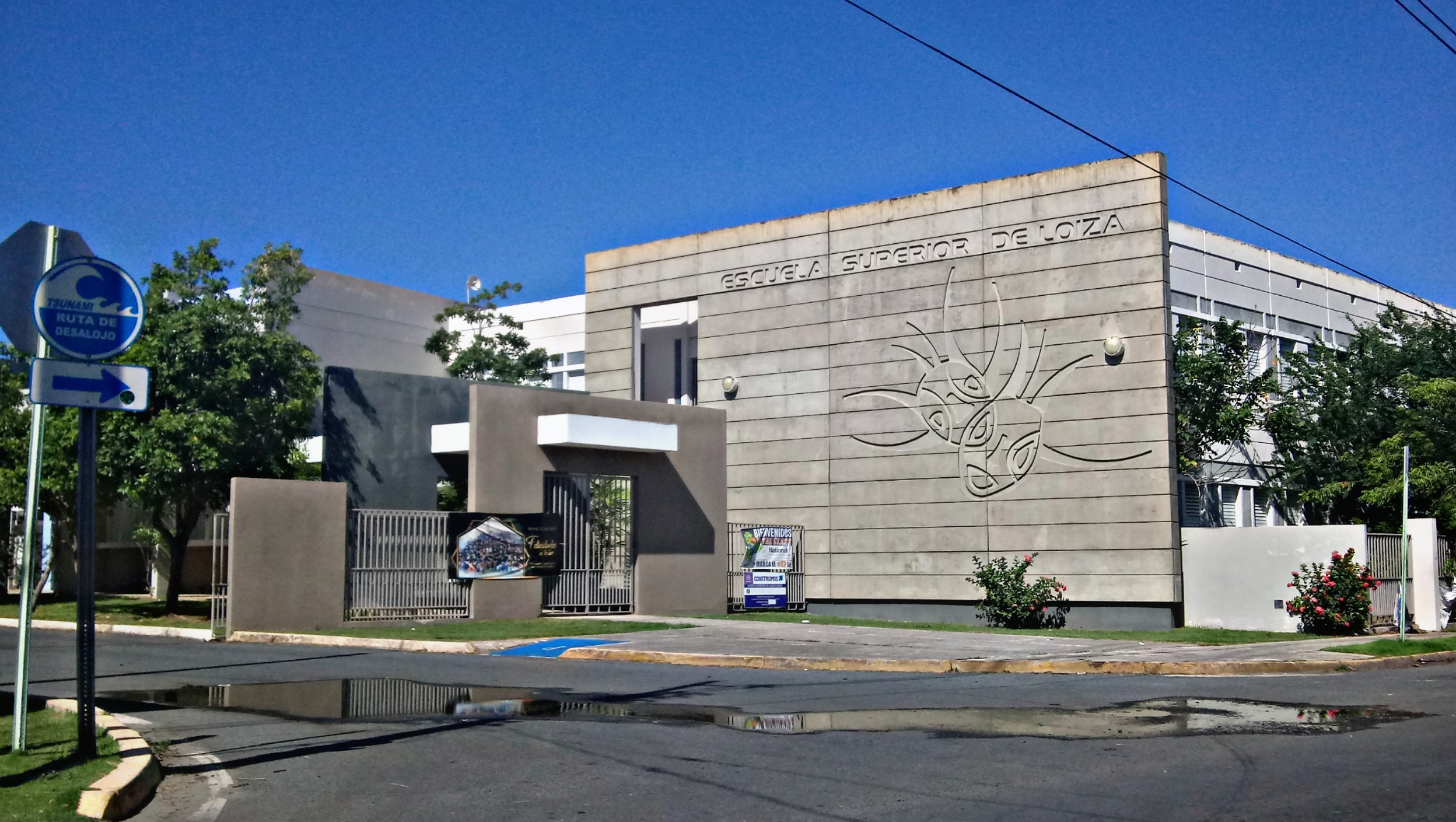
- High school in Medianía Alta

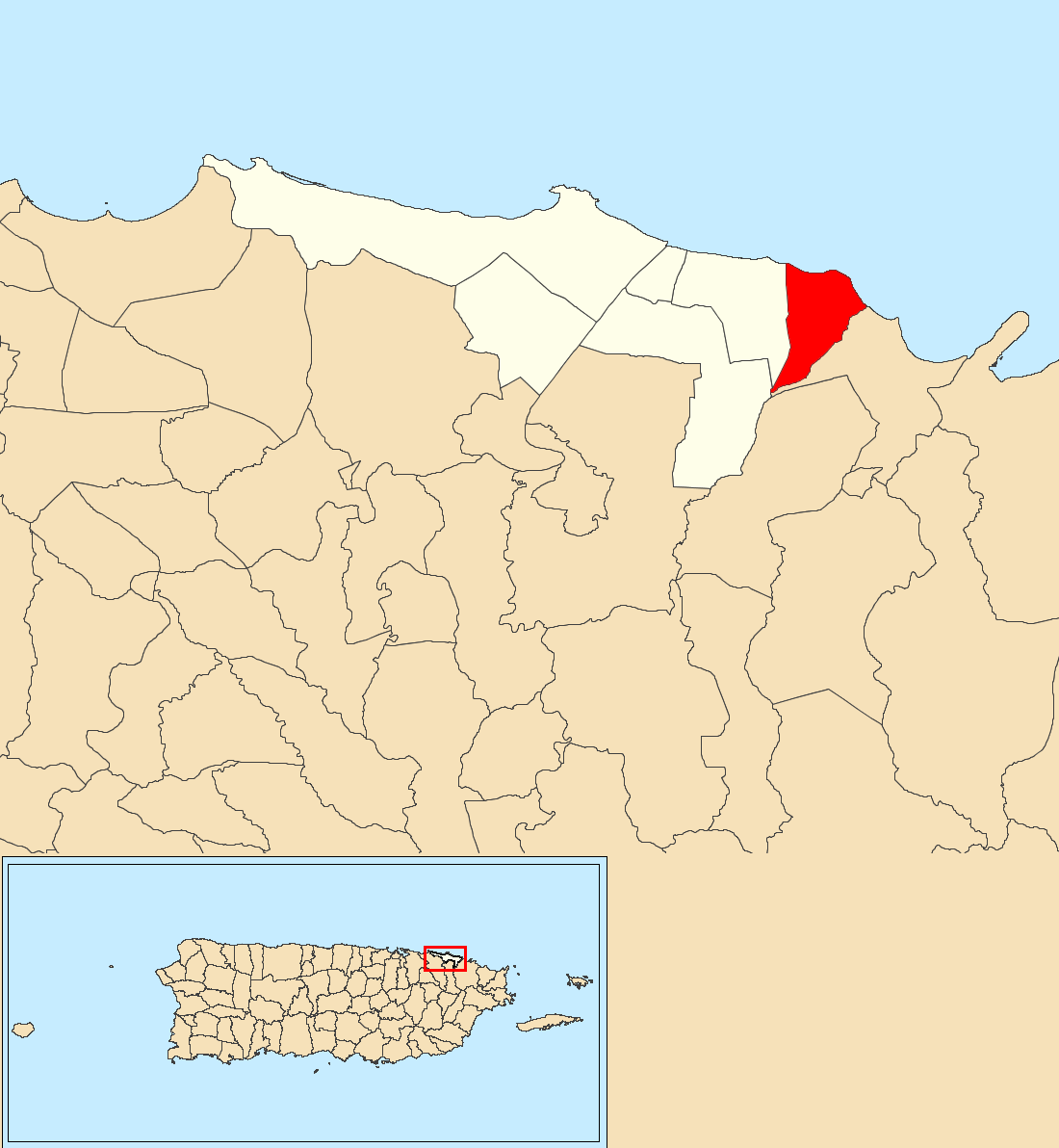
- Location of Medianía Alta within the municipality of Loíza shown in red

- Location of Puerto Rico
- Coordinates: 18°25′37″N 65°50′25″W
- Commonwealth: Puerto Rico
- Municipality: Loíza

Area
  - Total: 2.29 sq mi (5.9 km^{2})
  - Land: 1.63 sq mi (4.2 km^{2})
  - Water: 0.66 sq mi (1.7 km^{2})
- Elevation: 10 ft (3.0 m)

Population (2010)
  - Total: 8,019
  - Density: 4,860/sq mi (1,880/km^{2})
- Source: 2010 Census
- Time zone: UTC−4 (AST)

Medianía Alta is a barrio in the municipality of Loíza, Puerto Rico. Its population in 2010 was 8,019.

== History ==
Medianía Alta was in Spain's gazetteers until Puerto Rico was ceded by Spain in the aftermath of the Spanish–American War under the terms of the Treaty of Paris of 1898 and became an unincorporated territory of the United States. In 1899, the United States Department of War conducted a census of Puerto Rico finding that the combined population of Medianía Alta and Medianía Baja barrios was 2,296.

Historical population
Census	Pop.	Note	%±
1910	1,334		—
1920	1,708		28.0%
1930	2,197		28.6%
1940	2,608		18.7%
1950	3,723		42.8%
1960	4,254		14.3%
1970	6,164		44.9%
1980	6,754		9.6%
1990	8,231		21.9%
2000	9,482		15.2%
2010	8,019		−15.4%
U.S. Decennial Census; 1900 (N/A) 1910-1930; 1930-1950 1980-2000 2010

== Features ==
The municipal gymnasium is located in Medianía Alta and in 2020, the Puerto Rico Olympic Committee invested in infrastructure for sports in Medianía Alta.

== Sectors ==
Barrios (which are, in contemporary times, roughly comparable to minor civil divisions) in turn are further subdivided into smaller local populated place areas/units called sectores (sectors in English). The types of sectores may vary, from normally sector to urbanización to reparto to barriada to residencial, among others.

The following sectors are in Medianía Alta barrio:

Comunidad Los Sánchez, Condominio Costa Mar West, Condominio Villa del Mar Beach Resort, Costa Mar Apartments, El Ceiba, Melilla, Miñi Miñe, Parcelas Vieques, Pueblo del Niño, Sector Colobó, Sector El Parrilla, Sector Las Carreras, Sector Los Calcaño, Sector Los Vizcarrondo, Sector Villa Batata, Sector Villa Colobó, Sector Villa Cristiana, Tocones, Urbanización El Portal, Urbanización Villa Miñi Miñe, Villa Batata, Villa Mosquito, Villa Santos, and Villa Toledo.

== Gallery ==
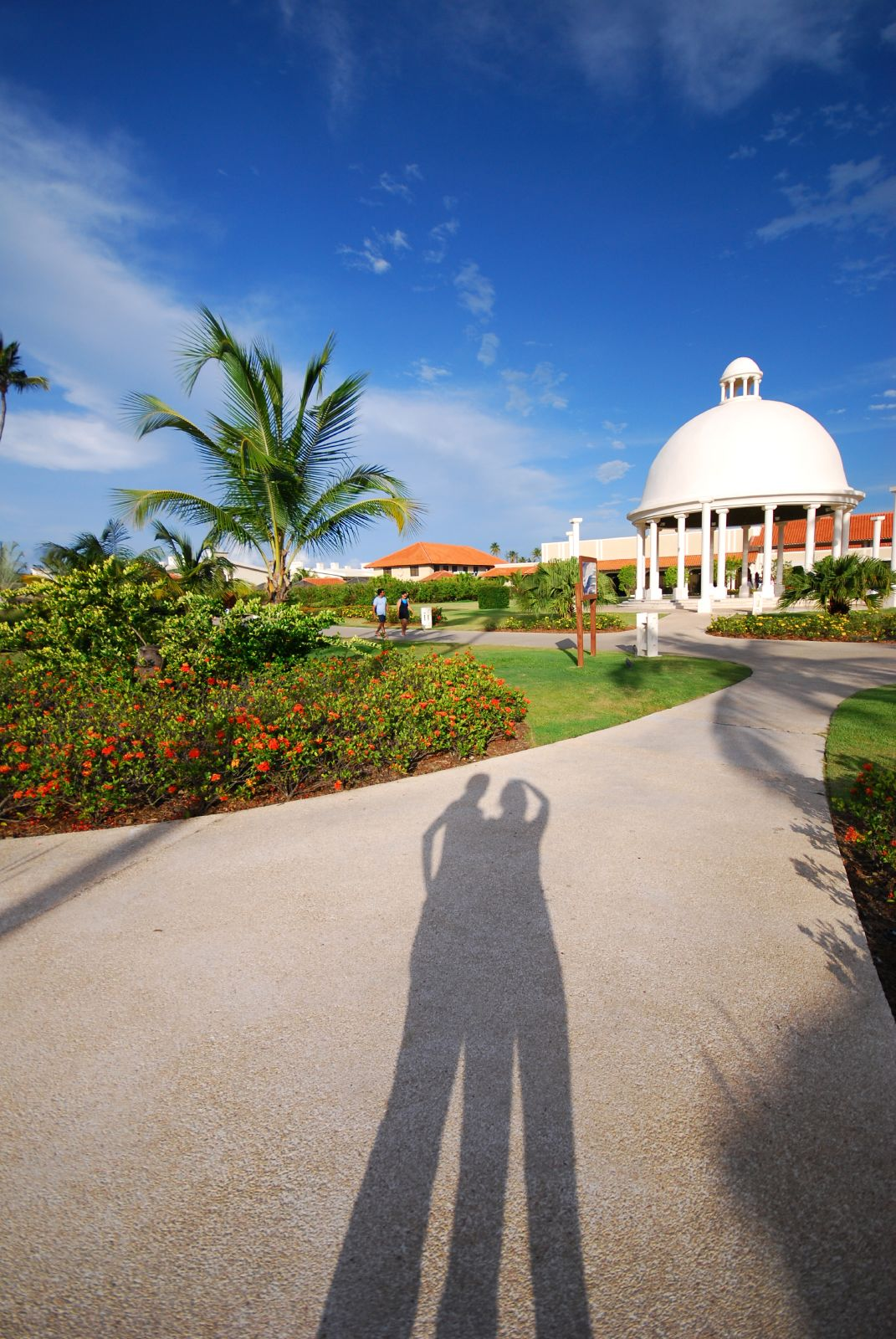
A building and people's shadows in Medianía Alta

== See also ==
- List of communities in Puerto Rico
- List of barrios and sectors of Loíza, Puerto Rico
