= Torrecilla Baja =

Barrio of Loíza, Puerto Rico

- Barrio
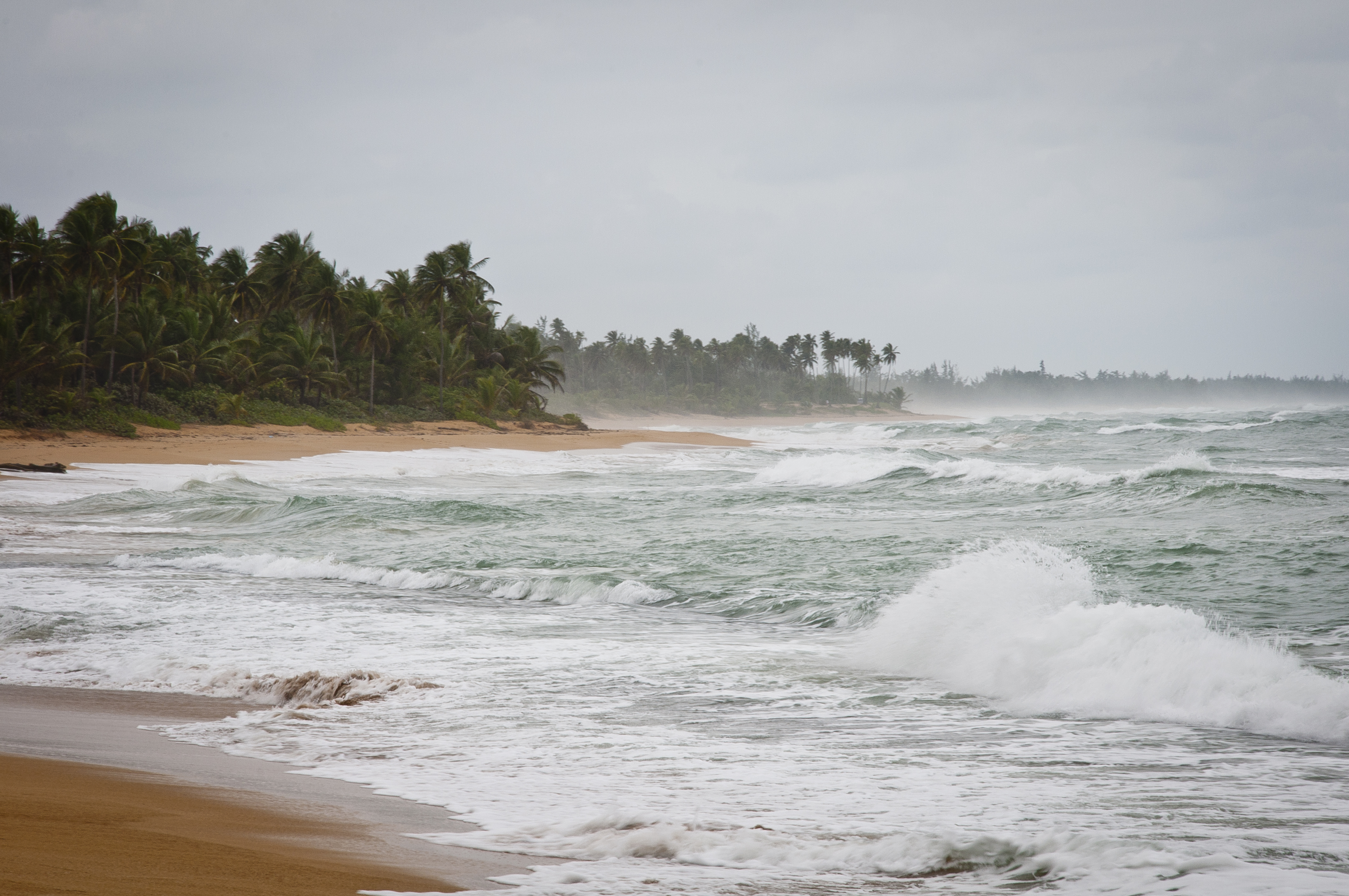
- Piñones beaches in Torrecilla Baja

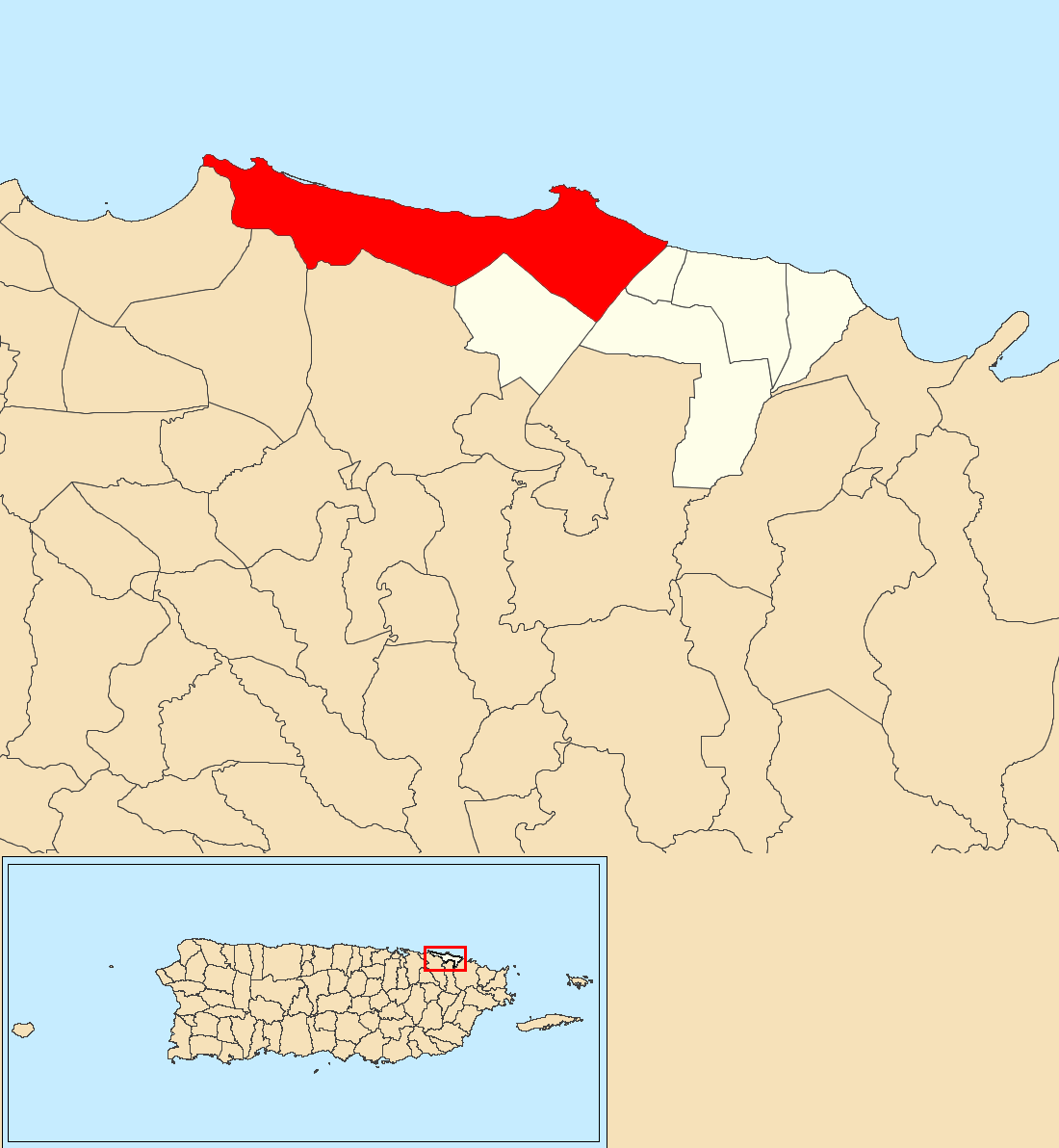
- Location of Torrecilla Baja within the municipality of Loíza shown in red

- Location of Puerto Rico
- Coordinates: 18°26′44″N 65°56′34″W
- Commonwealth: Puerto Rico
- Municipality: Loíza

Area
  - Total: 11.55 sq mi (29.9 km^{2})
  - Land: 7.31 sq mi (18.9 km^{2})
  - Water: 4.24 sq mi (11.0 km^{2})
- Elevation: 0 ft (0 m)

Population (2010)
  - Total: 2,404
  - Density: 328.9/sq mi (127.0/km^{2})
- Source: 2010 Census
- Time zone: UTC−4 (AST)
- ZIP Code: 00772

Torrecilla Baja is a barrio in the municipality of Loíza, Puerto Rico. Torrecilla Baja has eight sectors and its population was 2,404 in 2010. The Piñones State Forest is located in Torrecilla Baja.

== History ==
Torrecilla Baja was in Spain's gazetteers until Puerto Rico was ceded by Spain in the aftermath of the Spanish–American War under the terms of the Treaty of Paris of 1898 and became an unincorporated territory of the United States. In 1899, the United States Department of War conducted a census of Puerto Rico finding that the combined population of Torrecilla Baja and Torrecilla Alta barrios was 1,473.

Historical population
Census	Pop.	Note	%±
1910	721		—
1920	775		7.5%
1930	750		−3.2%
1940	1,177		56.9%
1950	1,283		9.0%
1960	1,359		5.9%
1970	1,240		−8.8%
1980	1,532		23.5%
1990	1,978		29.1%
2000	2,322		17.4%
2010	2,404		3.5%
U.S. Decennial Census; 1900 (N/A) 1910-1930; 1930-1950 1980-2000 2010

== Features ==
The Piñones State Forest is in Torrecilla Baja.

== Sectors ==
Barrios (which are, in contemporary times, roughly comparable to minor civil divisions) in turn are further subdivided into smaller local populated place areas/units called sectores (sectors in English). The types of sectores may vary, from normally sector to urbanización to reparto to barriada to residencial, among others.

The following sectors are in Torrecilla Baja barrio:

Sector El Terraplén, Sector La Arena, Sector La Torre, Sector Las Pajita, Sector Los Vizcarrondo, Sector Monte Grande, Sector Piñones, and Sector Punta Maldonado.

== See also ==
- List of communities in Puerto Rico
- List of barrios and sectors of Loíza, Puerto Rico
