= Torrecilla Alta, Loíza, Puerto Rico =

Barrio of Puerto Rico

Torrecilla Alta
- Barrio
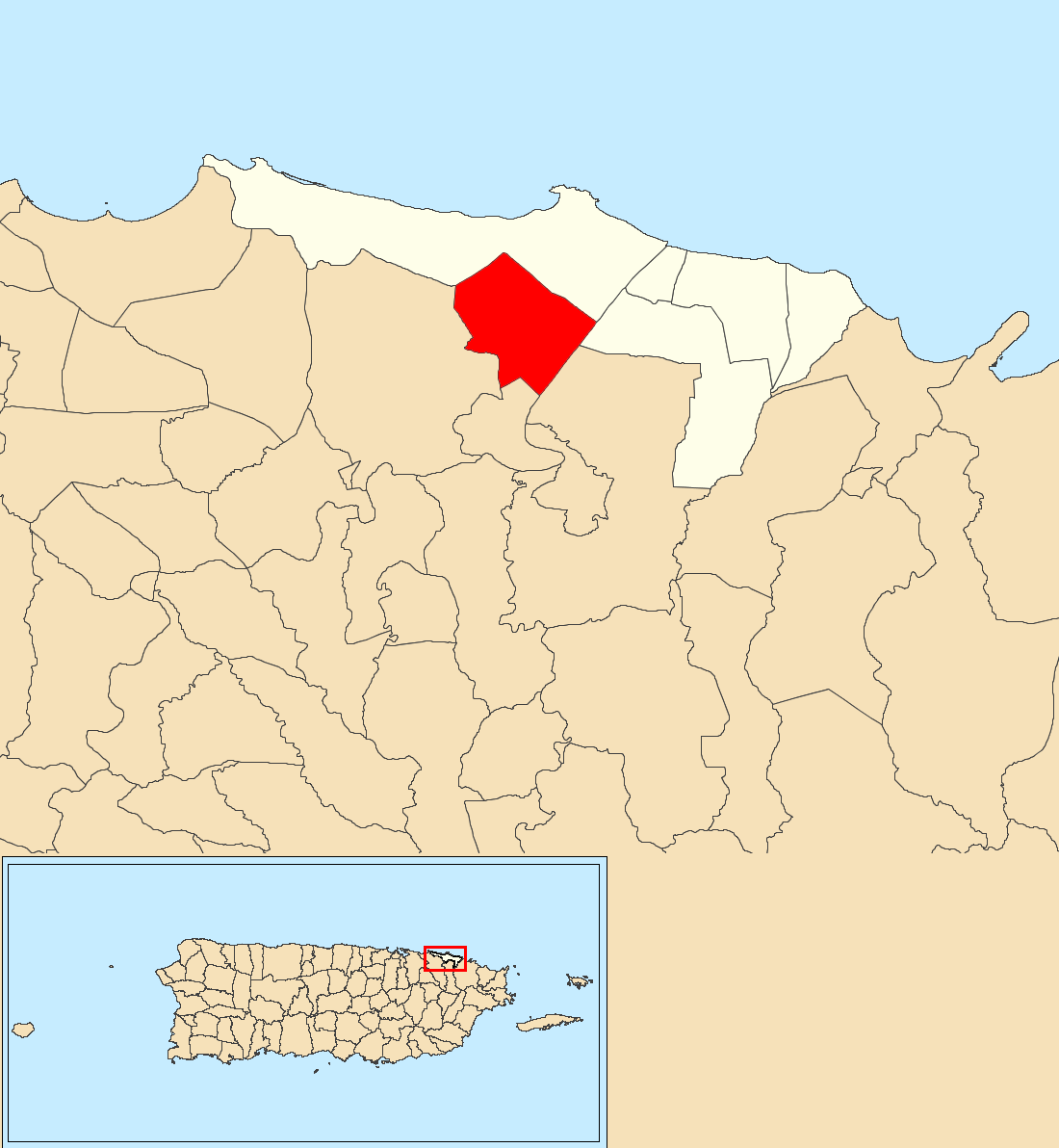
- Location of Torrecilla Alta within the municipality of Loíza shown in red

- Location of Puerto Rico
- Coordinates: 18°25′22″N 65°55′16″W
- Commonwealth: Puerto Rico
- Municipality: Loíza

Area
  - Total: 3.08 sq mi (8.0 km^{2})
  - Land: 3.05 sq mi (7.9 km^{2})
  - Water: 0.03 sq mi (0.078 km^{2})
- Elevation: 10 ft (3.0 m)

Population (2010)
  - Total: 0
- Source: 2010 Census
- Time zone: UTC−4 (AST)

Torrecilla Alta is a barrio in the municipality of Loíza, Puerto Rico. Its population in 2010 was 0.

== History ==
Torrecilla Alta was in Spain's gazetteers until Puerto Rico was ceded by Spain in the aftermath of the Spanish–American War under the terms of the Treaty of Paris of 1898 and became an unincorporated territory of the United States. In 1899, the United States Department of War conducted a census of Puerto Rico finding that the combined population of Torrecilla Alta and Torrecilla Baja barrios was 1,473.

== Features ==
Torrecilla Alta in Loíza shares a border with Torrecillas Alta in Canóvanas, a neighboring municipality. Both are near mangroves and the Río Grande de Loíza. Alligators are known to roam the areas near the mangroves and when discovered, the creatures are moved to a location managed by the Department of Resources.

Historical population
| Census | Pop. | Note | %± |
|---|---|---|---|
| 1910 | 712 | | — |
| 1920 | 779 | | 9.4% |
| 1930 | 1,238 | | 58.9% |
| 1940 | 1,836 | | 48.3% |
| 1950 | 2,356 | | 28.3% |
| 1960 | 2,466 | | 4.7% |
| 1970 | 3,816 | | 54.7% |
| 1980 | 0 | | −100.0% |
| 1990 | 0 | | — |
U.S. Decennial Census; 1900 (N/A) 1910-1930; 1930-1950 1980-2000 (N/A) 2010

== See also ==
- List of communities in Puerto Rico
- List of barrios and sectors of Loíza, Puerto Rico
