= Loíza barrio-pueblo =

Historical and administrative center (seat) of Loíza, Puerto Rico

Loíza barrio-pueblo Pueblo de Loíza
- Municipality Seat
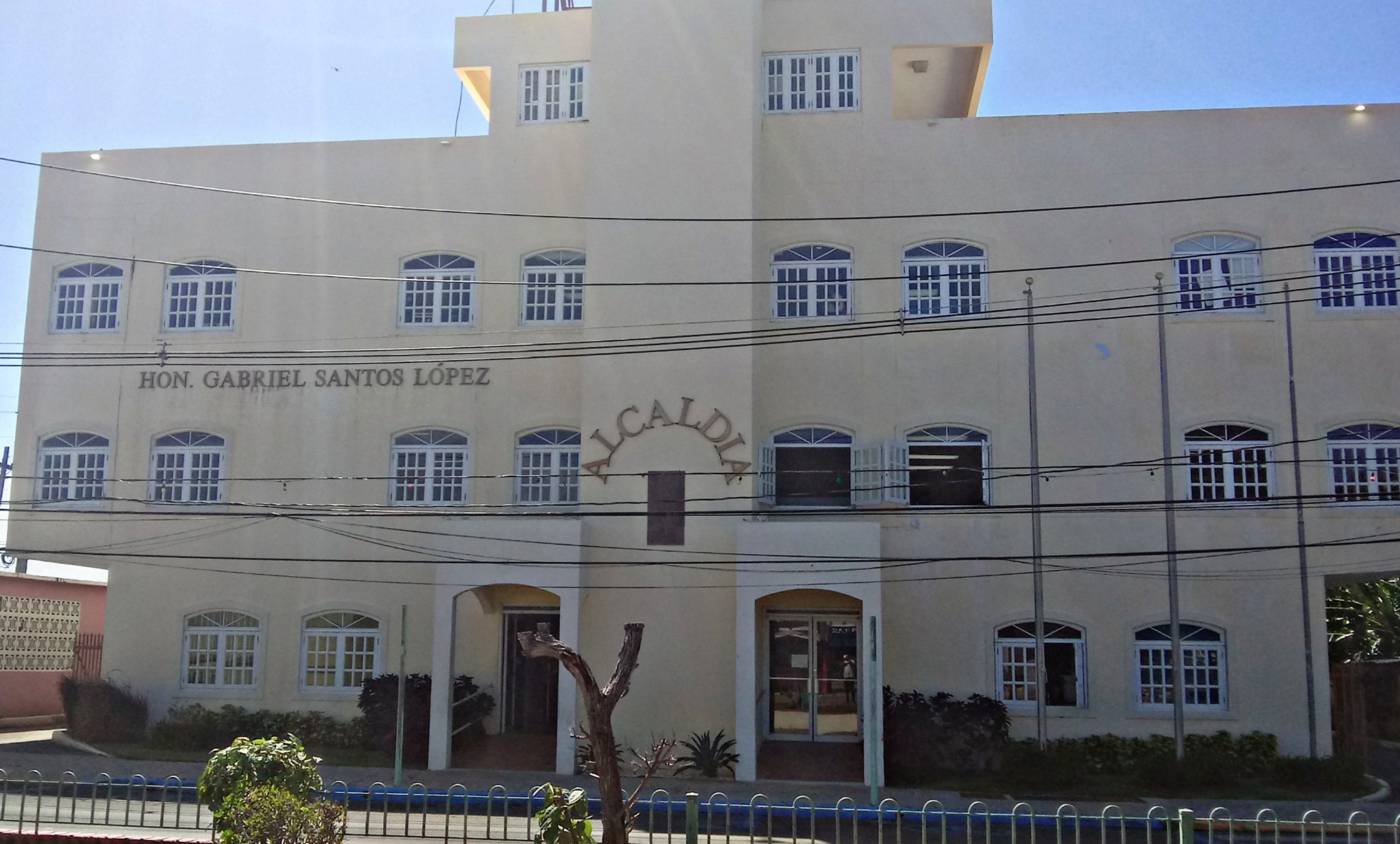
- City Hall in Loíza barrio-pueblo

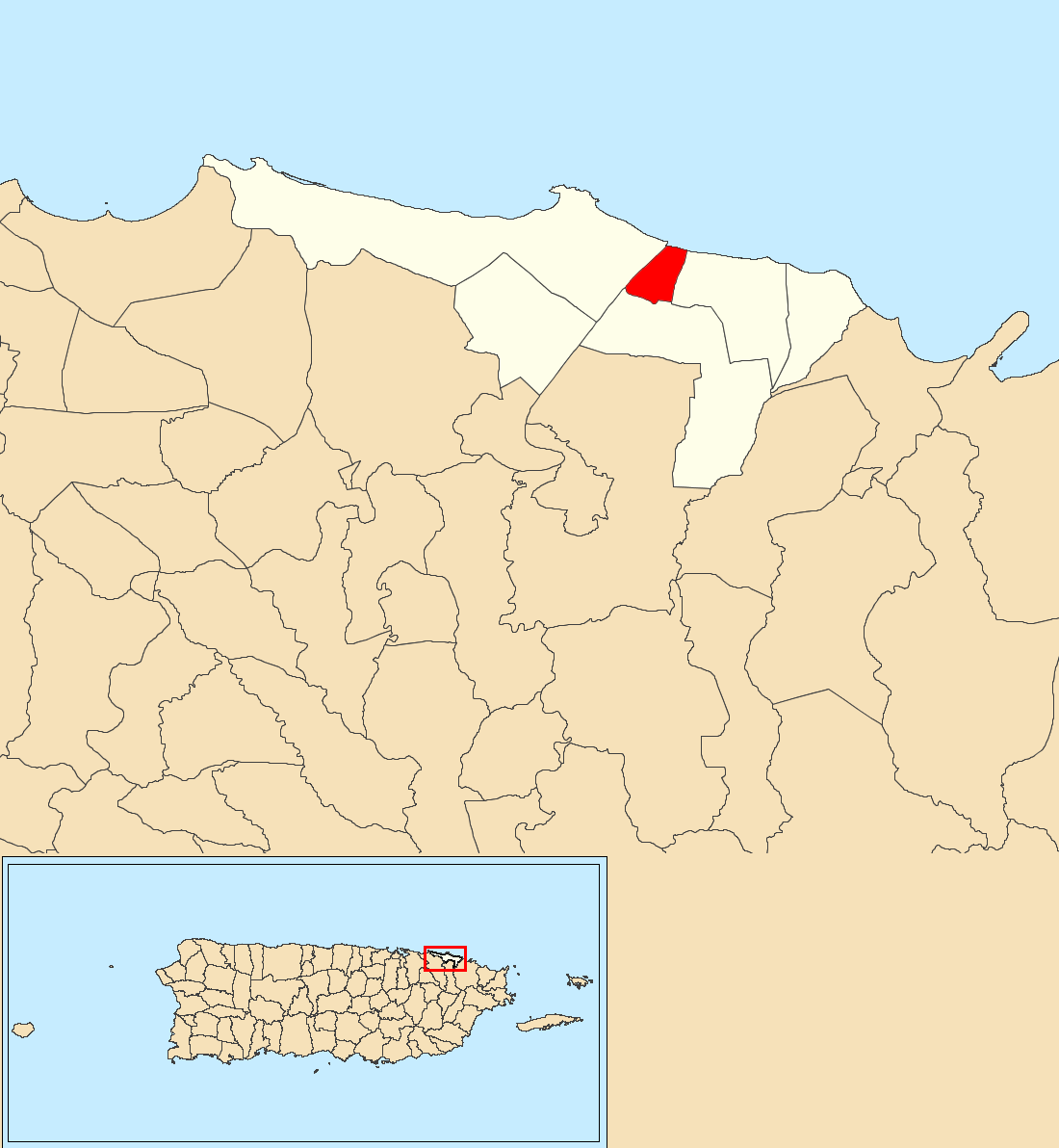
- Location of Loíza barrio-pueblo within the municipality of Loíza shown in red

- Location of Puerto Rico
- Coordinates: 18°25′59″N 65°52′41″W
- Commonwealth: Puerto Rico
- Municipality: Loíza

Area
  - Total: 0.66 sq mi (1.7 km^{2})
  - Land: 0.52 sq mi (1.3 km^{2})
  - Water: 0.14 sq mi (0.36 km^{2})
- Elevation: 10 ft (3.0 m)

Population (2010)
  - Total: 3,875
  - Density: 7,451.9/sq mi (2,877.2/km^{2})
- Source: 2010 Census
- Time zone: UTC−4 (AST)

Loíza barrio-pueblo is a barrio and the administrative center (seat) of Loíza, a municipality of Puerto Rico. Its population in 2010 was 3,875.

== The central plaza and its church ==
As was customary in Spain, in Puerto Rico, the municipality has a barrio called pueblo which contains a central plaza, the municipal buildings (city hall), and a Catholic church. Fiestas patronales (patron saint festivals) are held in the central plaza every year.

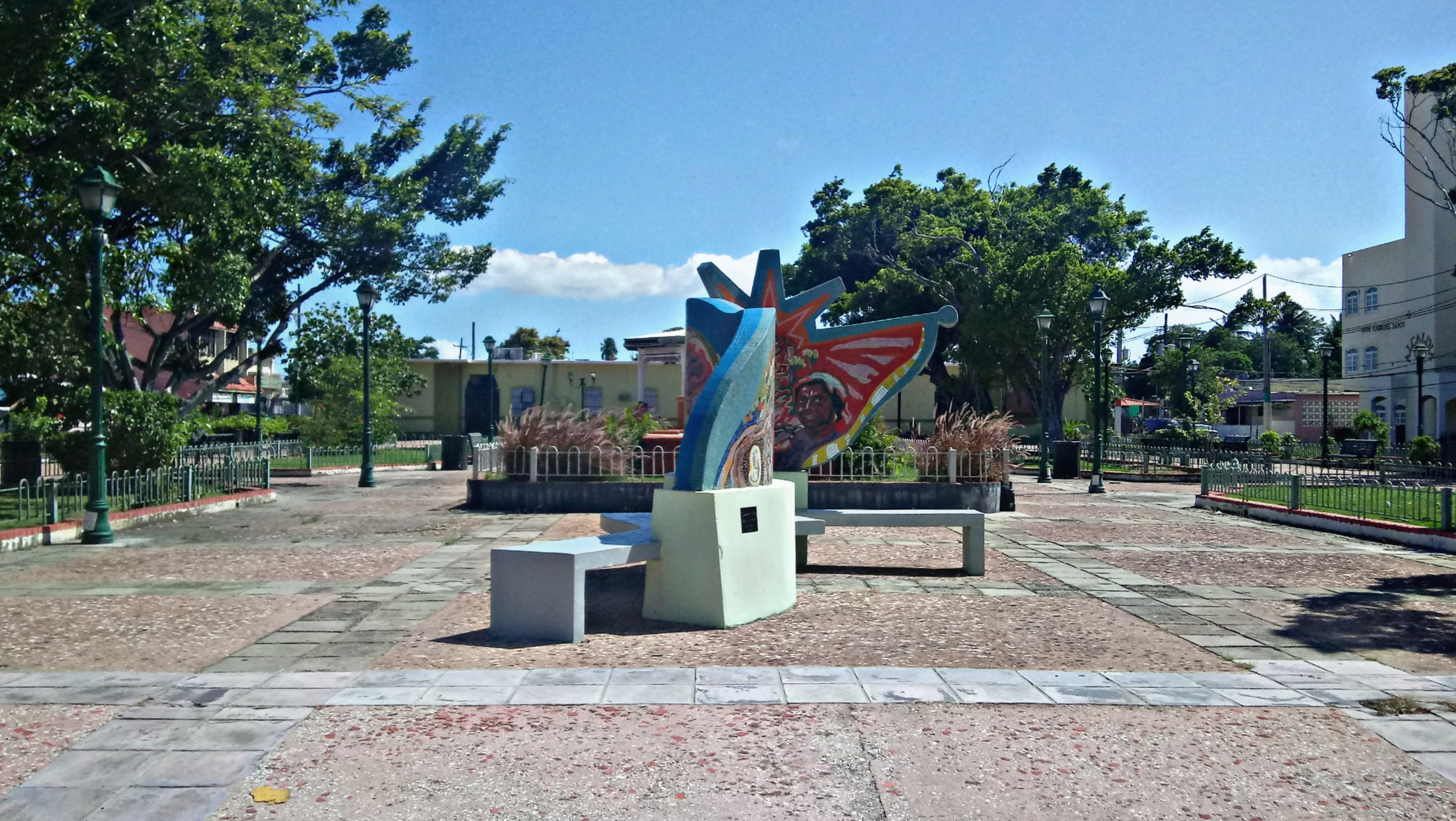
Central plaza in Loíza barrio-pueblo

The central plaza, or square, is a place for official and unofficial recreational events and a place where people can gather and socialize from dusk to dawn. The Laws of the Indies, Spanish law, which regulated life in Puerto Rico in the early 19th century, stated the plaza's purpose was for "the parties" (celebrations, festivities) (Spanish: a propósito para las fiestas), and that the square should be proportionally large enough for the number of neighbors (Spanish: grandeza proporcionada al número de vecinos). These Spanish regulations also stated that the streets nearby should be comfortable portals for passersby, protecting them from the elements: sun and rain.

Located across the central plaza in Loíza barrio-pueblo is the Parroquia Espíritu Santo y San Patricio, a Roman Catholic church.

== History ==
Loíza barrio-pueblo was in Spain's gazetteers until Puerto Rico was ceded by Spain in the aftermath of the Spanish–American War under the terms of the Treaty of Paris of 1898 and became an unincorporated territory of the United States. In 1899, the United States Department of War conducted a census of Puerto Rico finding that the population of Pueblo was 833.

Historical population
Census	Pop.	Note	%±
1900	833		—
1910	1,021		22.6%
1920	1,077		5.5%
1930	1,606		49.1%
1940	2,356		46.7%
1950	2,872		21.9%
1960	3,097		7.8%
1970	3,350		8.2%
1980	3,932		17.4%
1990	4,300		9.4%
2000	4,123		−4.1%
2010	3,875		−6.0%
U.S. Decennial Census; 1899 (shown as 1900) 1910-1930; 1930-1950 1980-2000 2010

== Sectors ==
Barrios (which are, in contemporary times, roughly comparable to minor civil divisions) in turn are further subdivided into smaller local populated place areas/units called sectores (sectors in English). The types of sectores may vary, from normally sector to urbanización to reparto to barriada to residencial, among others.

The following sectors are in Loíza barrio-pueblo:

Las Cuevas (Carreteras 187, 951, 957), Loíza Home For The Elder, Residencial Brisas de Loíza, Residencial Jardines de Loíza, Residencial San Patricio, Residencial Yuquiyú, Sector Hacienda Grande (Villa Álvarez, Villa Vaca), Sector La Planta, Sector Los Plaza, Sector Los Salgado, Sector Villa Cañona, Sector Villa Cañona II, Urbanización Jardines de Loíza, and Urbanización Santiago (Villa Repollo).

== See also ==
- List of communities in Puerto Rico
- List of barrios and sectors of Loíza, Puerto Rico
