= Canóvanas, Loíza, Puerto Rico =

Barrio of Puerto Rico

Canóvanas
- Barrio
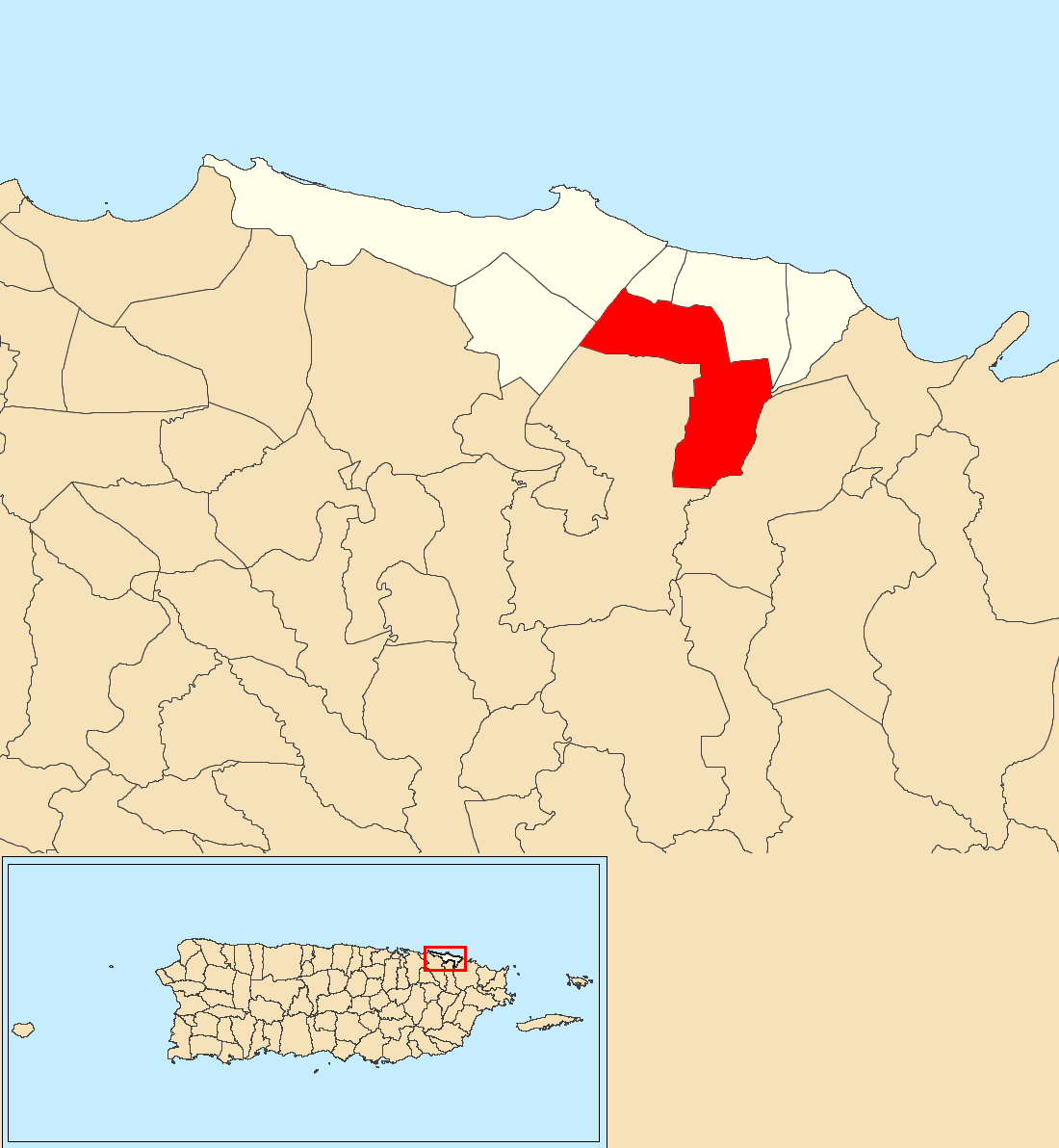
- Location of Canóvanas within the municipality of Loíza shown in red

- Location of Puerto Rico
- Coordinates: 18°23′28″N 65°51′52″W
- Commonwealth: Puerto Rico
- Municipality: Loíza

Area
  - Total: 4.40 sq mi (11.4 km^{2})
  - Land: 4.35 sq mi (11.3 km^{2})
  - Water: 0.05 sq mi (0.13 km^{2})
- Elevation: 0 ft (0 m)

Population (2010)
  - Total: 6,981
  - Density: 1,604.8/sq mi (619.6/km^{2})
- Source: 2010 Census
- Time zone: UTC−4 (AST)

Canóvanas is a barrio in the municipality of Loíza, Puerto Rico. Its population in 2010 was 6,981.

== History ==
Canóvanas was in Spain's gazetteers until Puerto Rico was ceded by Spain in the aftermath of the Spanish–American War under the terms of the Treaty of Paris of 1898 and became an unincorporated territory of the United States. In 1899, the United States Department of War conducted a census of Puerto Rico finding that the population of Canóvanas barrio was 1,942.

Historical population
Census	Pop.	Note	%±
1900	1,942		—
1910	2,327		19.8%
1920	3,147		35.2%
1930	3,316		5.4%
1940	2,950		−11.0%
1950	2,966		0.5%
1960	3,174		7.0%
1970	0		−100.0%
1980	2,884		—
1990	7,377		155.8%
2000	7,699		4.4%
2010	6,981		−9.3%
U.S. Decennial Census; 1899 (shown as 1900) 1910-1930; 1930-1950 1980-2000 2010

== Sectors ==
Barrios (which are, in contemporary times, roughly comparable to minor civil divisions) in turn are further subdivided into smaller local populated place areas/units called sectores (sectors in English). The types of sectores may vary, from normally sector to urbanización to reparto to barriada to residencial, among others.

The following sectors are in Canóvanas barrio:

Apartamentos River Oak Villas, Camino Los Peñas, Égida Emannuel de Marrero Inc., Extensión Villas de Loíza, Sector Palmarejo, Urbanización Country View, Urbanización Loíza Estates, and Urbanización Villas de Loíza.

== See also ==
- List of communities in Puerto Rico
- List of barrios and sectors of Loíza, Puerto Rico
