= Loíza, Puerto Rico =

Town and municipality in Puerto Rico

Loíza Municipio de Loíza
- Town and Municipality
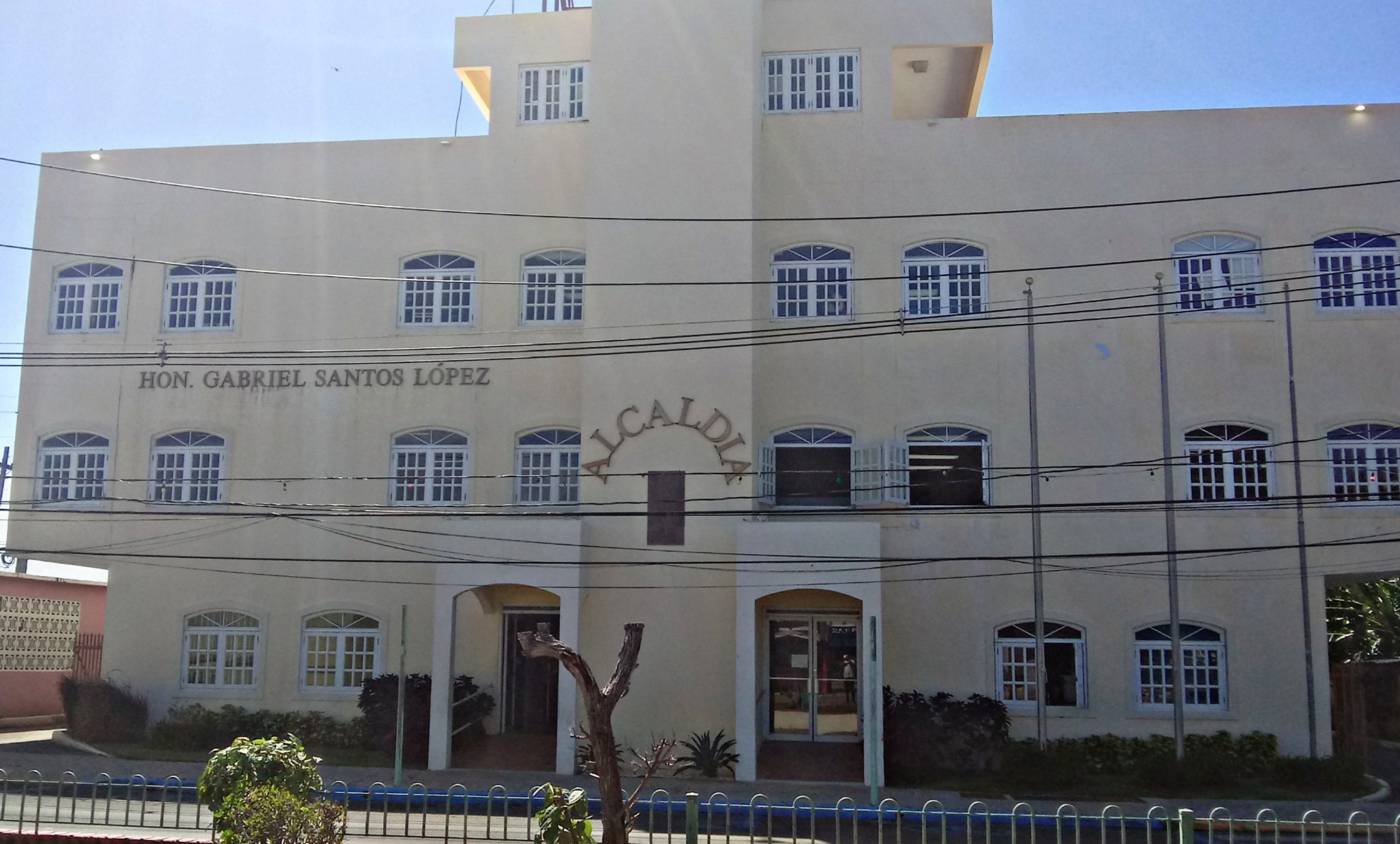
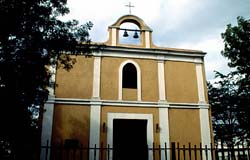
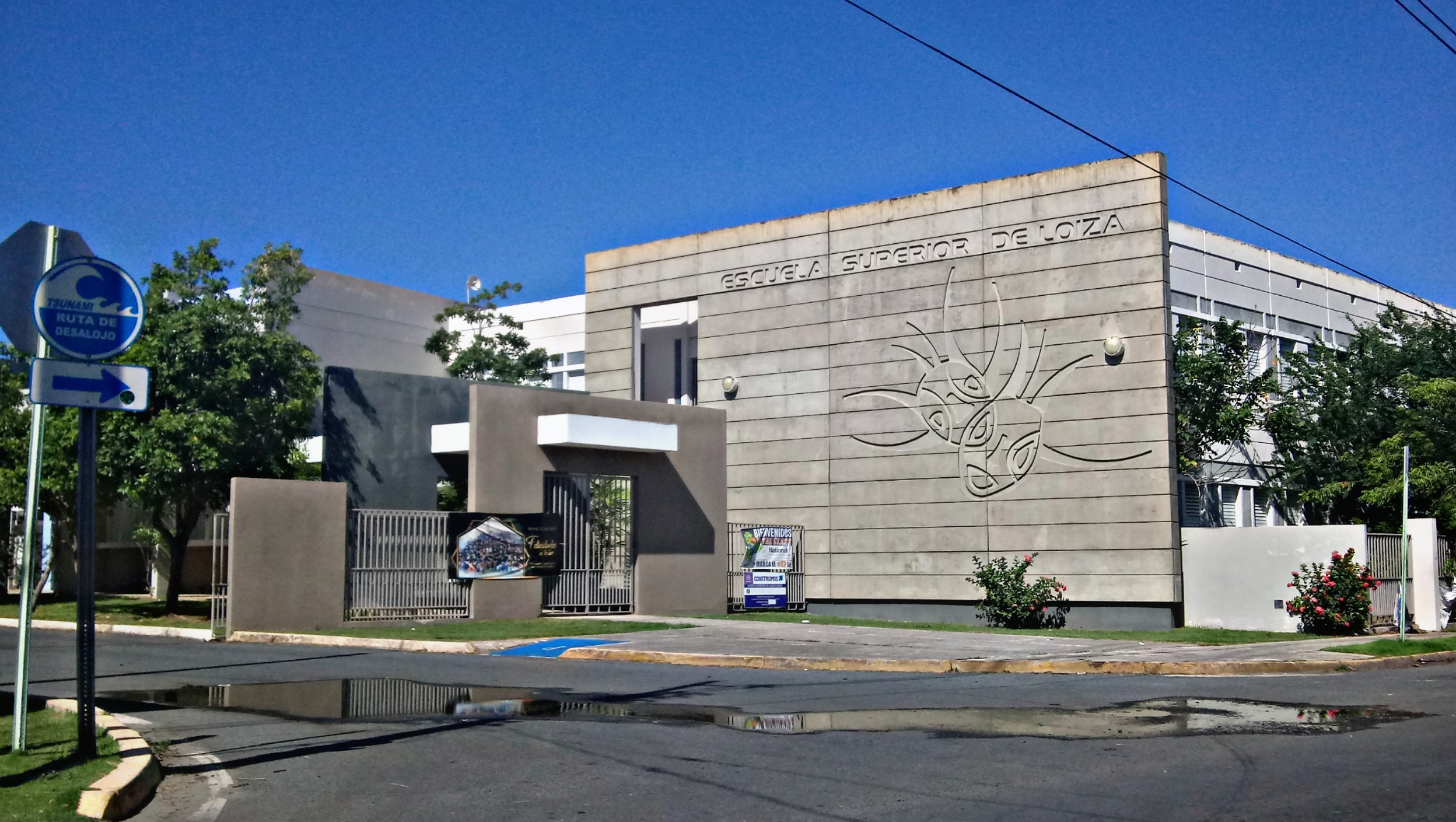
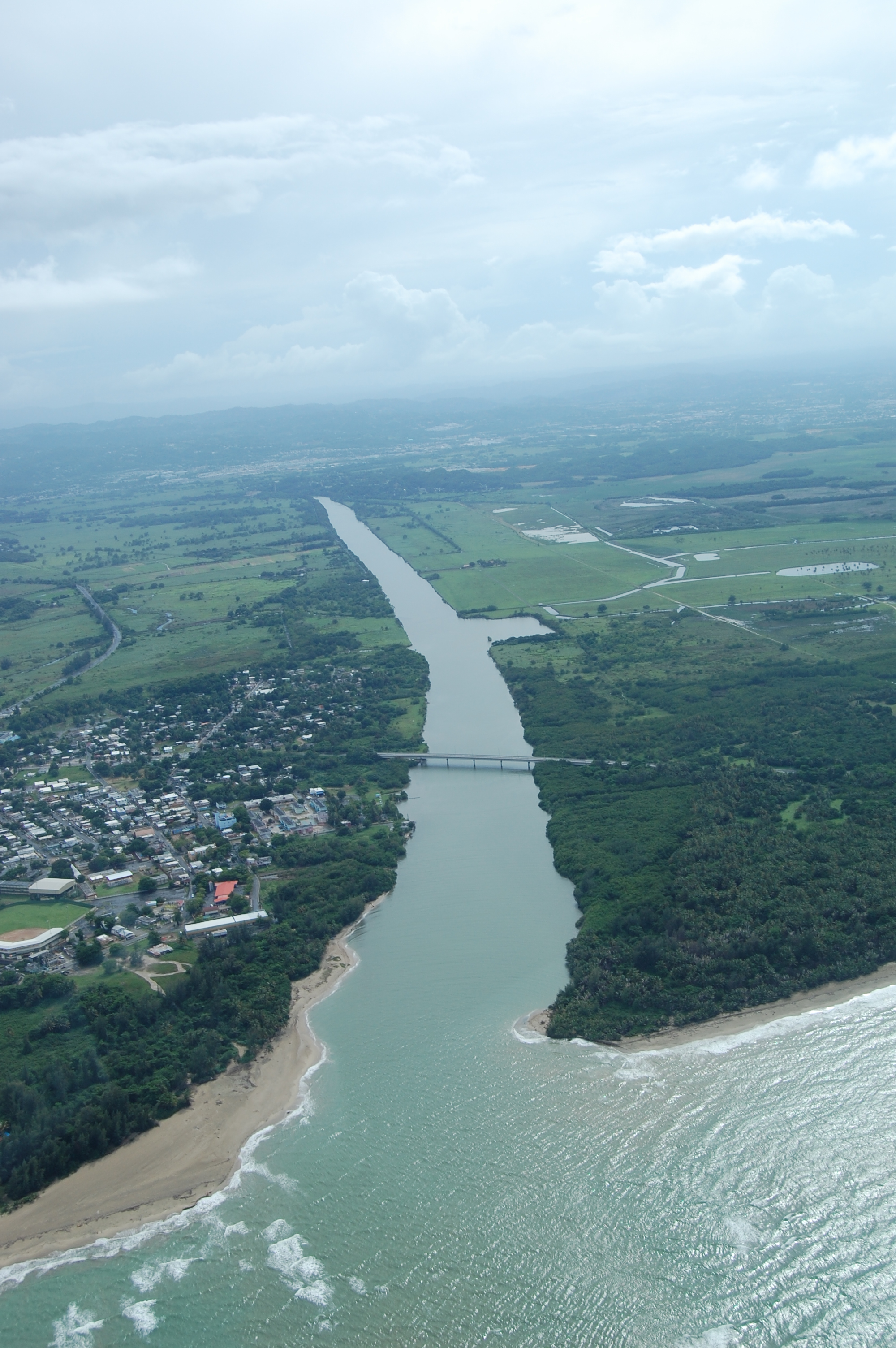
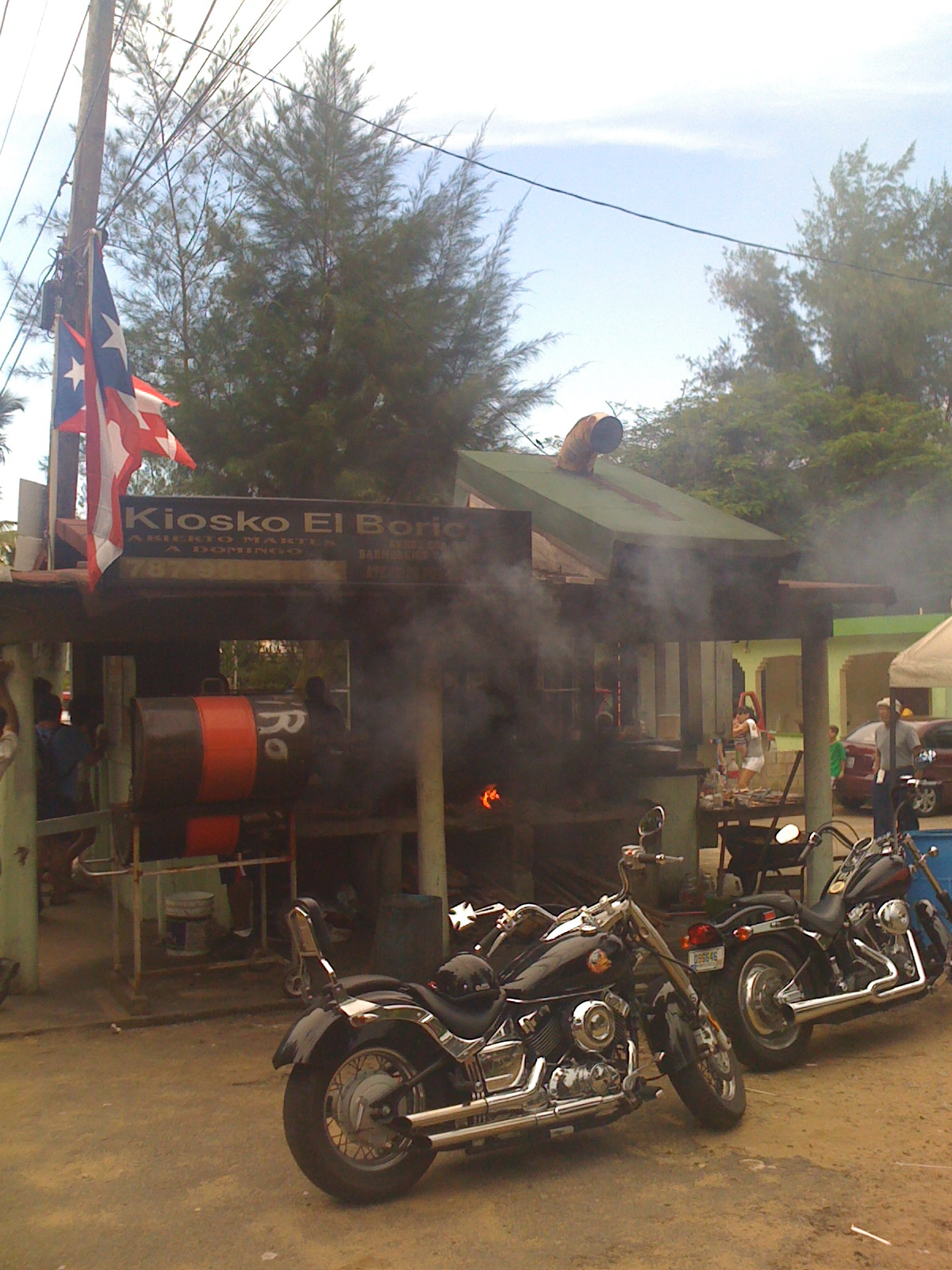
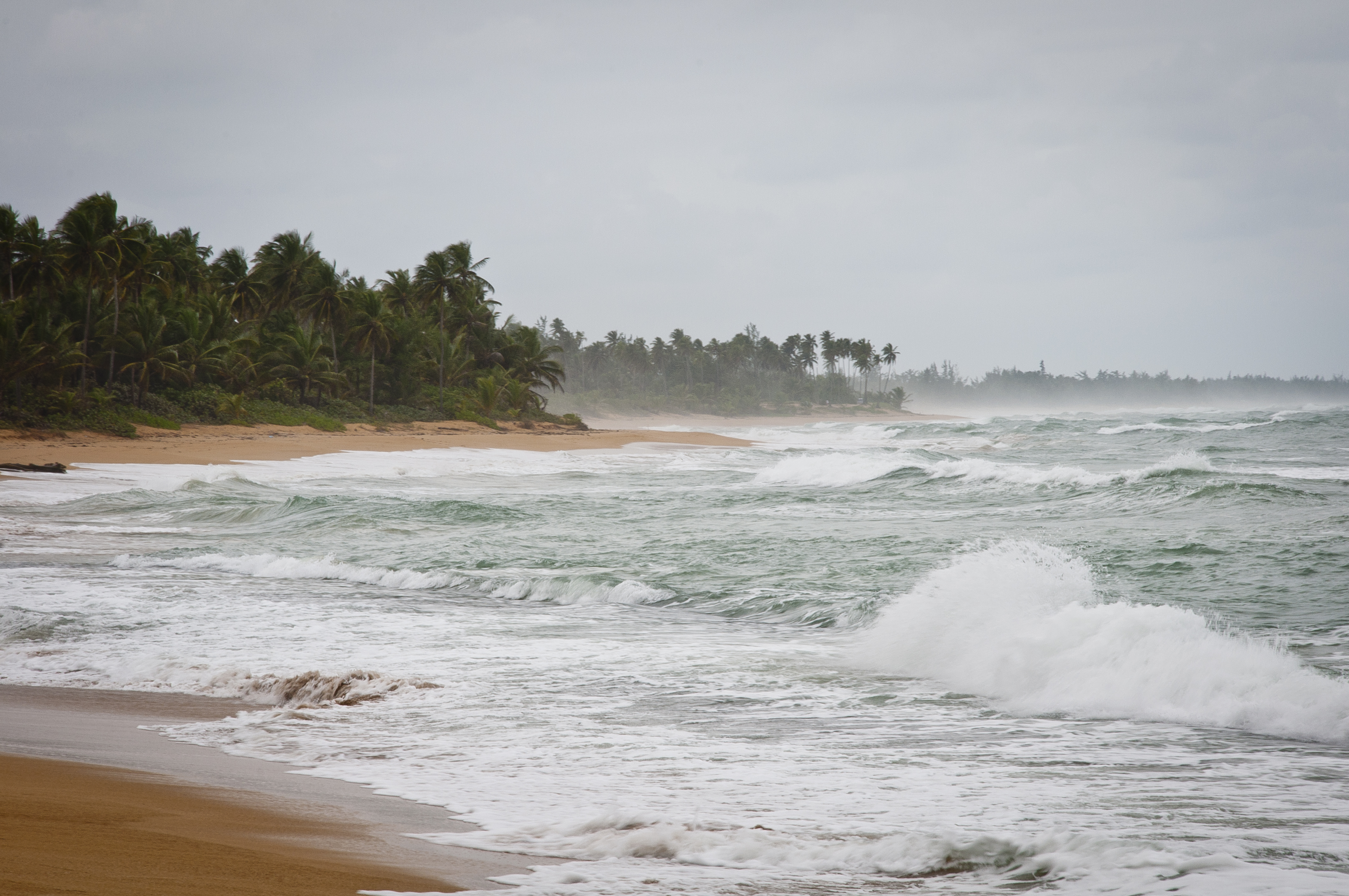
- Loíza City Hall Loíza Parish Loíza High School Loíza River Food kiosk in Piñones Piñones beaches in Torrecilla Baja

- Flag Coat of arms
- Nickname: "El Pueblo de la Cacica"
- Anthem: "Loiceños en Acción"
- Map of Puerto Rico highlighting Loíza Municipality
- Interactive map of Loíza
- Coordinates: 18°25′11″N 65°52′23″W
- Sovereign state: United States
- Commonwealth: Puerto Rico
- Settled: 16th century
- Founded: August 16, 1692
- Named for: Yuisa
- Barrios: 6 barrios: Canóvanas; Loíza barrio-pueblo; Medianía Alta; Medianía Baja; Torrecilla Alta; Torrecilla Baja

Government
  - Mayor: Julia Nazario (PPD)
  - Senatorial dist.: 8 - Carolina
  - Representative dist.: 37

Area
  - Total: 65.71 sq mi (170.19 km^{2})
  - Land: 19.44 sq mi (50.36 km^{2})
  - Water: 46.27 sq mi (119.83 km^{2})

Population (2020)
  - Total: 23,693
  - Estimate (2025): 21,542 ▼
  - Rank: 50th in Puerto Rico
  - Density: 1,219/sq mi (470.5/km^{2})
- Demonym(s): Loiceño (masculine); Loiceña (feminine)
- Time zone: UTC−4 (AST)
- ZIP Code: 00772
- Area code: 787/939

Loíza (pronounced [loˈisa]) is a town and municipality on the northeastern coast of Puerto Rico, located east of Carolina, west of Río Grande, and north of Canóvanas. An outer municipality within the San Juan metropolitan area, it is spread over 5 barrios and the downtown area and administrative center of Loíza Pueblo. Loíza is renowned for its rich Afro-Puerto Rican culture and heritage. The vendors of Puerto Rican street food in kiosks, the unrestricted beaches, and the Australian pine and mangrove state forest in the district of Piñones in the barrio of Torrecilla Baja are popular destinations among domestic and foreign tourists.

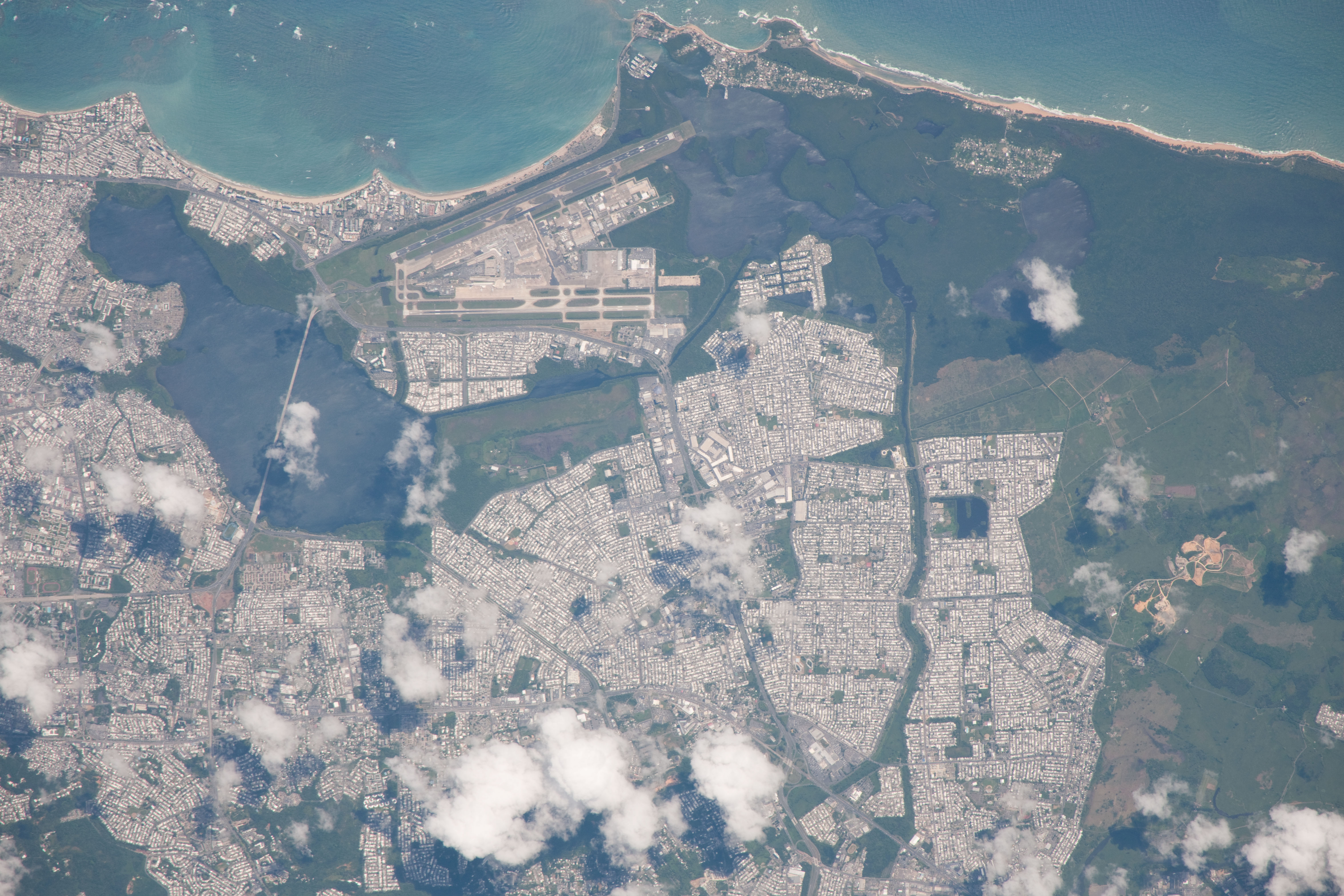
La Torrecilla Lagoon, Piñones Lagoon, Piñones State Forest, and part of Piñones beaches in barrio Torrecilla Baja in western Loíza (right)

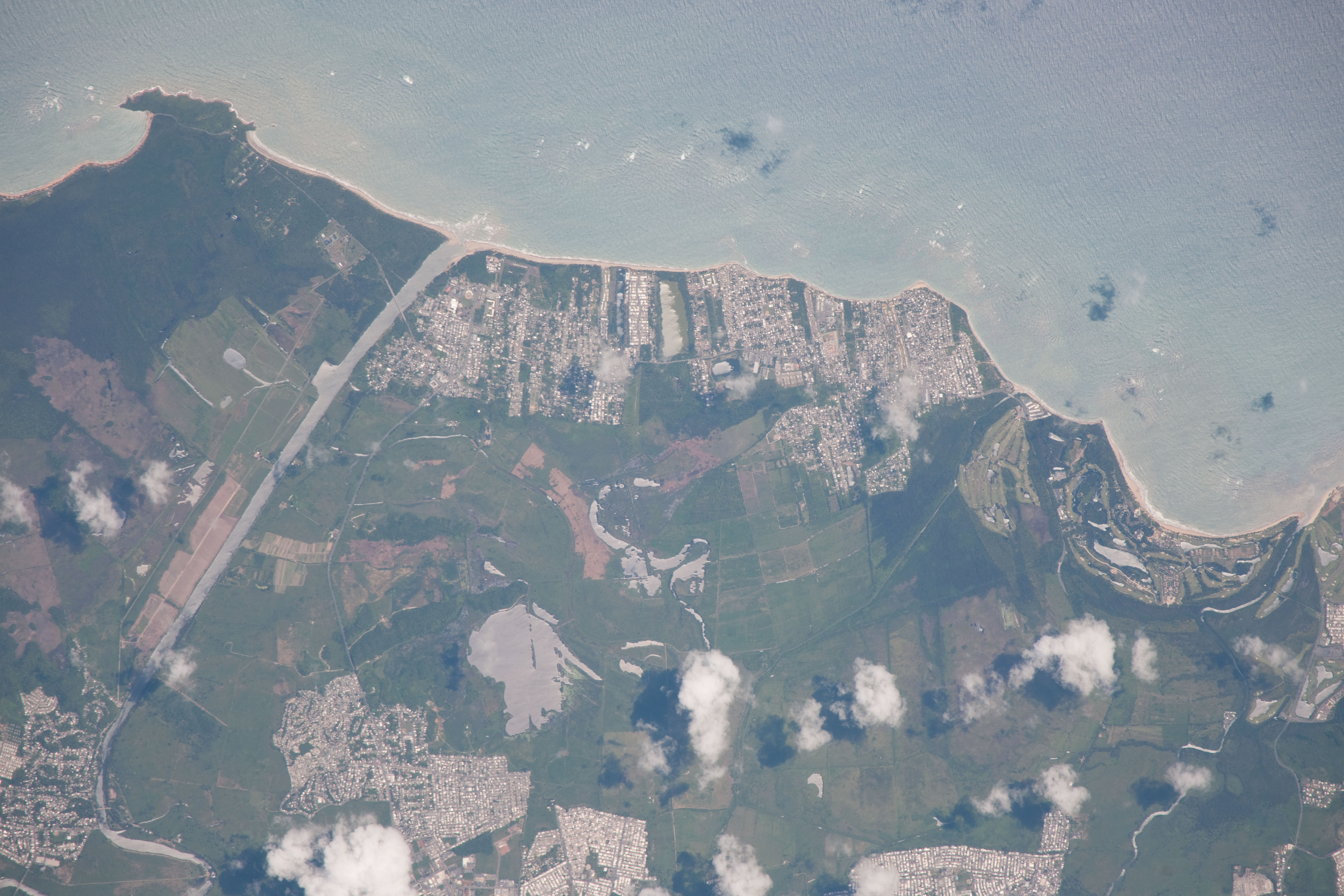
Barrios of Loíza pueblo, Medianía Baja, and Medianía Alta east of the Loíza River in eastern Loíza

== History ==
According to some sources, its name comes from a female cacique, named Loaíza or Yuíza, who governed the region formerly called Haimanio, on the shores of the Río Grande de Loíza. It is said that this cacique might have married a mulatto conquistador called Pedro Mejías, but there is no evidence of this. Other sources point to a Spanish landlord named Iñigo López de Cervantes y Loayza, who owned a lot of the territory, and was renowned among governors and colonists of the time.

In 1692, Loíza was officially declared an urban area due to its population (100 houses and 1,146 residents), but it was in 1719 that the Spanish government declared it as an official town. It was founded by Gaspar de Arredondo.

Puerto Rico was ceded by Spain in the aftermath of the Spanish–American War under the terms of the Treaty of Paris of 1898 and became a territory of the United States. In 1899, the United States Department of War conducted a census of Puerto Rico finding that the population of Loíza was 12,522.

In the 1970s, an Aero Virgin Islands DC-3 plane crashed in a Loíza beach, with no fatalities.

On September 20, 2017 Hurricane Maria struck Puerto Rico. In Loíza, 598 residences lost their roof and 298 homes were a total loss. Loíza suffered a catastrophic hit from Hurricane Maria like the rest of Puerto Rico. In 2018, it was featured in an episode of Bar Rescue called Operation: Puerto Rico where bar consultant Jon Taffer visited Loíza to rescue an area bar and turned it into a community rescue, repairing a local community center, playground, baseball field and basketball court as well as the bar.

=== Gallery ===
Pictures of damage caused by Hurricane Maria in 2017:

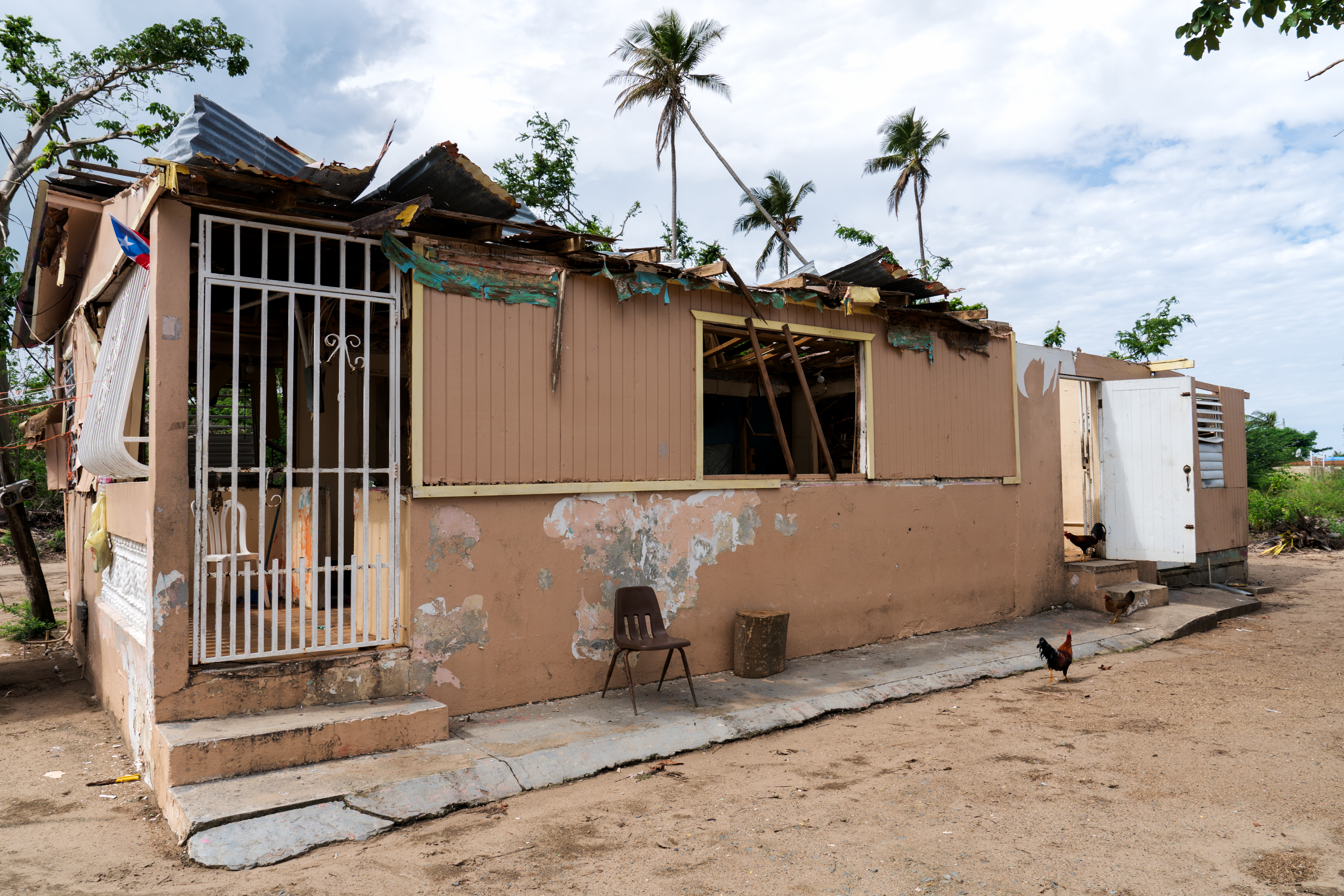
A damaged house exterior in Loíza

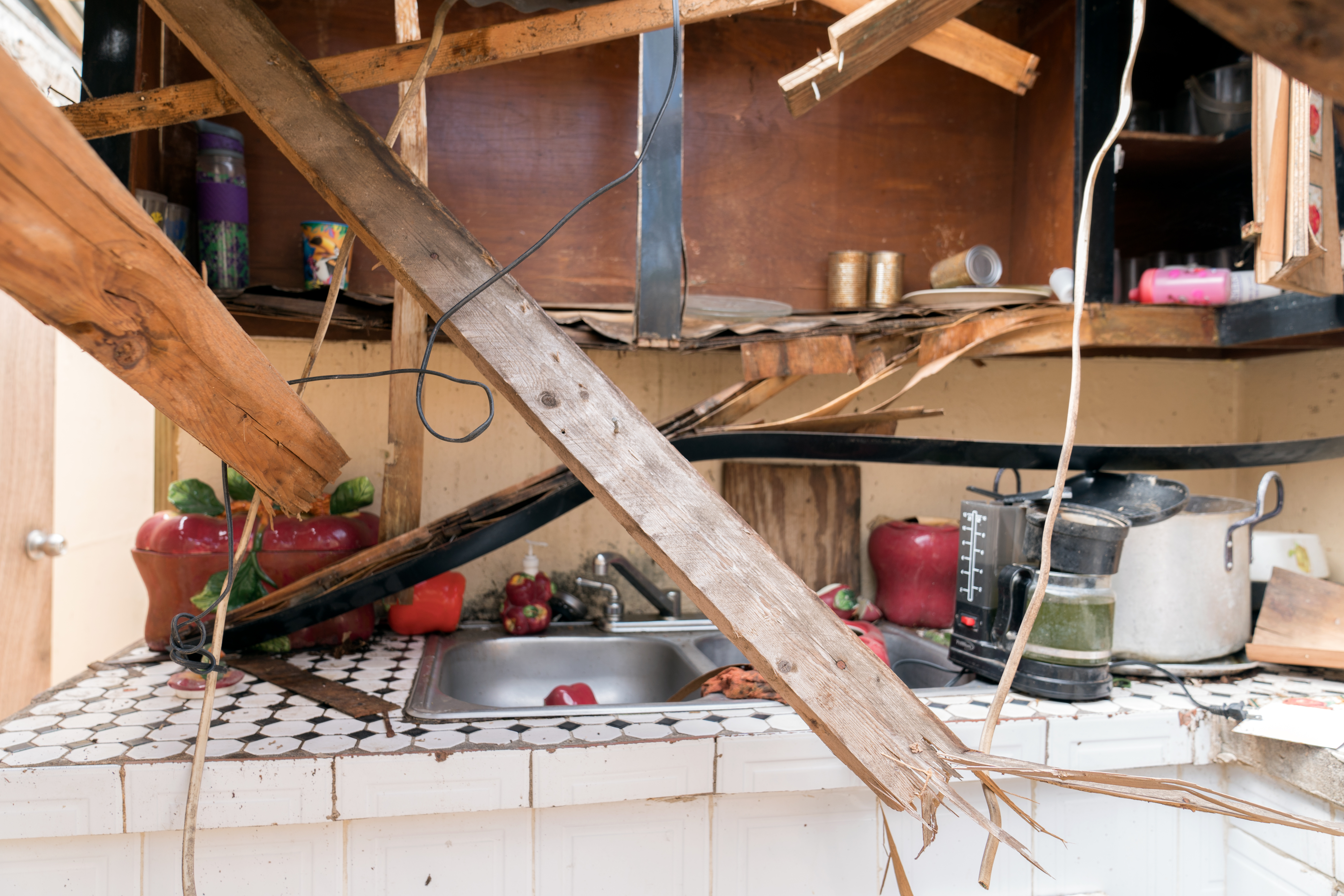
Broken kitchen in Loíza after Hurricane Maria

== Geography ==
Loíza belongs to the geographical region called the Coastal Plains of the North. Its terrain is uniformly plain, since it doesn't exceed 100 meters above water level.

According to the United States Census Bureau, the city has a total area of 65.71 square miles (170.2 km^{2}); of which 19.44 square miles (50.3 km^{2}) of it is land and 46.27 square miles (119.8 km^{2}) of it is water.

=== Barrios ===
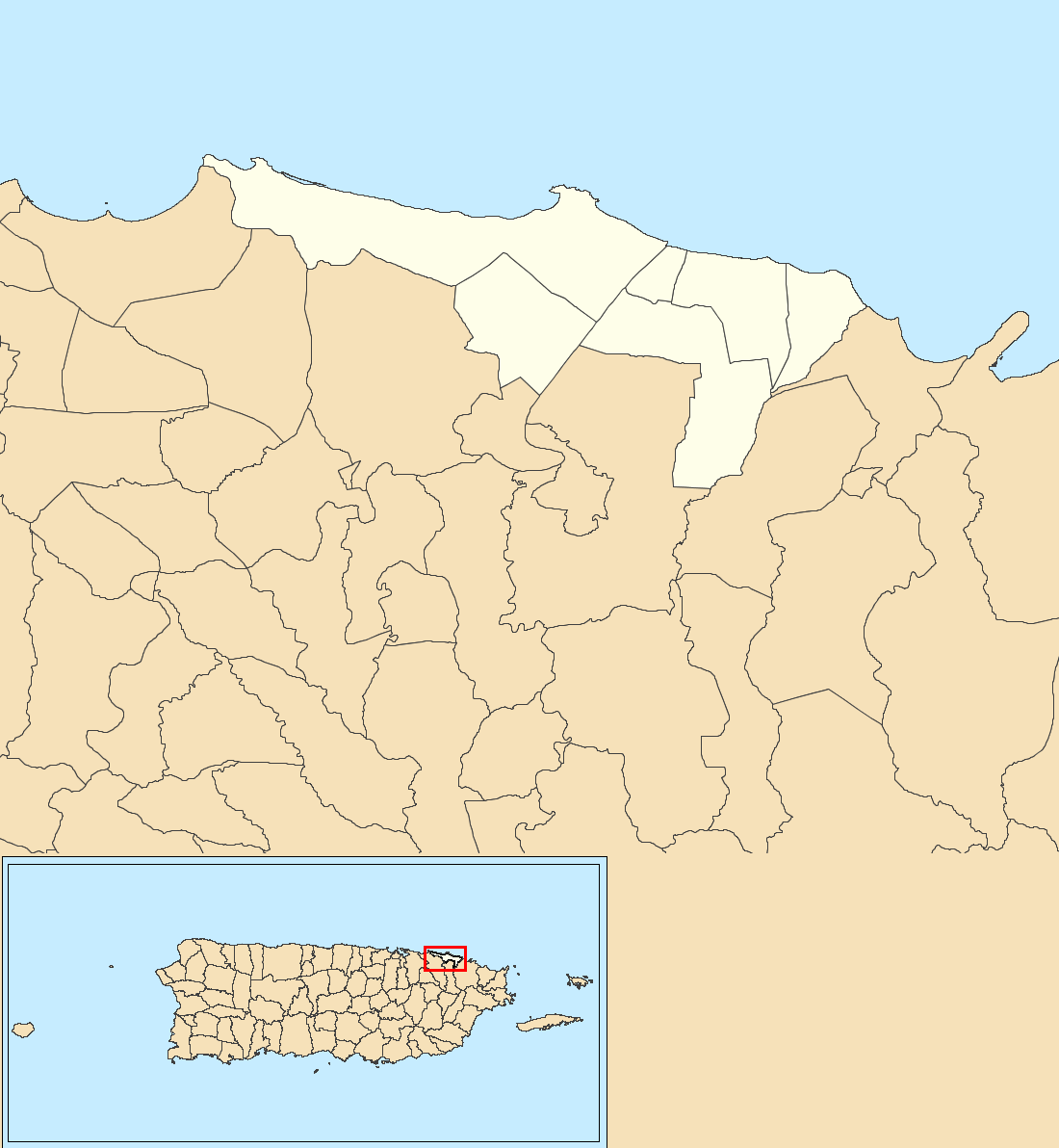
Subdivisions of Loíza.

Like all municipalities of Puerto Rico, Loíza is divided into barrios. The municipal buildings, central square and large Catholic church are located in a barrio referred to as "el pueblo".

1. Canóvanas
2. Loíza barrio-pueblo
3. Medianía Alta
4. Medianía Baja
5. Torrecilla Alta
6. Torrecilla Baja
- Barrio Loíza Aldea had a population of 1606 in 1930, 1454 in 1940, 1745 in 1950 and 2330 in 1960.

=== Sectors ===
Barrios (which are, in contemporary times, roughly comparable to minor civil divisions) are further subdivided into smaller areas called sectores (sectors in English). The types of sectores may vary, from normally sector to urbanización to reparto to barriada to residencial, among others.

=== Special Communities ===
Comunidades Especiales de Puerto Rico (Special Communities of Puerto Rico) are marginalized communities whose citizens are experiencing a certain amount of social exclusion. A map shows these communities occur in nearly every municipality of the commonwealth. Of the 742 places that were on the list in 2014, the following barrios, communities, sectors, or neighborhoods were in Loíza: La 23 in Honduras barrio, Sector Pompeya (Los Pizarros) in Honduras barrio, Sector Villa del Carmen in Honduras barrio, Calle Melilla, Colobó, El Ceiba, El Jobo, Miñi Miñi Piñones, Pueblo del Niño, Tocones, Villa Cañona 1, Villa Cañona 2, Villa Colobó, Villa Kennedy, Villa Santos, and Zapatería Pizarro.

In late May 2020, the mayor of Loíza announced that millions of dollars received from FEMA (Federal Emergency Management Agency) had been earmarked for 10 construction projects in Loíza. Of the ten, the largest project is for scheduled improvements to the Miñi Miñi Sector of Medianía Baja barrio.

== Demographics ==
Historical population
Census	Pop.	Note	%±
1900	12,522		—
1910	13,317		6.3%
1920	15,804		18.7%
1930	18,762		18.7%
1940	22,145		18.0%
1950	24,755		11.8%
1960	28,131		13.6%
1970	39,062		38.9%
1980	20,867		−46.6%
1990	29,307		40.4%
2000	32,537		11.0%
2010	30,060		−7.6%
2020	23,693		−21.2%
2025 (est.)	21,542	▼	−9.1%
U.S. Decennial Census; 1899 (shown as 1900) 1910-1930; 1930-1950 1960-2000 2010 2020

Race - Loíza, Puerto Rico - 2020 Census
Race	Population	% of Total
White	1,376	5.8%
Black/Afro-Puerto Rican	7,533	31.8%
American Indian and Alaska Native	106	0.4%
Asian	21	0.1%
Native Hawaiian/Pacific Islander	0	0.0%
Some other race	3,689	15.6%
Two or more races	10,968	46.3%

The population of the municipality was 23,693 at the 2020 census. Consisting of 8,508 households, and 6,140 families residing in the municipality. The population density was 1,673.4 inhabitants per square mile (646.1/km^{2}). There were 8,508 housing units at an average density of 562 per square mile (217/km^{2}). There were 8,508 households, out of which 45.8% had children under the age of 18 living with them, 49.1% were married couples living together, 29.7% had a female householder with no husband present, and 16.3% were non-families. 14.9% of all households were made up of individuals, and 5.3% had someone living alone who was 65 years of age or older. The average household size was 3.39 and the average family size was 3.77. In the town the population was spread out, with 39.3% under the age of 19, 7.8% from 20 to 24, 27.4% from 25 to 44, 17.3% from 45 to 64, and 8.2% who were 65 years of age or older. The median age was 27 years. The median income for a household in the town was $8,962, and the median income for a family was $9,911. Males had a median income of $14,076 versus $12,903 for females. The per capita income for the town was $4,707. 67% of the population and 64.7% of families were below the poverty line. Out of the total population, 62.3% of those under the age of 18 and 59.5% of those 65 and older were living below the poverty line. The municipality has the highest concentration of Afro-Puerto Ricans on the island. About 4,256 residents speak English as a native language (Census 2000).

== Tourism ==
=== Landmarks and places of interest ===
There are 19 beaches in Loíza.

In May 2020 the Parque Julia de Burgos (Julia de Burgos Park) was inaugurated. Some other attractions of Loíza include:

- Aviones Beach
- Ayala Family Artesan Center
- Julia de Burgos Walk
- María de la Cruz Cavern
- Piñones Lagoon
- San Patricio Parish
- Vacía Talega Beach
- Samuel Lind Estudio de Arte (Samuel Lind Art Studio)

== Culture ==
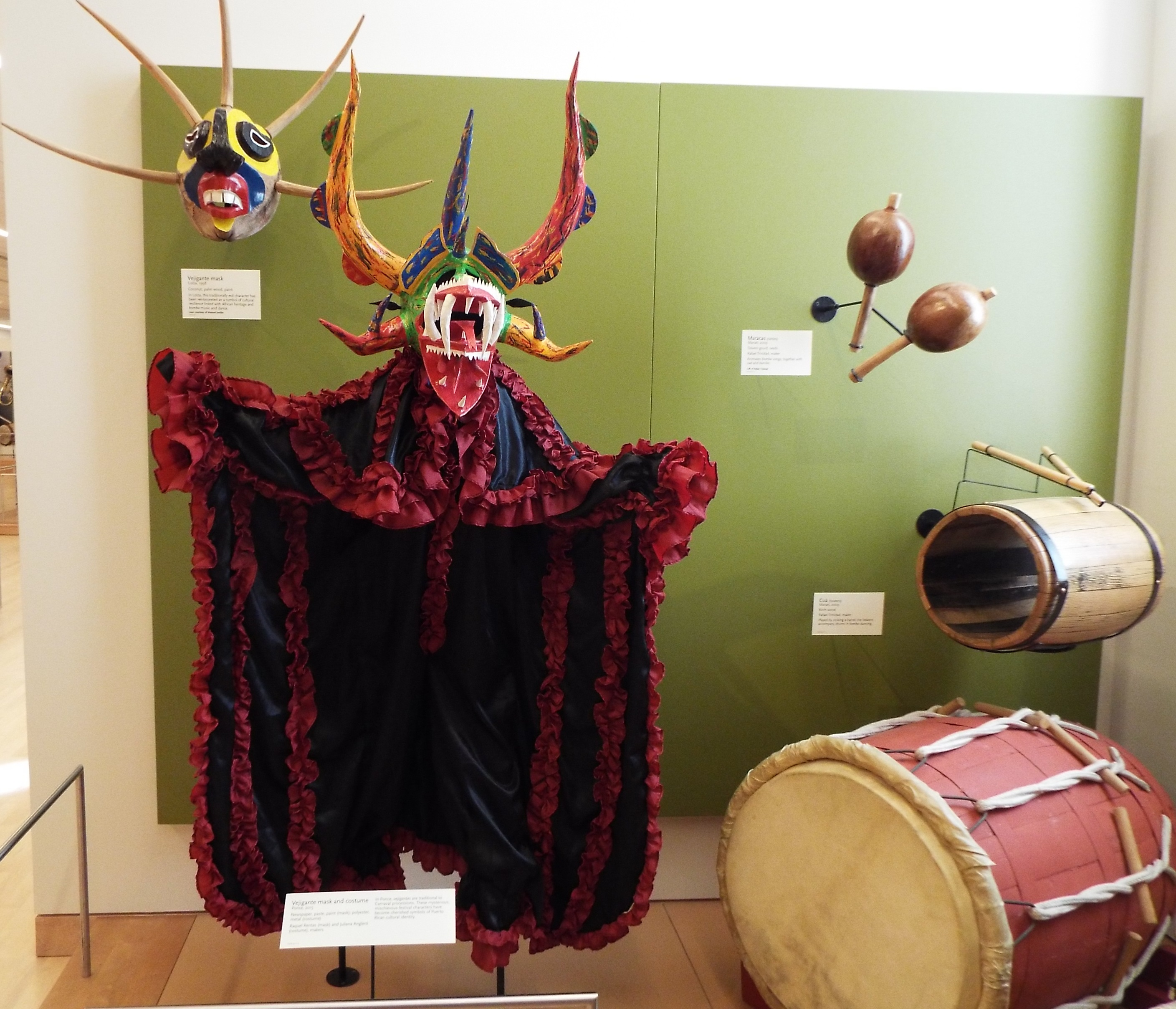
Vejigante Mask and Costume on display at the Musical Instrument Museum of Phoenix

One of Loíza's barrios, Loíza Aldea, is famous across Puerto Rico because it has been a talent pool for dancers and artisans. A center for black Puerto Rican music, it is said to be the traditional birthplace of the musical form known as plena along with Ponce. Each year there is a celebration in Loíza where people parade wearing Máscaras de Vejigante, a type of mask made of coconut and brightly painted.

Loíza is known as "La Capital de la Tradición" (Capital of Traditions) for its bomba music, traditional Taíno and African dishes, folk art, and distinct culture.

=== Festivals and events ===
Loíza celebrates its patron saint festival in March. The Fiestas Patronales de San Patricio is a religious and cultural celebration that generally features parades, games, artisans, amusement rides, regional food, and live entertainment.

Other festivals and events celebrated in Loíza include:

- Mayombe Carnival – February
- Festival of Saint James the Apostle – July

== Economy ==
=== Agriculture ===
Coconuts, fruits, sugar canes, and apples.

=== Industry ===
- Fishing

== Government ==
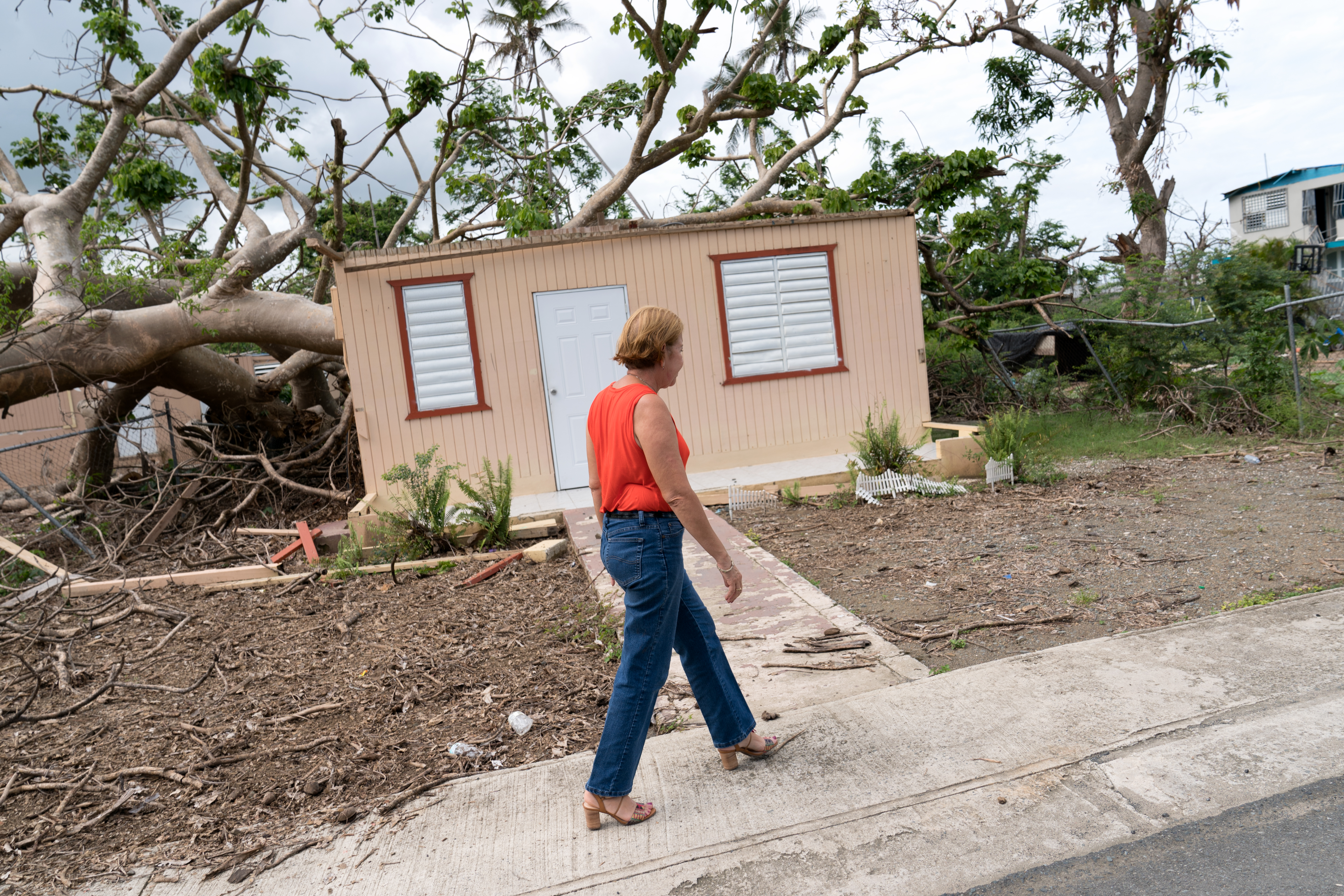
Julia Nazario Fuentes, the mayor of Loiza, is seen walking past a damaged house in Loíza, Puerto Rico after Hurricane Maria in September 2017.

Like all municipalities in Puerto Rico, Loíza is administered by a mayor. The current mayor is Julia María Nazario Fuentes, who was first elected at the 2016 Puerto Rican general elections.

The city belongs to the Puerto Rico Senatorial district VIII, which is represented by two Senators. In 2024, Marissa Jiménez and Héctor Joaquín Sánchez Álvarez were elected as District Senators.

== Symbols ==
The municipio has an official flag and coat of arms.

=== Flag ===
Green and gold and red with three undulating stripes - The silhouette of a bell tower in the upper left hand corner (Canton) of the first stripe represents religious tradition and also serves as a symbol of the Church of San Patricio as an historical monument.

=== Coat of arms ===
The mounted figure of Saint James the Apostle, dominant in the shield, proclaims the devotion to the saint that the Loiceños profess, manifested in a special way during the celebration of traditional festivities every July 25. The flames are emblem of the Holy Spirit, bearer of the seven gifts, a title of the old church of Loíza. The undulating stripe represents the Grande de Loíza River, notable in geography, history and literature of Puerto Rico. The crown symbolizes the famous Taína Chief Yuisa, who lived in Loíza territory where she died. The shamrocks represent Saint Patrick of Ireland and patron of the population.

== Education ==
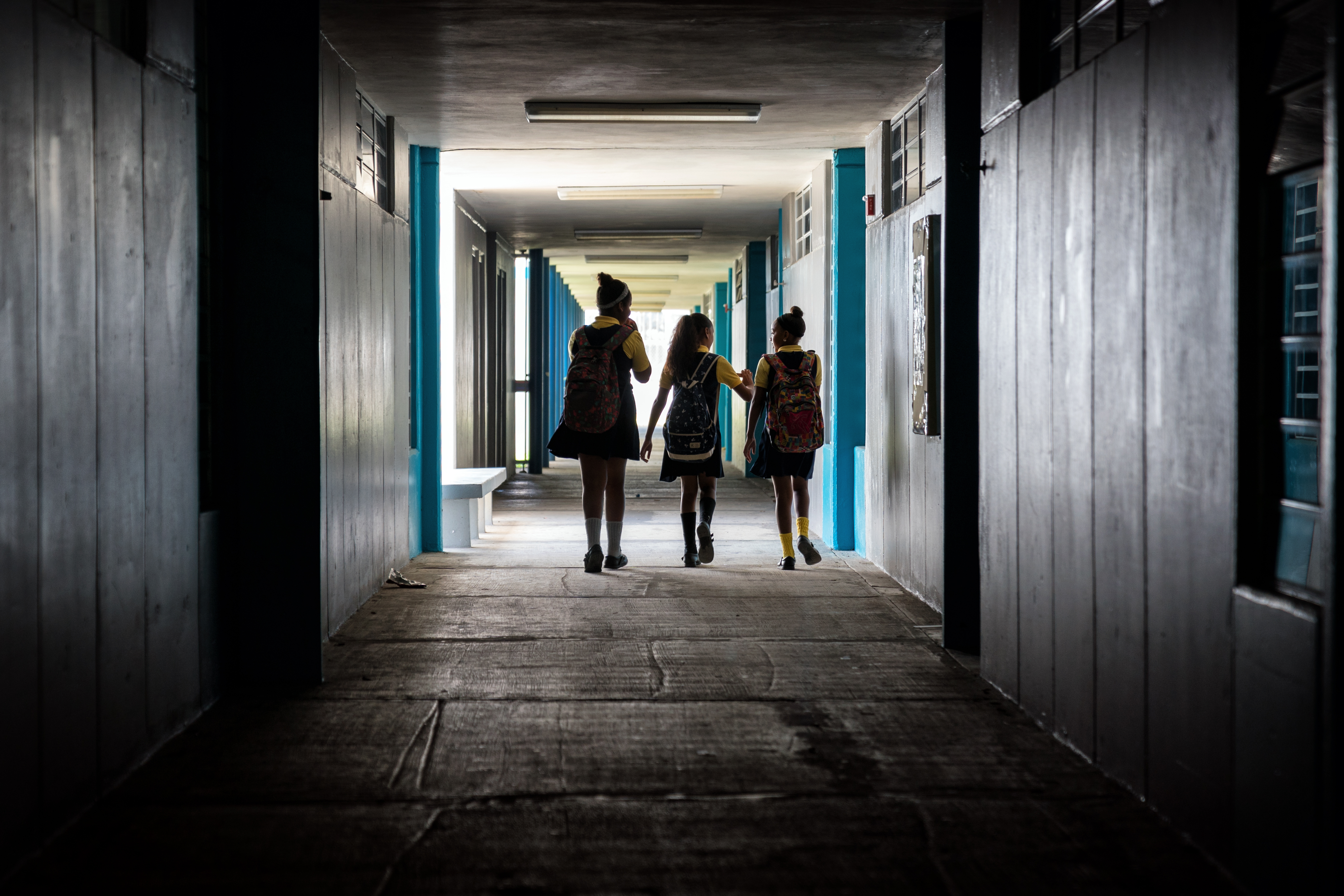
Students at Belen Blanco De Zequeira, a middle school in Loiza

Like all other municipalities, education in Loíza is administered by the Department of Education of Puerto Rico. Loíza has several elementary schools, but only two junior high and two high schools.

== Transportation ==
Service to Loiza is available from San Juan by AMA route D45. This route provides service to Piñones and Isla Verde and connects to the Tren Urbano at Sagrado Corazon station.

There is no public transportation connecting Loiza to the eastern cities of PR, and there are few if any hotels and guest houses in Loiza itself, but there are resorts in Rio Grande.

There are 5 bridges in Loíza.

== Gallery ==
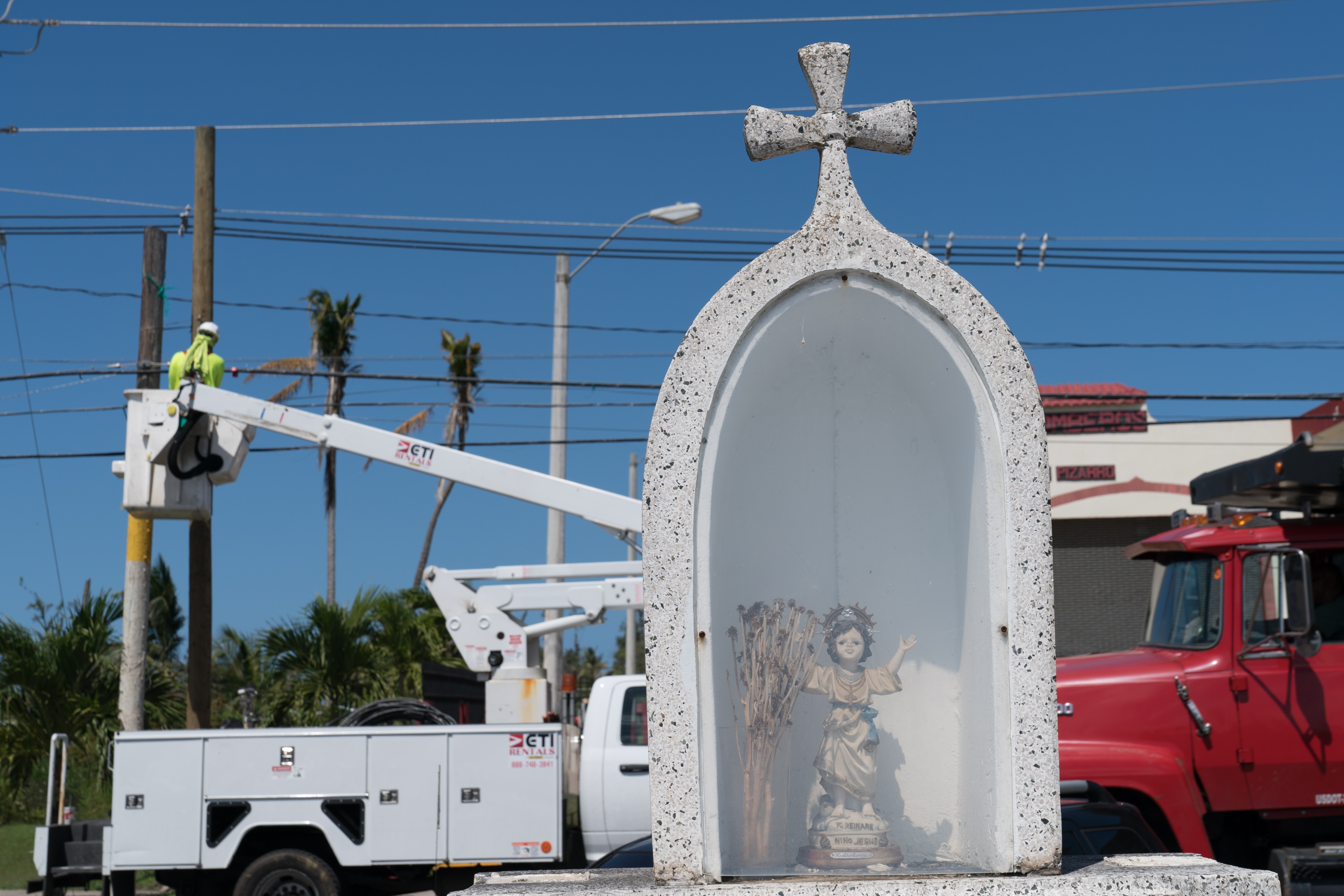
Municipal Cemetery in Loíza

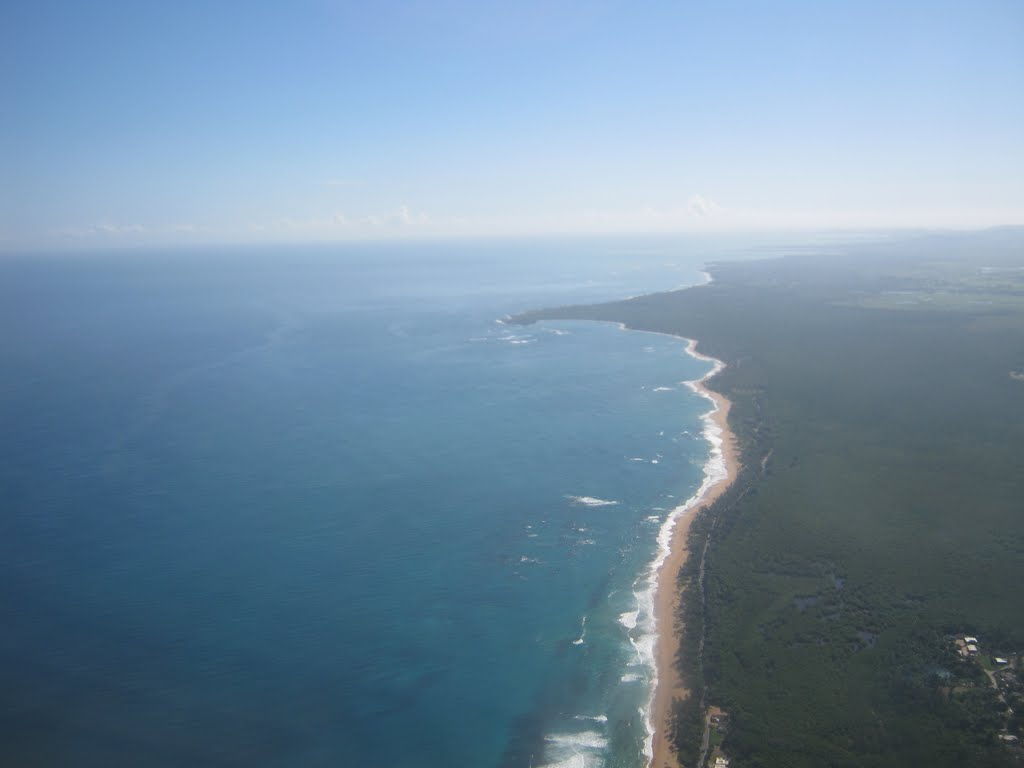
Piñones Beach in Loíza

== See also ==
- List of Puerto Ricans
- History of Puerto Rico
- Did you know-Puerto Rico?
